= List of members of the judiciary of Malta =

List of sitting Maltese judges and magistrates

This is a list of members of the judiciary of Malta, as of October 2026.

== Serving judges of Malta ==
No.	Name	Born	Appointed magistrate	Appointed judge	Expected retirement	Notes
1	Mark Chetcuti	1958	—	2010	2026	Chief Justice since 2020
2	Abigail Lofaro	1961	1996	2006	2026-29	President of Family Section
3	Anthony Ellul	1966	2007	2011	2031-34	—
4	Jacqueline Padovani Grima	1959	1991	2012	2027	First woman to join the Judiciary
5	Lorraine Schembri Orland	1959	—	2012	2027	Judge at ECtHR from 2019
6	Robert Mangion	1961-63	—	2012	2026-28	—
7	Lawrence Mintoff	1959	—	2014	2027	—
8	Miriam Hayman	1962-64	1998	2015	2027-29	President, Civil Court (First Hall)
9	Anthony Vella	1965	2004	2018	2030-33	
10	Consuelo Scerri Herrera	1965	1997	2018	2030-33	—
11	Aaron Bugeja	1968–70	2013	2019	2033–35	—
12	Edwina Grima	1969	2009	2019	2037	—
13	Audrey Demicoli	1968–1969	2006	2021	2036	—
14	Neville Camilleri	1974	2011	2021	2042	Malta's representative on ENCJ
15	Doreen Clarke	1965–68	2007	2022	2030-33	—
16	Josette Demicoli	1967–70	2011	2022	2032-35	—
17	Natasha Galea Sciberras	1976	2012	2023	2041-11	—
18	Ian Spiteri Bailey	1968	—	2023	2033-36	President, Commercial Court; CV
19	Francesco Depasquale	1970	2011	2023	2035-38	—
20	Joanne Vella Cuschieri	1976	2014	2023	2041-44	—
21	Henri Mizzi	1966	—	2023	2031-34	—
22	Mark Simiana	1968-71	—	2023	2033-39	—
23	Christian Falzon Scerri	1982	—	2023	2047-50	CV
24	Rachel Montebello	1975	2018	2025	2040-43	CV;
25	Simone Grech	1980	2018	2025	2045-48	CV;
26	Charmaine Galea	1975–1977	2013	2026 Jan	2040–42	
27	Claire Stafrace Zammit	1972–1973	2009	2026 March	2040–41	
28	Brigitte Sultana	1970–1973	2019	2026 March	2038–41	Chair of the Administrative Review Tribunal, the Land Arbitration Board, Rent Regulation Board
29	Leonard Caruana	1978–82	2021	2026 Sept	2043-50	
30	Elaine Rizzo	1970–74	2021	2026 Sept	2035–42	

== Serving magistrates of Malta ==
#	Name	Born	Appointed magistrate	Expected retirement	Notes
1	Gabriella Vella	1965–68	2009	2030–36	Senior Magistrate
2	Marse‑Ann Farrugia	1971	2010	2036-39	—
3	Monica Vella	1972–76	2015	2037–44	—
4	Joseph Mifsud	1968	2015	2033-36	—
5	Caroline Farrugia Frendo	1970–73	2016	2035–41	—
6	Yana Micallef Stafrace	1962	2017	2027-30	—
7	Astrid May Grima	1974	2018	2039-42	—
8	Victor Axiak	1981	2019	2049	President of the Administrative Review Tribunal (2026)
9	Nadine Lia	1975–80	2019	2040-48	—
10	Donatella Frendo Dimech	1970–73	2019	2035–41	
11	Noel Bartolo	1970–74	2021	2035–42	
12	Lara Lanfranco	1973–77	2021	2038–45	
13	Joseph Gatt	1970–74	2023	2035-42	President of the Administrative Review Tribunal (2026)
14	Giannella Camilleri Busuttil	1975–80	2023	2040-48	—
15	Abigail Critien	1975–80	2023	2040-48	Vice-Chairman, Judicial Studies Committee
16	Kevan Azzopardi	1975–80	2023	2040-48	—
17	Antoine Agius Bonniċi		2024		former Attorney General prosecutor
18	Philip Galea Farrugia	1968–72	2024	2033–40	former Assistant Attorney General (2014)
19	Jean Paul Grech	1975–80	2024	2040-48	
20	Ann Marie Thake	1970–73	2024	2035–41	
21	Nadia-Helena Vella	1972–76	2024	2037–44	
22	Ingrid Bianco	1975–78	2025	2040–46	—
23	Franco Agius	1970–74	2025	2035-42	—
24	Tanya Sammut	1970–74	2025	2035-42	—
25	Monica Borg Galea	1970–74	2025	2035-42	—
26	Franca Giordmaina	1970–75	2026	2035–40	President of the Administrative Review Tribunal, Chair of the Land Arbitration Board and of the Rent Regulation Board
27	Patrick Valentino	1968–73	2026	2033–38	Chair of the Land Arbitration Board
28	Claudio Zammit	1970–75	2026	2035–40	President of the Administrative Review Tribunal, Chair of the Rent Regulation Board
29	Natalino Caruana De Brincat	1972–75	2026	2037–43	Chair of the Administrative Review Tribunal, Rent Regulation Board, Land Arbitration Board, and Rural Leases Control Board.
30	Renata Farrugia	1975–78	2026	2040–46	—

== Retired judges ==
This is an incomplete list.

No.	Name	Born	Appointed magistrate	Appointed judge	Retired	Notes
	Giannino Caruana Demajo	1958	—	1994	Feb 2026	Senior Administrative Judge
	Giovanni Grixti	—	1996	2015	Aug 2026	—
	Grazio Mercieca	1957	2016	2018	2025	Chair of the Disciplinary Board (2026)
	Toni Abela	1957	—	2016	2025	Commissioner for Standards in the Judiciary (2025)
	Joseph R. Micallef	1956				—
	Tonio Mallia	1955				—
	Anna Felice			2006		—
	Joseph Zammit McKeon	1956	—	2009	2021	Ombudsman
	Joseph Azzopardi			2003	2020	Chief Justice 2018-2020
	Silvio Meli	1954	1990	2001	2019	
	Antonio Mizzi	1953	1987	2013	2018	—
	Silvio Camilleri	1953	1987	2013	2018	Chief Justice 2010-2018
	Vincent De Gaetano	1952			2010	Chief Justice 2002-2010
	Giuseppe Mifsud Bonnici	1930		1988	1995	Chief Justice 1990-1995; ECtHR judge 1992-1998
	Lawrence Quintano					PCAC Chair
