= Consuelo Scerri Herrera =

Maltese judge

Consuelo Pilar Scerri Herrera (born 10 October 1965) is a Maltese judge.

== Biography ==
=== Studies and legal practice ===
Consuelo Herrera is the daughter of the late Judge Joseph Alexander Herrera and of Marguerite Galea. She is the sister of José Herrera, a Labour Party politician and environment minister.

Scerri Herrera studied at the Convent of the Sacred Heart, St. Julian's, and at St Aloysius College, Birkirkara, before reading for a diploma as Notary Public (1988) and LL.D. degree in Law (1989) from the University of Malta, with a dissertation on the history of Maltese constitutional law since 1921. She also obtained a diploma in canonic law (marriage cases) by the Church Tribunal of Malta (1999) and a Ph.D. from the University of Malta (2021) on the rights of a suspect prior to interrogation.

In 1988 - 1997, Consuelo and José Herrera set up Herrera and Herrera Advocates, working mostly as defence lawyers in criminal cases.

=== Magistrate ===
In 1997, at age 33, Scerri Herrera was appointed by Prime Minister Alfred Sant as Magistrate in the Courts of Criminal and Civil Jurisdiction of the Courts of Malta.

She has authored several academic publications on human rights law, criminal law, and legal procedure, lectured at Malta's Police academy, and examined theses in law at the University of Malta. She was involved in drafting a Charter, later presented in Parliament, on the "rights and protection of the unborn child".

During her tenure, Scerri Herrera had several legal spats with Daphne Caruana Galizia. In 2010, Caruana Galizia reported that Scerri Herrera "routinely dined out with politicians and journalists, and invited them to her parties – citing specific cases in which she was seen having dinner with Jeffrey Pullicino Orlando when he was appearing before her as a defendant or plaintiff". According to Caruana Galizia, within a day from the report, Chief Justice Vincent Degaetano transferred all libel cases to magistrate Francesco Depasquale. Scerri Herrera sued Caruana Galizia for defamation and harassment.

Following a six-year review of Caruana Galizia's allegations, the Commission for the Administration of Justice of Malta censored Scerri Herrera for breaching the judiciary’s code of ethics "by compromising her integrity and personal dignity, by attending parties and seeking public exposure, and even entertaining the amorous advances of a police inspector", as summed up by Malta Today. The judicial commission found no evidence of personal favoritism towards her partner Robert Musumeci but rebuked her for mingling socially with politicians, policemen and persons involved in court cases she presided in a way that would compromise her perceived impartiality, integrity and personal dignity.

In 2008–2010, Scerri Herrera was investigated for perjury in regard to a lands deal by the Commission for the Administration of Justice of Malta. The Commission did not take action in this case.

In 2017, upon her first nomination by Justice Minister Owen Bonnici for appointment as Judge, Scerri Herrera was vetoed by the Judicial Appointments Committee, who found her unfit for the role due to conduct in her private life, given previous censorship.

=== Judge ===
Justice Minister Owen Bonnici put forward again Scerri Herrera for promotion to Judge in June 2018, after Silvio Camilleri had been replaced by Joseph Azzopardi as Chief Justice. The Minister's decision was deemed by the Times of Malta to be putting the Judicial Appointment Committee "under intense pressure" and sources described it as "unethical" and a way for the government to test the new Chief Justice, sealing his public perception and the credibility of the appointment committee.

In 2018, Scerri Herrera was finally appointed Judge of the Superior Courts of Malta with Criminal Jurisdiction together with the Criminal Court and Voluntary Court. The same year, Scerri Herrera was also elected by her peers to sit on the Commission for the Administration of Justice of Malta, the same body that had previously censored her.

In 2021, Scerri Herrera recused herself from chairing the criminal trial in the HSBC heist case, after the alleged robber Vince Muscat claimed her brother José Herrera had close relations with two high-profile Labour politicians linked to the botched 2010 robbery.

In 2025 Scerri Herrera called for harsher sentences in cases of domestic violence.

In late 2025 Scerri Herrera was deemed a candidate to succeed Mark Chetcuti as Chief Justice of Malta, thanks to her reputation as,

=== Private life ===
Around 1990 Consuelo Herrera married Lawrence Scerri, with whom has three children. The family lived in Kappara.

In the mid-2000s, she had a long affair with police inspector Dominic Micallef. Scerri Herrera divulgated his letters, which were later shown in court during her disciplinary proceedings.

In 2008, Scerri Herrera left her husband for architect-lawyer Robert Musumeci, then PN mayor of Siġġiewi.

In 2013 her daughter Justine Scerri Herrera, at 22, was appointed member of Malta's Adoption Board.

== See also ==
Judiciary of Malta
