= Caruana =

Caruana is a surname and given name, commonly found in Sicily and Malta. Notable people called Caruana include:

== As a surname ==
- Alfonso Caruana (born 1946), member of the Sicilian Mafia
- Angelik Caruana, Maltese resident who reports visions of the Virgin Mary
- Antonio Annetto Caruana (1830–1905), Maltese archaeologist and author
- B. J. Caruana, Australian singer and songwriter
- Charles Caruana (1932–2010), Roman Catholic Bishop of Gibraltar
- Chris Caruana (born 1971), Australian former professional rugby league footballer
- Christian Caruana (born 1986), Maltese international footballer
- Clyde Caruana (born 1985), Maltese politician within the Labour Party
- Danielle Caruana, known professionally as Mama Kin, Australian singer-songwriter
- Deirdre Caruana (born 1972), Maltese former sprinter
- Fabiano Caruana (born 1992), Italian-American chess grandmaster
- Francesco Saverio Caruana (1759–1847), Maltese prelate
- Gabriel Caruana (1929–2018), Maltese artist and ceramicist
- George Caruana (1831–1872), Maltese philosopher
- George J. Caruana (1882–1951), Archbishop, Vatican diplomat
- Jaime Caruana (born 1952), BIS employee
- John Caruana (1866–1923), Maltese lawyer and philosopher
- John Caruana (footballer) (born 1961), Maltese footballer
- Jonathan Caruana (born 1986), footballer
- Joseph Cachia Caruana (1894–1981), Maltese architect
- Justyne Caruana, Maltese lawyer and politician
- Laurence Caruana (born 1962), Maltese artist, writer and lecturer
- Liam Caruana (born 1998), Italian-American former tennis player
- Lydia Caruana, Maltese operatic soprano
- Maurus Caruana (1867–1943), Roman Catholic Bishop of Malta
- Natasha Caruana (born 1983), photographic artist
- Orlando E. Caruana (1844–1917), Medal of Honor recipient
- Patrick P. Caruana (born 1939), United States Air Force lieutenant general
- Peter Caruana (born 1956), Gibraltarian politician and Chief Minister of Gibraltar
- Raymond Caruana, Maltese Nationalist Party activist, murdered in 1986
- Richard Cachia Caruana KOM (born 1955), Maltese politician and office holder
- Sarah Caruana (born 1984), Maltese former footballer
- Tristan Caruana (born 1991), Maltese international footballer
- Vinnie Caruana (born 1979), American singer

== Double surnames ==
- Jerome Caruana Cilia, Maltese politician from the Nationalist Party
- Giannino Caruana Demajo (born 1958), Maltese judge
- Debbie Caruana Dingli (born 1962), Maltese painter
- Edward Caruana Dingli (artist) (1876–1950), Maltese painter
- Edward Caruana Dingli (swimmer) (born 1992), retired Maltese swimmer
- Daphne Caruana Galizia (1964–2017), Maltese investigative journalist
- Alfredo Caruana Gatto (1868–1926), Maltese lawyer, politician and naturalist
- Oana Caruana Pulpan (born 1978), Maltese chess player
- Marcel Caruana Francis (born 1983), Maltese/English, recognised as elite at forgery and counterfeiting

== See also ==
- 30201 Caruana, minor planet, 2.4 km diameter
- Cuntrera-Caruana Mafia clan, part of the Sicilian Mafia or Cosa Nostra
