= Grima =

Grima may refer to:

== People with the surname ==
- Andrew Grima (1921–2007), Anglo-Italian jewellery designer
- Clara Grima (born 1971), Spanish mathematician
- Clifton Grima, Maltese politician
- Edwina Grima, Maltese judge
- Hollie Grima (born 1983), Australian basketball player
- Joe Grima New Zealand-British rugby player
- Joey Grima, Australian rugby coach
- Jacqueline Padovani Grima, Maltese judge

== Other ==
- Grima (Svalbard), a river in Svalbard
- Gríma Wormtongue, a character in J. R. R. Tolkien's The Lord of the Rings
- Grima the Fell Dragon, a character in the video game Fire Emblem Awakening
- Colombian grima, a sport and martial art practiced in Colombia
- Spanish term for emotional disgust from the sound of chalkboard scraping (fingernails on a chalkboard sound)
- Grima, an atmospheric black metal band

== See also ==
- Greema, a fictional alien race in the video game Disney's Stitch: Experiment 626
- Grimas, long sticks used in the Afro-Brazilian dance Maculelê
- Grimer, a Pokémon
- Grimma, a town in the Free State of Saxony, Central Germany
