= Toni Abela =

Maltese politician

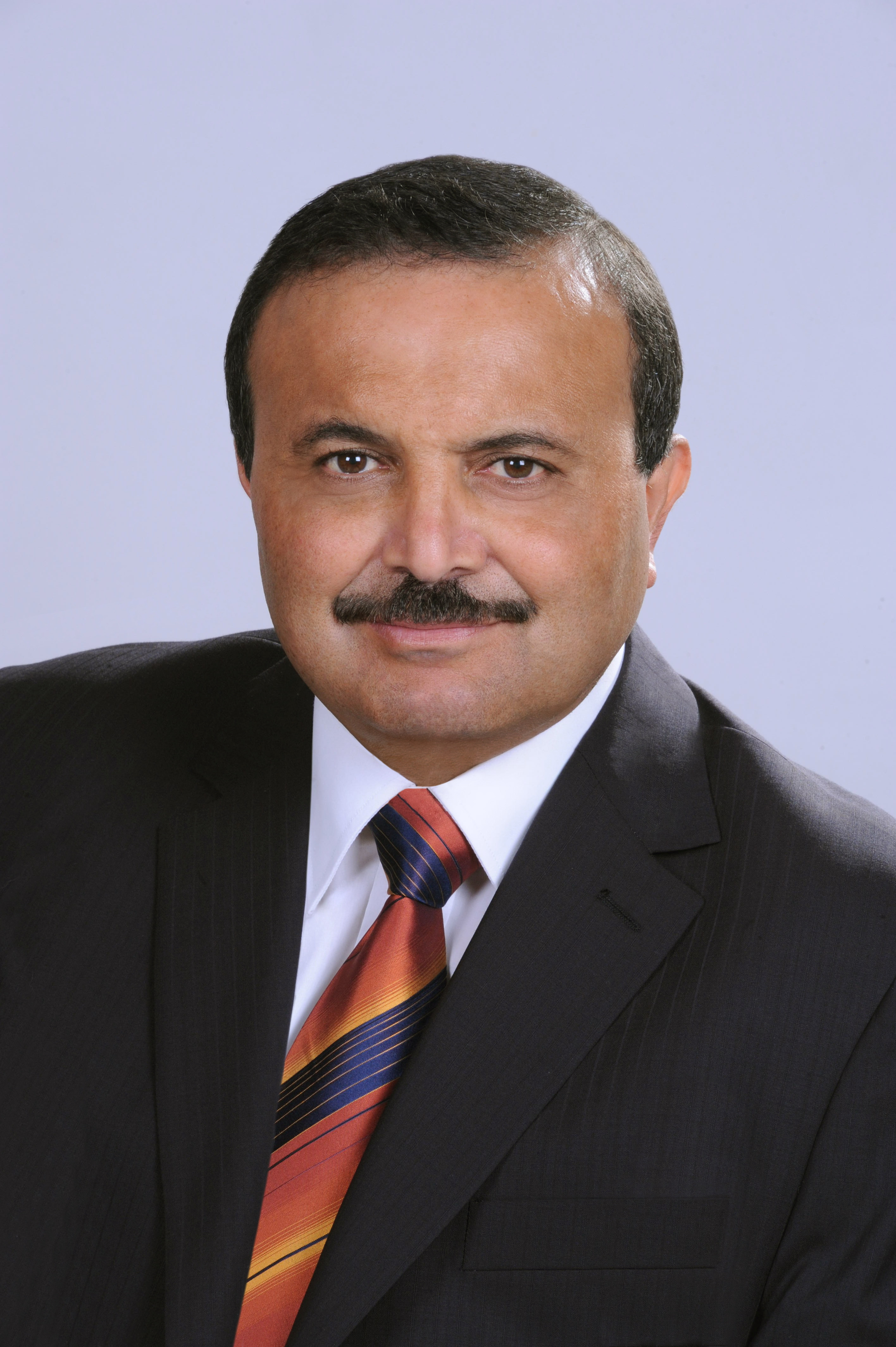
- Toni Abela in 2016

Deputy Leader of the Labour Party Party Affairs
- In office 13 June 2008 – 21 March 2016
- Leader: Joseph Muscat
- Preceded by: Michael Falzon
- Succeeded by: Konrad Mizzi

Judge of the Superior Courts
- In office 2016–2025

Commissioner for Standards of the Judiciary
- In office 10 December 2025 – 2025

Personal details
- Born: 2 July 1957 (age 69)
- Party: Labour Party (1987-1989, 1998-2015); Democratic Alternative (1989-1998)
- Spouse: Marisa
- Children: 3

Toni Abela (born 2 July 1957) is a Maltese lawyer, former politician and retired judge. He was deputy leader of the Labour Party from 2008 to 2016 and served as a judge of the Civil Court from 2016 until June 2025. He was sworn in as Malta's first Commissioner for Standards of the Judiciary in December 2025.

== Early life and studies ==
Abela grew up between Marsa and Ħamrun. He recounted how he grew up in a poor neighbourhood, as "part of the proletariat of the southern part of Malta", with his grandmother being a Labourite seamstress and several PL executives living next door including Karmnu Zammit and Joe Brincat.

Abela attended government schools and the Ħamrun Lyceum, from where he also published the literary newspaper Il-Mixtla with Ġorġ Mallia. He also spent 18 months at the Missionary Society of St Paul in Żebbuġ, Gozo. Then Minister of Justice Ġużè Cassar (a lawyer close to PM Dom Mintoff recommended him to study Law and become a practicing lawyer, although Abela's father was initially against.

While reading law at the University of Malta, Toni Abela also engaged in journalism, writing for L-Orizzont, Illum, Sunday newspaper Il-Kullhadd and (in English) for the Malta Independent. He also got to know during his studies Reno Borg, Marco Farrugia and the future archibishop Charles Scicluna.

Abela stated that in 1982 he volunteers for several months in a leprosy hospital in Calcutta, (India) and that in Autumn 1983 he joined the diplomatic mission of Malta at the United Nations in New York as legal adviser during the 38th session of the UN General Assembly. Abela obtained a Diploma of Notary Public in 1983 and graduated in Law in 1984 with a thesis on "The Marxist Interpretation of the Law".

== Personal life ==
Abela is married to Marisa Abela, and they have three children: Estelle, Fleur and Aaron.

Toni Abela always sported a moustache. In 2015 recounted how he had initially been advised to shave it off, as it could have affected his popularity as a politician, but refused. "I doubt if I was born without it, because I always remember myself having it. It is a characteristic that defines me. It's become my identity and I won't shave it".

== Laywer's practice ==
Upon graduation, Toni Abela decided to start its own practice rather than join a law firm. He practiced at first from the lawyer's office of Karmenu Mifsud Bonnici in Ħamrun, and also opened another in Valletta. He described how he practiced as "a village lawyer", although he already wished to specialised on human rights protection. In those same years, Abela rose in the ranks of the Labour Party.

Abela kept practising as a lawyer throughout his political career, until appointment to the judiciary in 2016. He practised in family law, Constitutional issues, administrative law, procurement regulations and civil and commercial suits. In 1999, Abela represented minority shareholders in Mid-Med Bank during the dispute surrounding its acquisition by HSBC, including the suspension of trading in the bank's shares between April and June 1999. Abela also described having successfully challenged restrictions on political parties' access to airtime on State broadcasting (in the first actio popularis constitutional case) and the requirement for a bank guarantee for chauffeur-driven car service licences. Abela also stated that other constitutional cases he litigated had led to legislative changes on rent regulations, matrimonial regimes, civil rights and the electoral system. He also described having supported immigrants seeking asylum or a resident visa, both before the ordinary Courts and the Citizenship Review Board, and handled cases concerning companies jointly owned and/or managed by Maltese citizens and third country citizens.

Toni Abela maintained until 2016 the role of editor of the Labour Party-owned Sunday newspaper Il-Kullhadd, in which capacity he was cited as defendant in a number of civil proceedings for libel.

== Political career ==
Member of the executive of the Labour Party (1981-1989)

Abela joined the Labour Party's executive in 1981, when still a law student. Throughout the 1980s, he stated that he campaigned in favour of wider civil rights, amongst others, the right to divorce, political self-criticism and political transparency.

Presidency of the Labour Party (1988-1989), split and foundation of Alternattiva Demokratika

Toni Abela first stood for the 1987 Maltese general election, and in 1988 was elected President of the Labour Party. He left the PL in 1989 after taking a stand against corruption, political violence and criminal elements within the party, identified in Lorry Sant's faction. He later described how "after having made an appeal for Party reform which appeal fell on deaf ears... due to a number of undesirable developments within the Party, I felt that my integrity and political principles would have been compromised if I would have stayed."

That same year, Abela co-founded Alternattiva Demokratika, Malta's Green Party, together with the then Labour Party whip Wenzu Mintoff, espousing environmental issues, equality of gender, political transparency and a fairer electoral system with the introduction of a national quota to allow small political parties to be represented in Parliament on the line of the German model. Abela stated that in those years he campaigned in favour of the introduction of the Whistleblower Act, Freedom of Information Act, the abolishment of prescription in case of abuse of power and corruption by public officials and the need of a Party Financing Law.

Deputy Mayor of Ħamrun (1993)

In 1993, when Malta's Local Councils were first set up, Abela was elected as Deputy Mayor of Ħamrun. Abela stated that he was responsible for law enforcement and management of the citizens' complaints bureau, and also introduced the first bye-laws and established the first local Court.

In 1996-1998, Abela was appointed as a member of the Employment Commission, one of the administrative tribunals of Malta tasked with deciding on alleged political discrimination on the workplace.

Return to the Labour Party (1998) and election as Deputy Leader (Party Affairs) (2008 - 2016)

Abela returned to the Labour Party in 1998, when he felt the party had reformed.

Toni Abela was elected Deputy Leader for Party Affairs on 12 June 2008, a non-remunerated post. He was responsible for managing the Labour Party's internal organisation and administration, including selecting electoral candidates and overseeing political sections and national events. He introduced a statutory prohibition for the Deputy Leader for Party Affairs to contest local and European elections. He claimed that during his tenure the Labour Party went through radical changes at all levels of organisation. Abela also monitored 65 political Labour Party outlets, and set standards of good governance to 39 Labour-led Local Councils and saw that these standards are upheld.

With the return of the Labour Party to power after the 2013 Maltese general election, Abela served as consultant to Prime Minister Joseph Muscat on political, social and legal matters. Abela also provided legal assistance to the Ministry of Family and Social Affairs, including in view of drafting a law to protect vulnerable persons from abuse. According to his 2016 curriculum vitae submitted to the European Parliament, Abela was also involved in drafting Malta's Protection of the Whistleblower Act, legislation regulating the financing of political parties, and legislation to abolish prescription for abuse of power and corruption by public officials.

Allegations of drug cover-up (2013)

During the 2013 General Election campaign a recording emerged of Abela's admitting knowledge to a large quantity of cocaine (blokka l-bajda) being kept at a Labour Party club. The recording infers that, rather than reporting the matter to the police, Abela personally dealt with it internally. However, the Police Commissioner found no wrongdoing by Abela. Abela once claimed that the incident had led to his father's death. Upon retirement, Abela confirmed that he was questioned about the event by judicial appointment commission, to whom he explained the matter.

Nomination to the European Court of Auditors (2016)

The Joseph Muscat cabinet had nominated Abela to serve as a member of the European Court of Auditors, to replace Louis Galea. His nomination was rejected by the European Parliament's budgetary committee, where MEPs questioned his lack of experience in auditing and recalled the blokka l-bajda affair. Rather than forcing a vote on his name in the EP Plenary or the EU Council, which Abela did not wish, the Maltese government withdrew his nomination. To make way for Konrad Mizzi, Toni Abela then resigned from deputy party leader in March 2016. Abela was subsequently appointed to the judiciary.

== Judicial career ==
=== Civil Court Judge ===
Abela was nominated by the Government of Malta to serve as a member of the European Court of Auditors but this nomination was rejected.

From 2016 until retirement he served as a judge presiding over the First Hall of the Civil Court of Malta.

His transition from active politics to the judiciary bench has been subject of debate. Upon retirement, Abela maintained that "a politician is not necessarily unable to do a good job as a judge", that every judge has biases, whether evident or not, and that he was not neutral but was impartial. He believes that Maltese judges are able to rise above their own biases to deliver impartial justice. He also complained that judges' salaries did not match their resposnsibilities and the restrictions required by the job.

In his final court address before retiring from the judiciary in June 2025, Abela insisted that the rule of law should not be "interpreted à la carte" and should be applied "in a consistent manner". He also called to end the distinction between judges of the superior courts, and magistrates of the inferior courts, noting that their job carries the same dignity (a view also shared by Chief Justice Mark Chetcuti), and deplored personal attacks on members of the judiciary. Chamber of Advocates' president Peter Fenech also recognised Abela's moral courage.

During his nine years on the bench, Abela decided 1,424 cases out of 1,737 assigned to him (of which 200 inheriterd). He left some 300 cases undecided.

=== Commissioner for Standards of the Judiciary ===
On 12 December 2025, Toni Abela was sworn in as Malta’s first Commissioner for Standards of the Judiciary, in charge of investigating ethical breaches and public complaints against judges and magistrates and submit findings to the Chief Justice and Justice Minister (not to re-evaluate court sentences). Abela was appointed by the Commission for the Administration of Justice of Malta, following legislative amendments aimed to enhance public trust in the judiciary.

His first prominent case concerned the allegations put forward by judge Lawrence Mintoff about prime minister Robert Abela during the process of appointing a Chief Justice to replace Mark Chetcuti. Abela and Mintoff had been close in their previous political career as Labour Party MPs.

In October 2026, lawyer Robert Aquilina alleged that Toni's brother Joseph Abela, a former police officer, was behind the dehumanising smear campaign against him with AI-powered images.

== See also ==
Judiciary of Malta
