= Judicial accountability in Malta =

Judicial accountability in Malta is based on Article 101B of the Constitution, introduced in 2016.

== Disciplinary proceedings ==
To ensure accountability while guaranteeing judicial independence, members of the judiciary of Malta may be subject to disciplinary measures (warning, fines, suspensions) from their own peers if they breach the Code of Ethics. Disciplinary accountability is distinct from criminal liability, although serious misconduct may give rise to both.

Based on Article 101B of the Constitution (introduced in 2016), written complaints may be submitted by the chief justice of Malta, or by the minister responsible for justice. Complaints are examined by a Committee for Judges and Magistrates. This committee is composed of three members of the judiciary who are not members of the Commission for the Administration of Justice and who shall be elected from amongst judges and magistrates so however that in disciplinary proceedings against a magistrate two of the three members shall be magistrates and in the case of disciplinary proceedings against a judge two of the three members shall be judges.

If the Committee determines that there is a prima facie case, disciplinary proceedings are opened. These take place generally in camera (in private). The concerned member of judiciary has the right to be informed of the allegations, to be heard, to be represented by legal counsel, and to present evidence and submissions. If misconduct is proven, sanctions may include a reprimand, a financial penalty, or suspension from office (with loss of salary). Decisions of the Committee may be appealed before the Constitutional Court. Disciplinary decisions are not routinely disclosed, and public knowledge arises through media reporting rather than public records.

In cases of serious misconduct or incapacity, the Commission for the Administration of Justice may recommend removal from office, which requires a resolution of the House of Representatives supported by a two-thirds majority.

=== Specific cases ===
In 2025, upon findings of the Committee for Judges and Magistrates, the Commission for the Administration of Justice decided to suspend on half pay Magistrate Monica Vella after having found "administrative breaches" such as significant delays in issuing written decisions, a heavy backlog and other administrative shortcomings — including failing to timely transmit case files, contributing to procedural delays. Vella appealed the disciplinary decision while continuing to serve pending the appeal.

== Commissioner for Standards of the Judiciary (2025) ==
In 2025, the Parliament of Malta, by simple majority, introduced in the Constitution the office of Commissioner for Standards of the Judiciary, intended to provide a structured disciplinary oversight mechanism and allow members of the public to submit complaints about judicial misconduct, with the aim of strengthening ethical standards and accountability in the judiciary.

The first commissioner, retired judge Toni Abela, was sworn in December 2025.

== Pre-2016 framework ==
Prior to the 2016 constitutional reforms, judicial discipline was limited to impeachment, which required a two-thirds majority vote by the House of Representatives for "proved misbehaviour" or incapacity to perform judicial functions.

The legislation did not provide for lesser sanctions such as warnings, fines, or suspensions. Reform discussions noted that the absence of a formal disciplinary body left a gap in judicial accountability.

Several instances of impeachment proceedings were initiated, but none resulted in the removal of a judicial officer. Outcomes included resignation, retirement, death, or failure to achieve a two-thirds majority in Parliament.

Notable cases included:

- Noel Arrigo and Patrick Vella (2002): following a corruption scandal involving bribery, impeachment motions were initiated. Both judges resigned before impeachment could be concluded, and no formal parliamentary vote took place.
- Lino Farrugia Sacco (2014): the judge retired before a parliamentary vote on impeachment proceedings, thereby retaining pension rights.
- Ray Pace: impeachment proceedings were terminated following his death.
- Anton Depasquale and Magistrate Carol Peralta: both had impeachment motions filed in Parliament, but these did not achieve the required two-thirds majority for their removal.
