= Harry Vassallo =

Dr Harry Vassallo

Chairperson of Alternattiva Demokratika
- In office 1998–2008

Personal details
- Political party: AD
- Spouse: Susanna
- Children: Sebastian, Nina, Anna lucia
- Profession: Lawyer and Journalist

Harry Vassallo (born Enrico Vassallo) was the Chairperson of the Maltese Green political party, Democratic Alternative from 1998 till 2008. He was succeeded by Prof. Arnold Cassola.

Vassallo studied at the University of Malta from where he graduated as doctor of laws in 1982 with a thesis on Insurance Law.

== Journalism ==
Between 1981 and 1988 Vassallo was law reporter for The Times (Malta) covering a period of trials dealing with human rights violations. He was later parliamentary reporter for the same paper (1988–89) before taking up the editorship of the Green Party paper "Alternattiva" (1989–91). He was a regular contributor to The Times, L-Orizzont and Malta Today before serving as editor of Illum between 2008 and 2010.

== Activism and politics ==
Vassallo first joined the Green movement, a now defunct group, in 1979.

In 1981 he became a member of Żgħażagħ għall-Ambjent, one of the first Maltese environmentalist movements, which was later to rename itself to Moviment għall-Ambjent and, eventually, Friends of the Earth (Malta). Vassallo edited the movement's magazine "L-Ambjent" (1987) and served as its General Secretary (1989).

Vassallo compiled and co-edited The Hielsa Human Rights Report 1984 which contributed in drawing the attention of the Helsinki Watch to human rights violations in Malta and to electoral system reforms prior to the 1987 General Election.

Vassallo was one of the co-founders of Democratic Alternative (DA) in 1989 and unsuccessfully stood for all general elections since on the Party ticket. Vassallo also stood on a Green Party ticket, this time successfully, in 1994 in the local election in Sliema. He has served as Chairperson of DA] between 1998 and 2008.

On the international scene Vassallo was Malta's delegate first to the European Federation of Green Parties and then to its successor the European Green Party (EGP) (1999–2006). He also served as a member of the EGP Committee between 2006 and 2008.

== European Commission ==
In 2010 Vassallo joined the Cabinet of European Commissioner John Dalli where he was responsible for animal health and welfare.

The appointment came as a surprise considering that Dalli and Vassallo both held very senior positions in rival Maltese parties belonging to different political families. Dalli was not spared criticism when, early in his mandate, the European Commission gave the green light for the cultivation of the genetically modified potato Amflora. but oversaw the implementation of the Laying Hens Directive and of the Pigs Directive which ensure the humane housing of these food animals. Following Dalli's resignation, served under EU Commissioner Tonio Borg who implemented the full ban on the testing of animals in the cosmetics industry.

== Malta Permanent Representation to the European Union ==
In 2015 Vassallo was appointed head of the Legal Unit of Malta's PREU in the build-up to Malta's Presidency of the Council of the European Union and served throughout the Presidency with its many challenges not least the start of the BREXIT process.

Political offices
Preceded by Wenzu Mintoff	Chairperson of Alternattiva Demokratika; 1998 - 2008	Succeeded by Arnold Cassola
