= Jacqueline Padovani Grima =

Maltese judge

Jacqueline Padovani Grima (born 6 November 1959 in Malta) is a Maltese judge

== Biography ==
Jacqueline Grima graduated in laws from the University of Malta in 1984 with a dissertation on child custody laws and was admitted to the bar. In 1999, she also obtained a Master's degree from the International Maritime Institute.

In 1986, she worked in Philadelphia with the Dechard, Price and Rhoads law firm. In 1987, she was appointed as a judicial assistant at the Courts of Malta on family law cases. Two years later, she started lecturing on family law at the University of Malta.

In 1989, Padovani Grima was appointed to the Commission for the Advancement of Women. In 1990, she also joined the Commission on the Rights of the Child.

In 1991, Padovani Grima was appointed as a Magistrate by Prime Minister Eddie Fenech Adami - the first woman to join the Judiciary of Malta.

Since 2008, Padovani Grima is a member of the Commission for the Administration of Justice of Malta.

In 2012, Padovani Grima was appointed Judge by Prime Minister Lawrence Gonzi. Among others, she dealt with cases of child abuse.

In 2018, Padovani Grima was assigned to the family court, together with Anthony Vella, replacing Robert Mangion.

She married Dr Ivan Padovani in November 1991; they have a daughter.
