= Aaron Bugeja =

Maltese judge

Aaron Bugeja is a Maltese judge.

== Biography ==
=== Studies and private practice ===
Aaron Bugeja graduated as a lawyer in 1995 and obtained a master's degree in law in 2012.

Bugeja practiced law in the private sector before joining the Attorney-General’s Office in 2006 as a prosecutor. Since October 2007 he also lectured in criminal law procedure at the University of Malta.

=== Magistrate ===
In July 2013 he was appointed Magistrate upon recommendation of Prime Minister Joseph Muscat's cabinet.

Following the Panama Papers leaks, Bugeja led the magisterial inquest into the Panamanian offshore company Egrant set up by lawyer Pawlu Lia on behalf of Prime Minister Joseph Muscat. Daphne Caruana Galizia reported that Muscat ordered the inquiry at 23:30, as Justice Bugeja would have been off duty from the day after. Caruana Galizia also stated that in April 2017 Bugeja unceremonially summoned her to come to Valletta to speak with him within one hour, in spite of procedures, which she refused to do.

While the report conclusions were published in July 2018, the remaining 97% of the inquiry report remains unavailable to the public. Justice Bugeja did not find evidence that Egrant was owned by Muscat or by his wife Michelle. In a series of leaked transcript, Justice Bugeja stated that "My terms of reference are not to investigate who Egrant belongs to".

=== Judge ===
In April 2019 he was appointed Judge upon recommendation of Prime Minister Joseph Muscat's cabinet.

In July 2019 Judge Bugeja was drawn by lot to preside the trial of the three alleged killers of Daphne Caruana Galizia. He abstained from presiding the trial, which was led instead by Judge Edwina Grima.

In 2021 Judge Bugeja was chosen by lot to preside the trial by jury of Yorgen Fenech, the alleged mastermind of Daphne Caruana Galizia's murder. He decided to abstain from leading the trial, noting that he had led a complex inquiry in which he had expressed himself about issues linked to the defence of the accused.

In November 2023, the Chief Justice reassigned Judge Bugeja from the criminal court to the family court.
