= Ian Bailey =

Ian Bailey may refer to:

- Ian Bailey (author) (born 1959), head buyer and later financial director of Games Workshop
- Ian Bailey (British Army soldier) (born 1959), Corporal in the Parachute Regiment
- Ian Bailey (footballer) (born 1956), English footballer
- Ian Bailey (journalist) (1957–2024), a suspect in the 1996 death of Sophie Toscan du Plantier
- Ian Spiteri Bailey (born 1968), Maltese judge

== See also ==
- Eion Bailey (born 1976), American actor
