= Monica Vella =

Maltese lawyer and politician

- Born: Monica Vella
- Occupation: Magistrate
- Years active: 2015–present

Monica Vella is a Maltese lawyer and politician, serving as Magistrate since 2015.

== Studies and legal practice ==
Vella graduated in Law (LL.D.) from the University of Malta in 1997 with a dissertation on civil procedure. The following year she started practising law and served as a judicial assistant before her magisterial appointment in 2015.

== Mayor of Xewkija ==
Vella served for a decade as Labour mayor of Xewkija, Gozo, from 2002 till 2013. At the 2013 local elections, she was overtaken as most-voted local councillor by Paul Azzopardi, who thus became the new mayor.

== Magistrate ==
Vella was appointed as a Magistrate in 2015 upon decision of Joseph Muscat's cabinet. Over a decade, she presided over numerous cases in the Magistrates’ Court, including criminal prosecutions and inquiries. In Gozo, she heard cases before the Civil Court (First Hall), Family Court, the Agricultural Rent Regulation Board, Rent Regulation Board and Court of Magistrates in its civil jurisdiction. She also presided over Malta’s Rent Regulation Board, and sit in the Court of Magistrates for both civil and criminal jurisdiction.

In 2021, Vella was removed from the Gozo Court and reassigned to the Law Courts in Valletta as part of administrative changes to manage case distribution. Data from 2019 and 2020 indicate that Vella had a substantial caseload before reassignment.

In October 2024, Judge Wenzu Mintoff publicly reprimanded Magistrate Monica Vella for "irresponsible behaviour" causing unnecessary delay to proceedings. Mintoff addressed the communiqué to the justice minister, the chief justice of Malta and the court registrar.

In 2025, Vella became the subject of formal disciplinary proceedings before the Commission for the Administration of Justice of Malta, following complaints about delays in issuing written decisions and other administrative failings. She was suspended from her duties for one month on half pay, a decision that was confirmed on appeal and could be further reviewed by the Constitutional Court. This was the first case of disciplinary proceedings against a judge or magistrate to be publicly reported in Malta.

During the disciplinary process, reporting noted that Vella had one of the higher numbers of pending criminal and tribunal cases among her peers, although staffing and other factors may have contributed to delays.

In March 2026, Vella sentence a woman to an 18-month prison term, suspended for three years, for having induced her own abortion using medication in early 2024. Vella claimed that abortion is an "absolute prohibition" under Malta's Criminal Code, regardless of the "viability of the foetus" or the stage of pregnancy. Her ruling was reversed in appeal in July 2026, with the court finding it legally defective (as magistrate Vella had not specified the applicable legal provision) and ordering the case to be heard again. The appeal judges also cautioned from legal stances leading to a ‘real risk’ that women may hide from doctors during emergencies for fear of being later subject to prosecution.

== See also ==
- Judicial accountability in Malta
- Judiciary of Malta
