= Opinion polling for the 2017 Maltese general election =

In the run up to the 2017 Maltese general election, various organisations carried out opinion polling to gauge voting intention in Malta. Results of such polls are displayed in this article.

The date range for these opinion polls are from the previous general election, held on 9 March 2013, to the day the next election was held, on 3 June 2017.

== Party vote ==
Poll results are listed in the table below in reverse chronological order, showing the most recent first. The highest percentage figure in each polling survey is displayed in bold, and the background shaded in the leading party's colour. In the instance that there is a tie, then no figure is shaded. The lead column on the right shows the percentage-point difference between the two parties with the highest figures. Poll results use the date the survey's fieldwork was done, as opposed to the date of publication. However, if such date is unknown, the date of publication will be given instead.

=== 2017 ===
Polling Firm	Date	PL	PN	AD	PD	Others	Lead
Sagalytics (Note: vincentmarmara.com)	1 Jun	53.5	44.0	2.5	with PN	0.0	9.5
Sagalytics	28 May	53.0	44.8	2.2	with PN	0.0	8.2
MaltaToday	28 May	52.2	46.9	0.9	with PN	0.0	5.3
Sagalytics	21 May	53.6	44.1	2.3	with PN	0.0	9.5
MaltaToday	21 May	51.9	47.3	0.8	with PN	0.0	4.6
Malta Independent	21 May	40.1	30.5	0.3	with PN	0.4	9.6
Sagalytics	14 May	55.9	43.5	0.5	with PN	0.1	12.4
MaltaToday	14 May	52.0	47.0	0.6	with PN	0.4	5.0
Malta Independent	14 May	42.3	35.0	1.9	with PN	0.6	7.3
Xarabank	12 May	50.6	48.0	1.4	with PN	0.0	2.6
MaltaToday	7 May	51.9	47.5	0.4	with PN	0.2	4.4
Malta Independent	7 May	42.3	36.6	0.5	with PN	0.4	5.7
	1 May	Prime Minister Muscat announces the snap election					
Sagalytics	30 Apr	55.1	42.9	0.8	0.0	0.9	12.1
MaltaToday	30 Apr	51.0	46.0	1.1	1.1	0.7	5
MaltaToday	Mar	51.0	45.1	1.6	1.2	1.2	5.9

=== 2016 ===
Polling Firm	Date	PL	PN	AD	PD	Others	Lead
MaltaToday	Nov	49.2	43.9	3.2	2.0	1.5	5.3
MaltaToday	Sep	48.7	44.5	3.3	2.3	1.2	4.2
MaltaToday	May	47.7	46.0	3.4	2.3	0.6	1.7
Malta Independent	24 Apr	47.0	42.2	4.0	6.0	1.0	4.8
MaltaToday	7–10 Mar	49.7	48.4	1.9	N/A	0.0	1.3
MaltaToday	17 Jan	51.4	47.0	1.5	N/A	0.0	4.4

=== 2015 ===
Polling Firm	Date	PL	PN	AD	Others	Lead
MaltaToday	4 Oct	**51.9**	45.3	2.7	0.1	6.6
MaltaToday	Jun	**52.6**	44.0	2.9	0.5	8.6
MaltaToday	Mar	**54.7**	41.9	3.4	0.0	12.8
MaltaToday	Jan	**56.1**	40.5	3.1	0.4	14.8

=== 2014 ===
Polling Firm	Date	PL	PN	AD	Others	Lead
Malta-Surveys	6–28 Aug	46.9	**47.2**	4.8	1.1	0.3
Malta-Surveys	21–27 Jul	**48.0**	46.8	4.3	0.9	1.2
Malta-Surveys	23–29 Jun	**47.1**	**47.1**	4.9	0.9	Tie
Malta-Surveys	21–31 May	46.9	**47.2**	5.0	0.9	0.3
Malta-Surveys	19–30 Apr	**47.9**	46.9	4.2	1.0	1.0
Malta-Surveys	15–31 Mar	45.8	**49.8**	3.4	1.0	4.0
Malta-Surveys	12–28 Feb	46.1	**49.0**	3.8	1.1	2.9
Malta-Surveys	27–31 Jan	47.1	**48.4**	3.6	0.9	1.3

=== 2013 ===
Polling Firm	Date	PL	PN	AD	Others	Lead
Malta-Surveys	21–31 Dec	47.0	**49.0**	3.0	1.0	2.0
Malta-Surveys	26–30 Nov	47.9	**48.0**	3.2	0.9	0.1
Malta-Surveys	26–30 Oct	47.4	**47.9**	3.1	1.6	0.5
Malta-Surveys	25–30 Sep	**49.4**	44.3	5.1	1.3	5.1
Malta-Surveys	31 Aug	**50.0**	46.0	3.0	1.0	4.0
Malta-Surveys	31 Jul	**50.0**	47.0	3.0	0.0	3.0
Malta-Surveys	29 Jun	**50.0**	47.0	2.0	1.0	3.0
Malta-Surveys	31 May	**51.0**	47.0	2.0	0.0	4.0
Malta-Surveys	30 Apr	**52.0**	46.0	2.0	0.0	6.0
**General elections**	**9 Mar 2013**	**54.8**	**43.3**	**1.8**	**0.3**	**11.5**
