= Giovanni Grixti =

Maltese judge

The Honourable Giovanni Grixti

Judge of the Supreme Courts of Malta
- In office 2015–2026

Magistrate of Malta
- In office 1996–2015

Giovanni Grixti, or Griscti (born ca. 1961) is a retired Maltese judge.

== Biography ==
Giovanni Grixti graduated in law (LL.D.) from the University of Malta in 1989. The following year, he obtained a Master of Laws (LL.M.) from the International Maritime Law Institute.

Grixti practiced with the law firm Farrugia, Gatt & Falzon and consulted for the Ministry of Environment and local councils. In 1992 Air Malta appointed him as chief legal adviser.

Grixti contributed to drafting laws and policies including the Local Council White Paper and the International Convention on Civil Liability for Oil Pollution Damage.

Grixti was also a guest lecturer at the University of Malta and taught aviation law with the European Pilot Academy and Malta School of Flying.

Grixti was reported to have a long-standing relationship with Tumas Group's Fenech family, exemplified by the purchase of a boat from Yorgen Fenech’s father in 2008, when Grixti was already a magistrate since over a decade.

=== Member of the Judiciary ===
In 1996 Grixti was appointed Magistrate by Alfred Sant's cabinet decision. He served as magistrate for 19 years. In 2008, he had 231 pending magisterial inquiries.

Grixti was appointed as Judge by Joseph Muscat's cabinet decision in 2015. The same year, Grixti started sitting in the Supreme Courts. In his inaugural address, Grixti called for specialised magistrates to be tasked with conducting inquiries, and for the Attorney General to take over from the police the task of prosecution. Grixti also applauded the "athletic" energy of Justice Minister Owen Bonnici in enacting "historic" reforms.

In April 2016, Natius Farrugia, mayor of Żurrieq, appealed a fined he had received in court for leading a mob in Rabat chasing down Daphne Caruana Galizia and forcing her to seek refuge in a convent. Judge Grixti confirmed the verdict but mistakenly converted the fine into four days of prison for disturbing the peace. Right after reading out the erroneous decision in open court, Grixti wrote a request for pardon to the President of Malta, who obliged. Farrugia was released within two hours. Minister Owen Bonnici commended Grixti's action, stating that "the judge showed great courage and a sense of justice". Caruana Galizia commented that "the abuse of power has been normalised". Following the confounding case, Justice Minister Owen Bonnici stated that the Chief Justice's office had investigated the actions of the judge. Judge Grixti was expected to appear in front of the Commission for the Administration of Justice of Malta, and possibly face disciplinary measures, as the inquiry had found the error was entirely his own. No information is available on whether the CAJ undertook disciplinary proceedings against Grixti, and with which outcome.

In January 2019, the Court of Appeals presided by Judge Grixti reversed a first instance decision by Magistrate Ian Farrugia ordering a magisterial inquiry into the 2016 Panama papers information about potential money laundering following request by former opposition leader Simon Busuttil in July 2018. Grixti ruled that Busuttil's request did not prove the crime. The decision was ignored by other magistrates, who ordered inquiries following requests based on the same evidence highlighted by Busuttil.

In September 2021, Judge Grixti filed a criminal complaint with the police against the Caruana Galizia family's lawyer and PN MP Jason Azzopardi over comments on social media that linked the Judge with the Fenech family, on the day that Grixti was expected to decide on Yorgen Fenech's bail request. Grixti claimed Azzopardi unlawfully tried to intimidate or force him to decide in a certain way. The Attorney General and the Police Commissioner dismissed the complaint. Grixti decided against granting bail to Fenech.

In January 2024, Judge Grixti recused himself from hearing the Steward/Vitals case brought by the Nationalist Party on the privatisation of three hospitals. Grixti recused himself following the appointment by rota of his partner, lawyer Yanika Bugeja, as curator representing Steward Assets Management Malta. State Advocate Christopher Soler claimed that Judge Grixti did not follow the proper procedures when recusing himself. Judge Grixti rejected the plea of the State Advocate, also deploring his "intimidatory" and "ferocious" tone.

In May 2024, Judge Grixti ruled that the Attorney General hand to Joseph Muscat all the sections of the Vitals inquiry that refer to him. The Attorney General ordered the State Advocate not to appeal the ruling, while NGO Repubblika, the initiators of the Vitals inquiry, was refused a copy.

Grixti retired in August 2026.
