= Henri Mizzi =

Maltese judge (born 1966)

Henri Mizzi (born 1966) is a Maltese judge.

== Biography ==
Henri Mizzi is the son of former Attorney-General Edgar Mizzi, who served when Dom Mintoff was Prime Minister of Malta. Henri Mizzi graduated in law from the University of Malta in 1988 and read a Master in law at Trinity College Cambridge.

In 1990 Mizzi joined the law firm Camilleri Preziosi Advocates, advising corporate clients. He became partner of the law firm in 1995, and in 2000 Henri Mizzi and Louis de Gabriele took over management of the law firm. He retired from private practice in 2021, focusing on arbitration.

Mizzi was appointed judge in September 2023 by recommendation of the Judicial Appointments Committee and task to preside over commercial disputes. In his inaugural speech, Mizzi called for lawyers to pay an annual fee "for the privilege of holding a licence to practise their profession". As a member of the judiciary, he is known for his strict courtroom management. Mizzi also served as Malta's representative on the judges' network of the European Union Intellectual Property Office (EUIPO).

As one of the most senior judges, in late 2025 Mizzi was deemed a candidate to succeed Mark Chetcuti as Chief Justice of Malta, although as an "outsider" he was not in pole position due to "perceived aloofness and limited popularity among colleagues" and doubts of whether he would gather support by the opposition Nationalist Party.

== See also ==
- Judiciary of Malta
