= Mangion =

Mangion is a Maltese surname. Notable people with the surname include:

- Charles Mangion (born 1952), Maltese politician
- Robert Mangion, Maltese judge
- Silvio Mangion (born 1965), Maltese serial killer
- William Mangion (born 1958), Maltese singer
