= Gabriella Vella =

Maltese magistrate

Gabriella Vella (born ca. 1965-1968) is a Maltese magistrate who serves as Senior Magistrate in Malta.. She was appointed to the judiciary in 2009 and has presided over civil and criminal proceedings. She has also chaired the Administrative Review Tribunal and has conducted magisterial inquiries into matters of public interest, including the concession of public hospitals to Vitals Global Healthcare and Steward Health Care.

== Biography ==
Vella graduated in law in 1999. Before her appointment to the judiciary, she worked in civil and commercial law and served as an arbiter. She also chaired the Consumer Affairs Appeals Board and the Small Claims Tribunal.

In September 2009, the Government of Malta approved her appointment as magistrate, alongside Claire Stafrace Zammit. The announcement noted Vella's experience in civil and commercial law.

As a magistrate, Vella has presided over civil and criminal cases before the Court of Magistrates of Malta. Her judicial work has included proceedings involving criminal offences and civil disputes.

Vella serves as Senior Magistrate of Malta. The office is assigned by the Chief Justice and involves duties determined by the Chief Justice or by law. The Judiciary Malta website lists her as the current holder of the position.

In February 2011, Vella was appointed chairperson of the Administrative Review Tribunal for a three-year term.

=== Vitals and Steward hospitals inquiry ===
Vella led a magisterial inquiry into the concession of three Maltese public hospitals to Vitals Global Healthcare, subsequently transferred to Steward Health Care. The inquiry resulted in criminal charges against former prime minister Joseph Muscat, former minister Konrad Mizzi, former chief of staff Keith Schembri, and other individuals in connection with the hospital concession. The inquiry and its consequences attracted considerable political and media attention.

In October 2025, Vella was shortlisted for appointment as judge but was finally not selected.

In September 2026, Vella was again included on a shortlist of candidates considered suitable for appointment as a judge of Malta's Superior Courts. President Myriam Spiteri Debono selected Leonard Caruana for the first vacancy and Elaine Rizzo for the second.

== See also ==
- Judiciary of Malta
