= Commissioner for Standards of the Judiciary (Malta) =

The Commissioner for Standards in the Judiciary is a constitutional office in Malta responsible for overseeing ethical conduct and handling complaints against members of the judiciary, including judges and magistrates. The office was established through constitutional reforms in 2025 aimed at strengthening ethical standards, accountability, and public confidence in the judicial system. The commissioner does not act as a court of appeal, but investigates alleged ethical breaches and reports findings to appropriate authorities. The role is designed to provide structured and more accessible disciplinary oversight within Malta’s judiciary.

== Background ==
Prior to 2025, complaints and concerns about judicial conduct in Malta could be submitted to either the chief justice or the minister for justice. As part of a package of constitutional amendments debated in Parliament in 2025, the role of Commissioner for Standards in the Judiciary was created to provide a direct and formal mechanism for individuals, including members of the public, to submit complaints and for those complaints to be investigated in camera. The reforms were supported by the Labour government but opposed by the PN opposition on some clauses, though the commissioner’s role was introduced with a simple majority vote.

The purpose of the role is to reinforce integrity and accountability in the judiciary, address public concerns about judicial conduct, and complement the disciplinary authority of the Commission for the Administration of Justice within Malta’s constitutional framework. A broader ethical code for judges and magistrates was also part of the reform discussions.

== Functions ==
Based on Article 101AA of the Constitution of Malta, the commissioner for standards in the judiciary is tasked with the following functions:

- Receiving complaints and written concerns regarding the conduct of judges and magistrates from the public, the chief justice, or the minister for justice.
- Investigating complaints in camera; hearing all parties involved and gathering relevant information.
- Reporting findings in writing to the chief justice and the minister, with a copy to the judicial officer under investigation.
- Determining whether there is sufficient evidence to initiate disciplinary proceedings.
- Where appropriate, acting as prosecutor on behalf of a complainant before the Committee for Judges and Magistrates within the Commission for the Administration of Justice.

The commissioner does not have the authority to impose disciplinary sanctions directly or re‑evaluate court decisions. Final disciplinary action remains with the Commission for the Administration of Justice of Malta or the relevant committee empowered under Maltese law.

== Appointment and tenure ==
The commissioner is appointed by the Commission for the Administration of Justice of Malta, a constitutional body tasked with overseeing judicial discipline and standards, including judges and magistrates. The appointment is for a three‑year term, and the role may be held by a retired judge or magistrate, or a lawyer who is no longer practising, as outlined in the constitutional provisions establishing the office.

== First Commissioner ==
The first commissioner for standards in the judiciary is Toni Abela, a retired judge who was sworn in in December 2025. Following his oath of office before the president of Malta, Abela stated his intention to uphold the role’s integrity and emphasised that it should not be used as a tool to undermine judicial decisions or serve as a court of appeal. He pledged to work to ensure that the office serves public trust and accountability while respecting judicial independence. The appointment ceremony was attended by senior state officials including the president, prime minister, and justice minister.

== Reception and commentary ==
Supporters of the reforms, including in the judiciary itself, have described the creation of the commissioner’s office as a positive step toward enhancing transparency in judicial conduct and providing the public with a clearer avenue for raising concerns. Critics in Parliament, particularly from the opposition, argued that some of the constitutional reform package should have been broader, although the establishment of the standards commissioner was ultimately approved by simple majority. Observers noted that the role is intended to strike a balance between accountability and judicial independence.

== See also ==
- Judiciary of Malta
- Commission for the Administration of Justice (Malta)
- Judicial accountability in Malta
