= Francesco Depasquale =

Maltese judge (born 1970)

Francesco Depasquale (born June 1970 in Attard) is a Maltese judge, since January 2023 president of the Council of Europe's European Commission for the Efficiency of Justice (CEPEJ).

== Biography ==
=== Studies ===
The son of Judge Franco Depasquale (who retired in 2003), Francesco Depasquale studied at Stella Maris College, Gżira. He attended the University of Malta, where he obtained a Diploma of Notary Public in 1993, andgraduated as Doctor of Laws (LL.D.) in 1995.

Depasquale was an active member of Malta's Law Student’s Association (Għ.S.L.), helpedfound the Malta branch of the European Law Students' Association in 1991 and served as its general secretary and then president. In 1994 he was elected to the University Students’ Council (KSU).

=== Legal practice ===
In 1996 Francesco Depasquale obtained a Masters from the International Maritime Law Institute and the same year was called to the bar. He was a litigation lawyer before his appointment to the judiciary.

He was active in the Malta Maritime Law Association and in the Chamber of Advocates.

He served on the Committee for Advocates and Legal Procurators and on the disciplinary committee of the Commission for the Administration of Justice of Malta between 1999 and 2008. He was also legal advisor to the Registrar of Courts between 2006 and 2011, and was part-time judicial assistant at the First Hall of the Civil Court.

In 2006 Depasquale was made Commissioner for Justice (Central Region). He also served at the Malta Arbitration Centre.

In 2007 Depasquale was appointed as Malta’s representative at the European Commission for the Efficiency of Justice (CEPEJ) of the Council of Europe. In 2018 he was elected to the bureau of CEPEJ for a two-year mandate.

=== Member of the Judiciary ===
==== Magistrate ====
On 28 April 2011 Depasquale was appointed Magistrate by Prime Minister Lawrence Gonzi, being assigned by the Chief Justice all the libel and defamation cases.

In 2012 he was elected to the board of the Association of Judges and Magistrates of Malta. He initially served as general secretary, and was elected president in 2020.

==== Judge ====
In 2019 Depasquale was promoted to a judge. He was assigned to sit in the Civil Court, including constitutional jurisdiction.

Upon appointment, he recalled how Malta's judicial system remains understaffed and underfunded, and called for more direct public communication efforts by the courts to help stave off political attacks on the judiciary.

In December 2022 Depasquale was elected president of the European Commission for the Efficiency of Justice (CEPEJ) for a period of two years starting from January 2023. He was re-elected in December 2024 for two more years.

In February 2023, in the Vitals case (filed in 2018 by then Opposition leader Adrian Delia), Judge Depasquale handed down a strong ruling against the Maltese government, underlining its "amateurish" checks and lack of due diligence and annulling the privatisation deal.

In April 2024, Depasquale dismissed an injunction by BirdLife Malta aimed at preventing the opening of the spring hunting season for the turtle dove. According to Malta Today, "Depasquale argued as if he were an ornithologist representing the hunting lobby".

In February 2025, in a landmark decision for the European e-gaming and gambling sector (Felsberger case), Judge Depasquale ruled against the enforcement in Malta, based on EU Treaties, of Austrian court judgements ordering the refund of player losses, thus shielding Malta Gaming Authority-licensed operators. The ruling acknowledged the supremacy of EU Law over ordinary Maltese law, but not over the Maltese Constitution, since EU Law takes effect based on Malta's European Union Act 2003, and the Parliament is bound to legislate in line with the Constitution. The European Commission has since opened an infringement procedure against Malta for breach of EU Law.

== See also ==
- Judiciary of Malta
