= Doreen Clarke =

Maltese judge

Doreen Clarke (1965-68) is a Maltese judge. She was appointed magistrate in 2007, and judge in 2022.

== See also ==
- Judiciary of Malta
