= Grima (band) =

Russian atmospheric black metal band

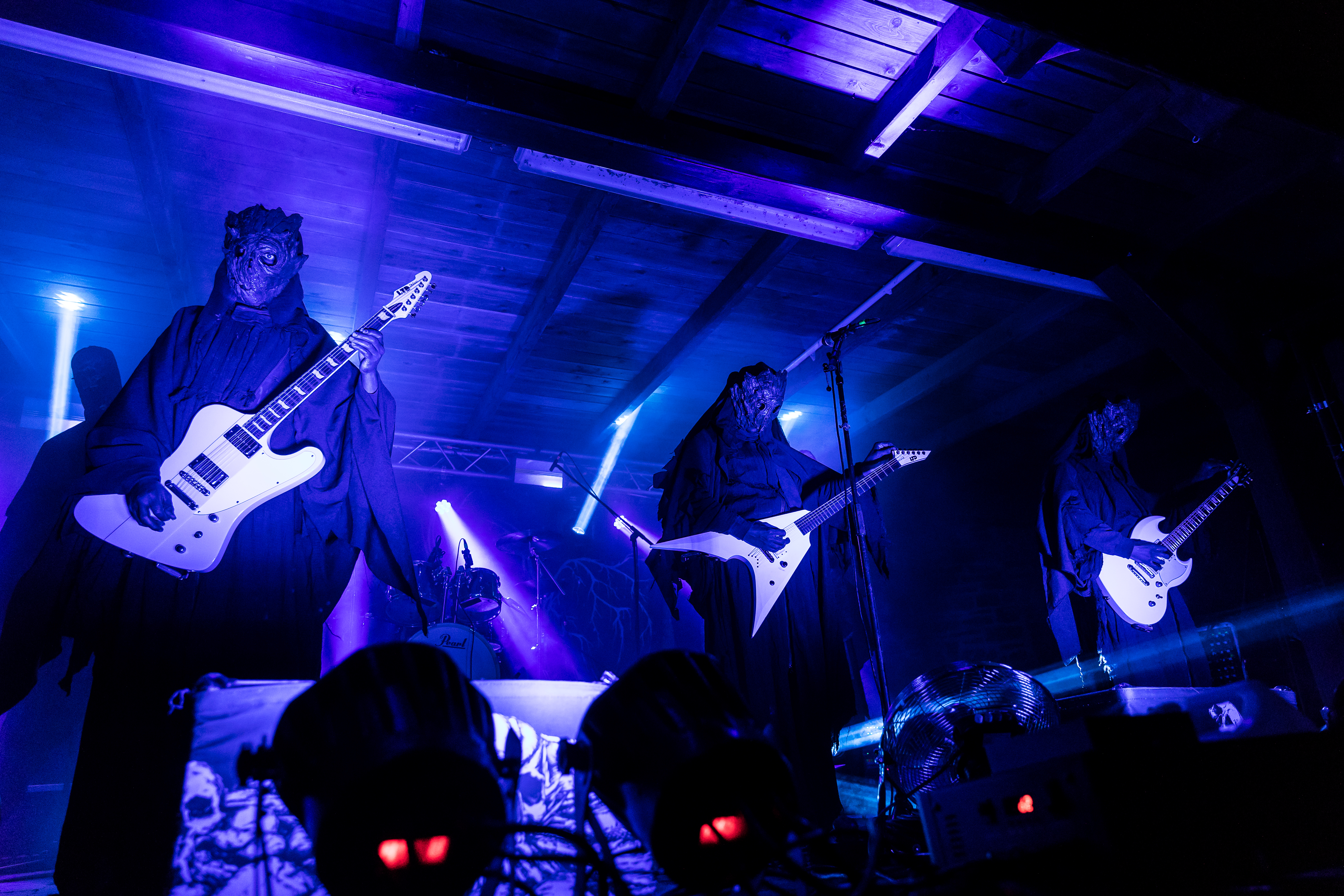
- Grima at the Dark Troll Open Air festival in Bornstedt, Germany, in 2025

Background information
- Origin: Krasnoyarsk, Russia
- Genres: Atmospheric black metal
- Years active: 2014-present
- Labels: Naturmacht Productions; Napalm Records
- Spinoffs: Ultar, Second To Sun
- Members: Morbius (Maxim Sysoev) - guitars, bass Vilhelm (Gleb Sysoev) - vocals, guitars, bass, keyboards
- Website: grimablackmetal.com

Grima is a Russian atmospheric black metal band from Krasnoyarsk, founded in 2014 by twin brothers Maxim "Morbius" Sysoev and Gleb "Vilhelm" Sysoev. The project began as a studio-only undertaking and later developed into a full live band. Its imagery and lyrics are built around Siberian nature, the taiga, night forests, cold landscapes and a mythology of ancient forest spirits.

Gleb and Maxim regard Grima as a personal project that exists in parallel with their other band, Ultar, as well as with Vladimir Lehtinen's post-black metal project Second To Sun, in which Gleb provides vocals and Maxim plays bass.

== Biography ==
=== Formation and early albums (2014–2020) ===
Grima was conceived in 2014 by the twin brothers Maxim "Morbius" Sysoev and Gleb "Vilhelm" Sysoev. In a 2025 interview, Vilhelm said that the band was not a live act at the beginning and remained a studio project until its fourth album, Rotten Garden; as the audience grew, the group began to play concerts and its touring activity quickly increased. Metal Insider likewise described the band as having moved from studio work to the stage after its third album, with musicians from Ultar becoming part of its live and studio line-up.

The band's mythology centers on the figure of Grima and on a Siberian forest world. Vilhelm described the band's visual identity as ancient forest spirits and manifestations of Grima, while the music and performances were intended to take on a ritual or ceremonial character. In other interviews, the musicians linked the project to the taiga, the red mountains around Krasnoyarsk, the Yenisei and Mana rivers, and the forested landscape around their city.

Their debut album, Devotion to Lord (2015), was released by Naturmacht Productions. It was followed by Tales of the Enchanted Woods (2017) and Will of the Primordial (2019). The early albums established the band's long-form melodic approach, moving between aggressive black metal sections and ambient or folk-colored passages while developing the project's forest mythology.

=== Consolidation, touring and Nightside (2020-present) ===
In 2020, Grima released a new version of Devotion to Lord. The group followed it with its fourth studio album, Rotten Garden, on 22 January 2021. The album received attention from specialist press: Metal Storm gave it a score of 8 out of 10, while the Russian cultural magazine Colta.ru included it in an overview of new music from Siberia. The band's first official live presentation of this material was recorded for the live album The Mighty Spirit (2021).

On 29 July 2022, Grima released its fifth full-length studio album, Frostbitten. Through the album's music and lyrics, the group intensified its winter imagery and concept, which revolve around extreme cold, mountain landscapes, blizzards and the hostility of northern nature. The songs on the album include representative pieces such as "Gloomy Heart of the Coldest Land", "Giants Eternal Sleep", "Hunger God" and "Winter Morning Tower".

At the beginning of 2023, the band returned to Europe as part of the Frostbitten European Premiere Tour 2023, promoting its fifth album. The tour spanned much of the continent, visiting countries including France, Germany, Poland, Italy, Belgium, the Netherlands, Austria, the Czech Republic, Slovakia and Switzerland. For most of this European itinerary, the band shared stages and co-headlined shows with the German act Kanonenfieber.

Between 25 April and 22 May 2024, the group carried out its European tour Under The Sign Of The Last Spruce 2024. Although various international logistical problems forced the cancellation of several dates originally scheduled in Central Europe, the Siberian band successfully completed live appearances across a route that included Switzerland, Germany, Italy, Spain, Portugal and France, ending with a closing show in Paris. The concert circuit also featured the German atmospheric black metal band Antrisch and the melodic black metal group Non Est Deus as special guests.

According to Metal Insider, the band had been releasing albums roughly every two years and touring consistently by the time Napalm Records approached them in early 2024; Morbius stated that the group had played nearly one hundred shows across Europe in the preceding years. In interviews around Nightside, the band described its touring life as having gained momentum after the studio-only phase, and discussed a new European tour in support of the album.

On 28 February 2025, Grima released its sixth studio album, Nightside, its first album for Napalm Records. The band said that much of the music was written in summer 2023 after its second European tour, and that the album was recorded in Krasnoyarsk using an old-school, analog-oriented studio approach. Vladimir Lehtinen handled the mixing and mastering; the musicians had worked with him for several albums. The album includes elements of folk instrumentation, such as the traditional Russian accordion or bayan, to intensify the hypnotic textures of the music.

The album's concept focuses on the night side of the forest: tangled paths, lost or cursed souls, ancient stumps and the mystical darkness of the Siberian taiga. Musically, the band said it tried to move away from some familiar black metal rhythmic patterns, relying less on blast beats and tremolo picking while retaining the genre's heaviness. The recording continued the band's use of folk instrumentation, including Sergey Pastukh's bayan and Valentina Astashova's keyboards; the musicians described the bayan as an expressive signature instrument chosen for its sound rather than for regional folk authenticity. The cover art for Nightside was created by Italian artist Paolo Girardi.

The band also released videos for material from Nightside, including "Skull Gatherers" and "The Flight of the Silver Storm". In interviews, Morbius and Vilhelm said the videos were filmed in forests around Krasnoyarsk, on the banks of the Yenisei, and around the Mana River landscape, with some winter filming taking place in temperatures below -20 °C.

As part of the album's promotional cycle, on 29 May 2025 the group appeared at the German festival Dark Troll Open Air, held in the historic amphitheater of Schweinsburg Castle in Bornstedt, Germany, performing in a prime slot as one of the main headliners on the festival's first day.

On 21 June 2025, Grima appeared at Hellfest Summer Open Air in Clisson, France. Metal Has No Borders described the performance as snow-covered, folk-tinged atmospheric black metal on the festival's Temple stage, with a set drawing from Frostbitten, Will of the Primordial and especially Nightside. The same report listed the live line-up as Vilhelm, Morbius, drummer Vlad Yungman (Ultar, Morokh) and guitarist Denis Susarev (Ultar).

== Members ==
=== Core members ===
- Morbius (Maxim Sysoev) - guitars, bass
- Vilhelm (Gleb Sysoev) - vocals, guitars, bass, keyboards

=== Live members ===
- Vlad Yungman - drums
- Denis Susarev - guitar

== Discography ==
=== Studio albums ===
- Devotion to Lord - 2015
- Tales of the Enchanted Woods - 2017
- Will of the Primordial - 2019
- Rotten Garden - 2021
- Frostbitten - 2022
- Nightside - 2025

=== Live albums ===
- The Mighty Spirit (Live in Moscow) - 2021
- Red Forest Ritual - 2023

=== Singles ===
- Devotion to Lord - 2020
- Giant's Eternal Sleep - 2022
