= Audrey Demicoli =

Maltese judge

Audrey Demicoli (Born 1968 or 1969) is a Maltese judge. She was appointed magistrate in 2006 and judge in 2021.

== See also ==
- Judiciary of Malta
