= Joseph R. Micallef =

Maltese judge

Joseph R. Micallef (born 30 March 1956) is a Maltese judge. He is a graduate of the University of Malta. He represented Malta at the United Nations Conference on the Law of Treaties Between States and International Organisations (known as Vienna II) in 1986 and signed the final convention on behalf of Malta.

== See also ==
- Judiciary of Malta
