= Anton Cassar =

Maltese journalist and editor

Anton Cassar (1924 – 30 June 2014) was a Maltese journalist and editor, who founded L-Orizzont, a national daily newspaper, in 1962. Cassar also served as L-Orizzont's first editor.

Cassar was born in Marsa, Malta, in 1924. He started his career as a journalist at Il-Berqa in 1946. He was awarded the Gold Award from the Institute of Maltese Journalists (IMJ) for his work. He also received a lifetime achievement award from the National Book Council in 2013.

Anton Cassar died on 30 June 2014, at the age of 90.
