= Capital Radio Malta =

Radio station in Valletta, Malta

Capital 88.7
Valletta; Malta
- Frequency: 88.7 MHz
- Branding: Capital Radio

History
- First air date: unknown
- Last air date: 1 April 2009; 16 years ago

Technical information
- Transmitter coordinates: 35°53′54″N 14°31′00″E

Capital 88.7 (Capital Radio) was a national radio station in Malta broadcasting on the frequency 88.7 FM.

== Station's history ==
Originally, the broadcasting licence was awarded to Alt Services, an organisation created by Alternattiva Demokratika, a nascent local political party that espouses environmentally responsible policies. In fact the radio station, originally called "Radju Alternattiva," started out as a political radio station, competing with other local political radios such as Radio 101 and the state's radio stations.

On July 1, 1998 the radio station changed its name to "Capital Radio", significantly toned down its political activities, and focused more on 1980s music. In time, political broadcasts ceased entirely.

At the time, the management of the radio station was in the hands of Mediacoop Ltd, a media cooperative. Mediacoop's Managing Director is [John Mallia]. In July 2005, Mediacoop bought the station's license from its previous owners Alt Services and so came to own the station as well. Since October 2005 Capital Radio has been housed in a state of the art complex in St. Ursula Street, Valletta.

Mediacoop stopped broadcasting as of 00:00 of Wednesday, 1 April 2009, after it agreed to transfer its broadcasting license to new operators. Mediacoop said that it wanted to focus more on other aspects of its commercial portfolio. Since then, Capital Radio continued to transmit non-stop music from all pop genres from the 1980s up to the 2000s, until the new management took over and began its own broadcasting.

== Programming ==
With a heavy focus on 1980s music, Capital Radio was quite popular with listeners in the 25-45 age bracket. Capital Radio had a strong presenter line up. Capital Radio also organised social events, such as the station's birthday bash every summer. Capital Radio was also popular abroad, with thousands of listeners tuning in over the net.
