= Ramin Gurbanov =

Azerbaijani lawyer

- Ramin Afad oğlu Qurbanov
- Born: 10 May 1974 (age 51); Baku, Azerbaijan
- Citizenship: Azerbaijani
- Education: Faculty of international law and international relations of the Baku State University, Northwestern University Pritzker School of Law
- Awards: Council of Europe, Azerbaijan National Academy of Sciences, Judicial-Legal Council, Ministry of Justice
- Scientific career
- Fields: International law, criminal law, European law and human rights
- Institutions: President of the European Commission for the Efficiency of Justice (CEPEJ) of the Council of Europe, judge

Ramin Afad oglu Gurbanov (Garagurbanlı) (Azerbaijani: Ramin Afad oğlu Qurbanov (Qaraqurbanlı)) is an Azerbaijani lawyer, scholar, and the current president of the European Commission for the Efficiency of Justice (CEPEJ) of the Council of Europe. He is also a judge of the Baku Court of Appeal, a member of the Management Board of the Union of Associations of Judges of the Republic of Azerbaijan, and the Head of the Department of International Law of the Institute of Law and Human Rights at the Azerbaijan National Academy of Sciences. He is a Doctor of Law and Professor of the Department of Civil Law Disciplines at the Russian University of Economics.

Gurbanov is the head of the Ministry of Justice working group on establishment and implementation of the e-court system in Azerbaijan, an expert of international projects in the field of evaluation and organization of court systems in Europe, and a coordinator for the World Bank and Azerbaijan Government's joint large-scale projects on the modernization of Azerbaijan's court system. He is also a member of the expert group on legal sciences (which is responsible for the verification and issue of scientific law degrees) of the High Attestation Commission under the President of the Republic of Azerbaijan.

== Education ==
In 1990, Gurbanov graduated with a medal from Secondary School N134 in Baku. In 1995, he graduated with a diploma of honor from the Faculty of International Law and International Relations from Baku State University. From 1996 to 1998, he carried out his postgraduate studies in Baku State University. From 1997 to 2000, he continued his education in the military faculty of the Azerbaijan State Pedagogical University. In 2003, he graduated from the Academy of Public Administration and in 2006 from the Russian Law Academy of the Russian Federation.

In 2002, he ran scientific research on judicial independence and human rights protection by US courts in the International Center for Human Rights of the School of Law at the Northwestern University. He also ran research on "The role of the US Department of Justice in the protection of human rights" in the Division on Civil Rights of the US Department of Justice. He successfully finalized his scientific research on the topic "Judges' education is an essential element of their personal independence" in the US Federal Judicial Center, which is the specialized training and educational center of US federal judges.

Ramin is a certified KPI professional who successfully passed the training courses on "e-Governance Strategies for Courts' Management: time requirements, solutions, innovations" in the Singapore Judicial Institute as well as the advanced courses on "Judicial management, organization of work in courts and e-case management" organized by the International Law Institute and Georgetown University.

== Work experience ==
Gurbanov started working in 1995 as a legal consultant in the military division of the Ministry of Defense. From 1998 to 2013 he worked in the Ministry of Justice as an advisor; a senior advisor in the field of drafting the legislative acts, organization of court activity, work with courts and justice institutions; and the head of the General Department on Organization and Supervision of the Ministry of Justice of the Republic of Azerbaijan.

He was a member of the group on the development of statutory documents regulating the activities of the Ministry of Justice as well as of the group on Application of Modern Information Technologies in the Justice Institutions.

In the years 2013–2020, he worked as a judge in the Baku City Yasamal District Court. During those years, he delivered the highest number of judgments with acquittals in the country. As of 2020, he is a judge of the Criminal Division of the Baku Court of Appeal.

In 2014, he worked as the head of the group of the Ministry of Justice on the establishment and implementation of the "e-Court" system in Azerbaijan. In recent years the international organizations awarded the "e-Court" and "e-Enforcement" systems, which were developed by the same group. In a sub-component of these systems, artificial intelligence was implemented to deliver judgments instead of human judges.

The modern functionalities of this system such as the mobile application of the "e-Court system", system on digital commercial disputes, the personal cabinet of court users, and the unified judicial portal have been implemented. In 2017 the new analytical module of the "e-Court system" was awarded for the first time within the Council of Europe's "Crystal Scales of Justice" competition.

== Work within the Council of Europe institutions ==
Gurbanov has been an official representative of the Republic of Azerbaijan in the European Commission for the Efficiency of Justice (CEPEJ) of the Council of Europe since 2005. CEPEJ is an advisory and analytical institution of the Council of Europe that specializes in increasing the efficiency and quality of justice in European countries.

During past years, he participated in peer-evaluation missions to Switzerland, Estonia, Cyprus, Georgia and Slovakia, and presided over the groups to Lithuania, Latvia, Kazakhstan, Czech Republic, North Macedonia, and Moldova. In 2014, the CEPEJ meeting was held in Baku.

In 2014–2018 Gurbanov was elected as one of the four members of the Bureau of the European Commission for the CEPEJ of Europe, and afterward was elected to the position of vice-president. On 4 December 2018 he was elected as president of the CEPEJ through secret ballot voting by the representatives from 47 member states of the Council of Europe.

== Cooperation with the World Bank ==
Gurbanov has been a coordinator of the World Bank (WB) large-scale transformation projects on the modernization of Azerbaijan court system since 2008; these projects are jointly implemented with the Government of Azerbaijan. These projects developed new standards on court infrastructure, organized the official opening ceremonies of the modern court buildings and complexes with participation of the Head of the State, designed and implemented "e-Court" and "e-Enforcement" systems, drafted the law on mediation in cooperation with the CEPEJ, piloted mediation centers, and performed studies and made recommendations on modernizing the Bar Association, establishing private enforcement offices, juvenile justice, gender policy in the field of justice, and the quality of judgments.

On the eves of the 20th and 25th anniversaries of cooperation between the Government of Azerbaijan and the World Bank, the projects have been awarded as the best administered and implemented WB projects in Azerbaijan.

Gurbanov is also the Azerbaijan reporter for the Doing Business Report (indicator on contract enforcement). In 2019, Azerbaijan was ranked in 28th place among the 190 countries after being in 40th place the previous year.

== Scientific and pedagogical activity ==
Since 1996, Gurbanov has been engaged in scientific work on legal issues. He was a postgraduate researcher at the law faculty of Baku State University and afterwards the senior researcher in the Institute of Philosophy, Sociology and Law of the Azerbaijan National Academy of Sciences. In 2002, he defended his scientific dissertation "Combating the criminal water pollution: on materials of Kura and Araks rivers". In 2016, he received the scientific degree — doctor of law. His thesis of doctorate work is "Co-operation of the judicial authorities on the European continent: theoretical and practical issues".

He specializes in the fields of international law, criminal law, European law, and human rights.

Between 2011 and 2016, he worked as a senior scientific consultant in the Department on International Relations and International Law of the Institute of Philosophy, Sociology and Law of the Azerbaijan National Academy of Sciences. Since 2017, he has been a senior scientific consultant of the Department on International Law and currently heads this department.

Gurbanov is a member of the group on legal sciences (responsible for the verification and issue of the scientific degrees in law) of the High Attestation Commission under the President of the Republic of Azerbaijan.

Gurbanov has been engaged in pedagogical work since 2004. Between 2004 and 2005, he worked as a teacher in the Department of Civil-Procedure Law at Odlar Yurdu University. He delivered lectures on training judges and prosecutors under the Judicial-Legal Council of Azerbaijan. Since 2009, he has been working as a lecturer at the Justice Academy, and in 2018 he was acting vice-directo.

Gurbanov is a member of numerous international organizations, such as the American Bar Association (Chicago division), the Russian Association on International Law, and the Union of Associations of Judges of Azerbaijan.

== Publications ==
Gurbanov has written more than 98 scientific publications on different aspects of international, European, and criminal law, including those published in cooperation with European doctors of law Jean-Paul Jean, Jacques Buehler, and Francois Paychere. Among his publications are scientific studies of the European Commission for the Efficiency of Justice (CEPEJ) of the Council of Europe.

- European Judicial Systems. Efficiency and Quality of Justice, N20, 2014. — Strasbourg.
- European Judicial Systems: eastern Europe countries, N21, December 2015. — Strasbourg.
- European Commission for the Efficiency of Justice: high-quality justice for all member states, N22, 2015. — Strasbourg.
- European Judicial Systems: Use of information technology in European courts. N24.
- R. A. Kurbanov, R. A. Gurbanov et al., Anthropological Methods of Formation of University Students' Spiritual and Moral Culture. // International Journal of Environmental and Science Education, Volume 11 Issue 18 (2016), р. 11807–11817.
- The European Judicial Network and Eurojust as basic means of the cooperation of EU Member States in the area of criminal justice // SENTENTIA. European Journal of Humanities and Social Sciences, No.3.
- E-court system with the installation of business and artificial intelligence, predictive justice, and KPIs // Impact Azerbaijan, American Chamber of Commerce.
- CEPEJ as the consultative body of the Council of Europe, granted with the responsibility of developing and implementing common standards in the sphere of the delivery of justice // On international legislation and comparative law, No.6(55), 2015.
- M. Schmitz, P. Gielen et d`autres, Avoirs Dematerializes et Execution Force Digital Assets and Enforcement // Conseil de l`Europe, Bruylant, Pratique de droit europeen (preface). Bruxelles.
- J. Mairimanoff, M. Becker, F. Oudin, A. Schumacher, C. Smets-Gary, Dictionnaire de la Mediation et d`Autres Modes Amiables // Bruylant, Collection Paradigme (preface). Suisse.

== Awards ==
Gurbanov was awarded several times for his contributions to the development of the justice system in Azerbaijan by the Minister of Justice of Azerbaijan. The Judicial-Legal Council of the Republic of Azerbaijan awarded him for his contributions to the effective and successful implementation of the World Bank projects on modernization of the Azerbaijan court system, for proper presentation of the country in the CEPEJ, and developing the "e-Court system", which was awarded within the Council of Europe's "Crystal Scales of Justice" competition.

The decision of the Azerbaijan National Academy of Sciences awarded Gurbanov for scientific productivity, active participation in the work of the Academy of Sciences, for "effective presentation of Azerbaijan science in the international fora, for the organization on a high level for the first time in the country of the international conference on artificial intelligence", and for the publication of the three-volume international encyclopedia on court systems.

In December 2018, he was awarded the medal named after professor Rovshan Mustafayev.
