= European Commission for the Efficiency of Justice =

The European Commission for the Efficiency of Justice (CEPEJ) is a judicial body, composed of experts from all the 46 member States of the Council of Europe and develops tools to improve the efficiency and functioning of justice in Europe (including granting observer status to and consultations with non-governmental organisations outside Europe). Its tasks are to:

- Analyse the results of judicial systems.
- Identify the problems they might meet.
- Define concrete means to, first, improve evaluation of performances of the judicial system and then, the functioning of those systems.
- Improve the implementation of existing Council of Europe instruments and suggest, if necessary, new instruments.
- Assist a state, at its request.

To realize those tasks, the CEPEJ elaborates indicators, collects and analyses data, defines measures and means of evaluation, drafts various documents (reports, opinions, guidelines, action plans, etc.), develops links with research institutes and documentation centre, invite qualified persons, NGO, conduct hearings, develops networks of judicial professionals.

The CEPEJ presidents became:

- Eberhard Desch (Germany) 2002–2006,
- Fausto de Santis (Italy) 2007–2010,
- John Stacey (United Kingdom) 2011–2014,
- Georg Stawa (Austria) 2015–2018,
- Ramin Gurbanov (Azerbaijan) 2018–2022.
- Francesco Depasquale (Malta) 2023–present.
