= George Grech =

Former Police Commissioner of Malta

George Grech is the former Police Commissioner of Malta, being in this position from November 1992 to October 2001, when he resigned following scandal.

In 2001 Magistrate Miriam Hayman found sufficient prima facie evidence to prosecute Grech for attempted rape, misuse of public funds, misuse of the telephone system, threat and blackmail. Grech attempted to discredit Hayman's credibility by claiming that her friendship with a Chinese woman had led to Hayman's decision to stop her attempted deportation.
