= Joanne Vella Cuschieri =

Maltese judge

Joanne Vella Cuschieri (born in 1976 in Mellieha) is a Maltese judge.

Vella Cuschieri graduated in law in 2001, after which she practiced as a lawyer, including by serving as a legal consultant to Malta's General Workers' Union and the Union of Technical and Clerical within the planning authority since 2005.

She contested the 2013 Maltese general election for Joseph Muscat's Labour, without being elected.

In 2014 she was appointed as a Magistrate by Justice Minister Owen Bonnici, whom Daphne Caruana Galizia reported was her "close friend". Vella Cuschieri's promotion was challenged in court by the NGO Repubblika, who claimed the procedure did not follow the recommendations of the Council of Europe's Venice Commission aimed at removing the discretion of the Prime Minister in the appointment of members of Malta's judiciary.

== See also ==
- Judiciary of Malta
