= Robert Mangion =

Maltese judge

Robert Mangion is a Maltese judge

== Biography ==
Robert Mangion obtained a Doctor of Laws degree in 1986 and worked in private practice for 25 years, focusing on civil law, family law and commercial law.

In 1991 Mangion was appointed to chair Malta's Employment Commission (a constitutional body on industrial disputes). He served in the post for nine years.

In June 2003 Mangion was chosen to chair Malta's Chamber of Advocates, replacing Joseph Azzopardi upon his appointment as Judge. As President of the Chamber, Mangion became ex officio member of the Commission for the Administration of Justice of Malta. He was re-elected for two more years in 2005.

Mangion was appointed as Judge in May 2012 under Prime Minister Lawrence Gonzi.

Mangion served for six years in Malta's family court, from 2012 till 2018, gaining appreciation for his "fairness, diligence and child-centred approach". His reassignment to the civil court was seen as "a loss" by some specialists.

In 2023, as judge of the merits, Mangion rejected the State Advocate's preliminary pleas to stop the case brought by BirdLife Malta against the government over the opening of Malta’s Spring hunting season.

== See also ==
- Judiciary of Malta
