= Tonio Mallia =

Maltese judge

Tonio Mallia (born 29 November 1955) is a Maltese judge. He is a graduate of the University of Malta. He was a member of the Commission to revise the Maltese rent laws and of the Commission to revise the Land Registration Act.

Mallia was the first judge to postpone his retirement by 3 years, after a Constitutional amendment allowed members of the judiciary to retire at age 68 instead of 65.

== See also ==
- Judiciary of Malta
