= Miriam Hayman =

Maltese judge

Miriam Hayman is a Maltese judge.

== Biography ==
Following graduation in law, in the early 1990s Hayman worked in the law firm of former Labour minister Joe Brincat.

She was appointed Magistrate by Prime Minister Alfred Sant in 1996-1998. As a Magistrate, she presided over drugs cases.

In 2001 she found sufficient prima facie evidence to prosecute former police commissioner George Grech for attempted rape, misuse of public funds, misuse of the telephone system, threat and blackmail. Grech attempted to discredit Hayman's credibility by claiming that her friendship with a Chinese woman had led to Hayman's decision to stop her attempted deportation.

In 2014, Hayman started hearing the case of Pasqualino Cefai without his defence lawyer being present. Mr Cefai responded with threats. He was later convicted to 30 months of prison.

Miriam Hayman was appointed Judge by Prime Minister Joseph Muscat in 2015. In her inaugural speech, Hayman called to improve working conditions for members of the judiciary, describing their 900€/month retirement pension as “pathetic and humiliating”. She also highlighted the lack of staff and proper training for judges, and lambasted legal aid lawyers for not showing up in court. She also called for strengthening the police drug team and for reforming the compulsory jail sentence for drug trafficking by sharing.

In 2021, Hayman presided the Constitutional case over the repeated bail refusals filed by Daphne Caruana Galizia murder suspect Yorgen Fenech.

In October 2024 Judge Hayman provisionally upheld a Nationalist Party request to stop PBS from broadcasting Budget ads which the PN insists are constitutionally illegal.

In 2026, Judge Hayman ruled that there had been no breach of human rights and no discrimination when doctors refused to intervene to terminate Andrea Prudente's pregnancy during a miscarriage in 2022, as her life had not been in "imminent danger". The judge also criticised pro-choice activists for having "used" Ms Prudente to advance broader legal arguments on abortion, also ordering her to bear the costs. The case was considered a test on Malta’s blanket abortion ban.
