= Natasha Galea Sciberras =

Maltese judge

Natasha Galea Sciberras (born 1976) is a Maltese judge. She was appointed magistrate in 2012, and judge in 2023.

In sentencing Lorin Scicluna in connection with the murder of Lassana Cisse, in November 2026, Galea Sciberras claimed she could not go beyond the request by the prosecution. This legal interpretation was contested by commentators, as contrary to the letter of Art.490(2) of the Criminal Code.

== See also ==
- Judiciary of Malta
