= Joseph Zammit McKeon =

Maltese judge

Joseph Zammit McKeon (born in Floriana, Malta, on 19 March 1956) is a former judge and Malta's Parliamentary Ombudsman.

== Biography ==
Judge Emeritus Joseph Zammit McKeon was conferred the Diploma of Notary Public on 12 December 1980 by the University of Malta followed by the Degree of Doctor of Laws on 30 January 1982. He practised primarily in litigation with effect from 4 March 1982.

Following the enactment of the Occupational Health and Safety (Promotion) Act 1994, he was appointed as the first President of the Commission for the Promotion of Occupational Health and Safety, a position which he held for six years until the Occupational Health and Safety Authority Act 2001 (which substituted the 1994 Act) came into force. He actively participated and addressed seminars and conferences in Malta and abroad on the subject. Until 2009, he was a lecturer and examiner in Occupational Health and Safety Legislation at the University of Malta in the Faculty of Laws and at the Centre for Labour Studies.

In 2001 he was appointed as the first Chairman of the Malta Transport Authority, a position which he held for a year.

In 2006 he was appointed as the first chairman of the Board of Appeal from Awards on Tenders by Local Councils, a position which he held until he was appointed Judge of the Superior Courts of Malta on 28 January 2009.

As a judge, he served in the First Hall Civil Court (including as a Court of Constitutional Jurisdiction), the Constitutional Court of Malta, the Court of Appeal (in its Superior Jurisdiction), the Court of Criminal Appeal (in its Superior Jurisdiction) and with effect from 9 April 2018, he was President of the Civil Court (Commercial Section) until he retired from the Bench on 19 March 2021 on reaching the retirement age of 65.

Following his retirement from the Bench and until his appointment as Ombudsman, he was Chairman of the Malta Maritime Forum. He chaired for a short time the Committee for Advocates and Legal Procurators as constituted by virtue of the Legal Profession (Reform) Act 2021. He was a member of the Malta Business Registry Advisory Board, and an Examiner of Corporate Re-Organisation and Liquidation at the Faculty of Laws of the University of Malta.

Judge Zammit McKeon was appointed Parliamentary Ombudsman of Malta with a unanimous resolution of Parliament on 6 March 2023 and sworn in on 8 March 2023.

== See also ==
Judiciary of Malta
