= Wenzu Mintoff =

Maltese judge and lawyer

Lawrence "Wenzu" Mintoff (born 11 December 1959 in Pietà, Malta) is a Maltese judge, lawyer and former politician.

== Biography ==
=== Legal and political career ===
A nephew to former Maltese Prime Minister Dom Mintoff, Lawrence "Wenzu" Mintoff became a lawyer in 1984. In the following years he worked at the Maltese mission in New York, at the Malta Development Corporation and at Malta Enterprise.

Mintoff represented the Malta Labour Party in Parliament from 1987 to 1992, also serving as Labour whip. In 1989 he left Labour and briefly joined the Alternattiva Demokratika.

According to Daphne Caruana Galizia, Wenzu Mintoff "had to be informed" of the photographs that Lorry Sant delivered in 1991 to the House Speaker to blackmail both him and Dom Mintoff (then a backbencher). Wenzu Mintoff returned to work as a Labour Party official after Lorry Sant's death in 1995.

Until the 2010s, Wenzu Mintoff was editor of the Labour Party's Sunday newspaper Kulhadd. In 2014, Wenzu Mintoff had a number of pending libel cases before the Courts.

Recently he had served as a senior legal officer on trade and foreign investment matters.

=== Member of the Judiciary ===
Appointment

Wenzu Mintoff was appointed Judge by Prime Minister Joseph Muscat in 2014.

During Mintoff's swear-in ceremony, Prime Minister Muscat celebrated his "unquestionable" integrity. Muscat also acknowledged criticism but expressed confidence that, like others before him, Wenzu Mintoff would rise about his political past and treat the cases he is assigned with integrity.

The appointment to the Bench of a former Member of Parliament was met with surprise and deemed inappropriate by several lawyers and by sections of the media. Some considered it as going "against the spirit of the judiciary reform."

Relevant cases

In May 2019 Wenzu Mintoff ruled in the landmark case of Anthony Debono v. L-Avukat General, which challenged the constitutionality of Maltese rent legislation. The court struck down as inconstitutional and in breach of the ECHR both Chapter 69 of the Laws of Malta and Act X of 2009 which safeguard all tenants in pre-June 1995 leases. The sentence, which opened up the liberalisation of the rental market, was deemed "shocking" by some for its potential effects on lessees.

In May 2020 Wenzu Mintoff ruled in a constitutional case that Yorgen Fenech's defence rights had been breached by COVID-19 restrictions and that the compilation of evidence against Fenech should resume, so as not to lengthen his pre-trial detention.

In July 2021, former MEP Marlene Mizzi was acquitted of insulting Wenzu Mintoff as the matter was time-barred.

In December 2021, in a case over old agricultural land leases, Judge Mintoff ruled against the landlords, stating that “the State has a very wide discretion to ensure that the agricultural sector does not collapse,” and dismissing as not "realistic" the expert valuation of agricultural land.

In June 2022, Judge Mintoff overturned in appeal the ruling on a libel case from Malta Today journalist Raphael Vassallo against activist Manuel Delia. In first instance, Magistrate Rachel Montebello had dismissed the case. In appeal, Judge Mintoff recognised the defamation and ordered Delia to pay moral damage and legal costs.

In June 2022, the Court of Appeal presided by Judge Mintoff annulled the agreement between Malta's Lands Authority and the Federation for Conservationists, Trappers and Hunters (FKNK) to manage the natural reserves in Magħtab and l-Aħrax. Mintoff ruled that the transfer of the sites through a private written agreement was against the law. Environmental NGOs called the ruling a "historic win" for nature and for the people of Malta.

In April 2024, during the trial for Daphne Caruana Galizia's murder, Judge Mintoff called out Muscat's chief of staff Keith Schembri for not discloding his "fraternal" friendship with Yorgen Fenech while sitting in sensitive briefings about the police investigation. “The court adds that it was inevitable that the appointment of a leading businessman in Malta as chief of staff at the Office of the Prime Minister, with all the entanglements and wide ranging contacts with the business world, would bring with it many situations of conflicting interests,” the judge stated.

Ruling in the Galdes et vs State Advocate et case, on 3 July 2024 the Civil Court (First Hall) in its Constitutional Jurisdiction, presided by Judge Mintoff, rejected requests of landlords to challenge long-term rental arrangements based on alleged disproportionate interference with their property rights.

In October 2024, Judge Mintoff reprimanded Magistrate Monica Vella for "irresponsible behaviour" causing unnecessary delay to proceedings. Mintoff addressed the communiqué to the Justice Minister, the Chief Justice and the Court Registrar.

On 12 August 2025, Judge Mintoff rejected the request of Papaya Limited to forbid the Times of Malta from publishing details of an FIAU Compliance Review, reaffirming the constitutional and European Convention principles upholding the press’s role as “public watchdog.”

In February 2026, in the context of negotiations on the nomination of a new Chief Justice, newspapers published a sworn letter by Wenzu Mintoff to the President, Prime Minister and Minister of Justice, in which he accused Prime Minister Robert Abela of bias against him. The letter raises several issues about communication between judges and top politicians on sensitive nominations, and about past improperties by Abela, whom judge Mintoff accuses of having threatened his court assistant, when the prime minister was a practising lawyer. The Chief Justice asked the new Commissioner for Standards of the Judiciary, Toni Abela, to investigate into Mintoff. Several stakeholders have deplored the politicisation of the Chief Justice appointment process.

Judge Mintoff is expected to retire at age 68 in December 2027.
