= Giannino Caruana Demajo =

Maltese judge

Giannino Caruana Demajo (born February 1958) is a retired Maltese judge.

== Biography ==
The son of Partit Nazzjonalista politician Tommy Caruana Demajo - a minister at the time of Malta's independence in 1964 - Giannino graduated in law (LL.D.) from the University of Malta in 1982.

He obtained a warrant to practise as advocate in the Superior Courts, exercising the profession in private practice until 1994.

Caruana Demajo was made lecturer in civil law at the University of Malta in 1989 and head of department of civil law in 1993. In 1992 - 1994 he also chaired the board of a commercial reinsurance company.

In 1997 - 1999 he served as Chair of the Committee of Experts on Efficiency of Justice of the Council of Europe, during which time he advised on the drafting of the Enforcement Code of Bosnia and Herzegovina, the Code of Procedure of Moldova and the Civil Code of Ukraine.

In December 1994 he was appointed Judge of the Superior Courts, sitting in the First Hall of the Civil Court, a first-instance court with jurisdiction also on human rights cases.

He is Senior Administrative Judge since 2007 and vice-chair of the Judicial Studies Board since 2009.

In 2010 he was deemed the favourite of Justice Minister Karmenu Mifsud Bonnici to succeed to Vincent A. De Gaetano as Chief Justice of Malta, but Prime Minister Lawrence Gonzi preferred to him the outsider Silvio Camilleri.

Since 2011 Caruana Demajo sits in the Constitutional Court.

He retired in February 2026, upon turning 68.

== See also ==
- Judiciary of Malta
