= Ian Spiteri Bailey =

Maltese judge

Ian Spiteri Bailey (born 1968) is a Maltese magistrate. He was appointed judge in 2023.

== See also ==
- Judiciary of Malta
