= Edwina Grima =

Maltese judge

Edwina Grima (born November 1969 in Malta) is a Maltese judge.

== Biography ==
Grima graduated as a lawyer in 1994 and practiced law since, specialising in civil and family cases. She chaired Malta's Small Claims Tribunal and the Social Security Appeals Board in 2002 - 2005. In January 2007 she was appointed a magistrate, and in 2019 a judge.

In October 2022, Grima presided the trial by jury of the Degiorgio brothers, who pleaded guilty and were condemned to 40 years as direct executors of the murder of Daphne Caruana Galizia.

After a series of leaks from the acts of the Yorgen Fenech trial despite a court decree prohibiting the publication of inadmissible evidence, in October 2024 Grima ordered a blanket bad on media debate on the Caruana Galizia murder and Fenech's involvement, stating that reporting should be limited to court proceedings, on penalty of being found in contempt of court. She stressed that "freedom of expression should not serve as a hindrance to the right to a fair trial"

In 2025, Grima presided the trial in the Vitals hospital concessions case and the trial of the "Maksar gang", which convicted the criminals that provided the equipment for the murder of Daphne Caruana Galizia.

In December 2025, Grima was considered a candidate to succeed Mark Chetcuti as Chief Justice of Malta, owing to her experience with "hard cases" and "strong character". Having been appointed magistrate under the Nationalist government and promoted to judge under Labour, she is seen as "no-nonsense" and respected for her "decisiveness and legal rigour".

In July-August 2026, Grima presided the two-months long jury trial of Yorgen Fenech.

== See also ==
- Judiciary of Malta
