= Joseph Azzopardi =

Chief Justice of Malta

Commissioner for Standards in Public Life
- Incumbent
- Assumed office 8 March 2023
- Prime Minister: Robert Abela
- Preceded by: George Marius Hyzler

Chief Justice of Malta
- In office 2018–2020
- Prime Minister: Joseph Muscat, Robert Abela
- Preceded by: Silvio Camilleri
- Succeeded by: Mark Chetcuti

Personal details
- Born: 8 April 1955 (age 71) Senglea
- Education: University of Malta

Joseph Azzopardi (born 8 April 1955 in Senglea) is Commissioner for Standards in Public Life in Malta. He was also Chief Justice of Malta from 2018 till 2020.

== Biography ==
Graduating as Notary Public from the University of Malta in 1978 and as Doctor of Laws in 1979, Azzopardi was the first president of the Federation of Maltese Youth Organizations in 1980.

Since 1980 Azzopardi practiced as a private lawyer for 23 years, specialising mainly in Civil Law and Matrimonial Law, and consulting for among others Lohombus Corporation and the Malta Public Transport Authority. He was appointed director of the then Mid Med Bank from 1981 to 1987, and was a member of the Housing Authority Board from 1997 to 2003. He also served as a Commissioner of Justice from 1997 to 2003 and was Chairman of various disciplinary Boards including those at Maltacom and the Malta Freeport Corporation. Azzopardi served as a member of the Committee of the Chamber of Advocates from 1996 to 2000 and was then elected its President until 2003. As such, he was ex officio member of the Commission for the Administration of Justice of Malta.

On 23 May 2003, Azzopardi was appointed by Prime Minister Eddie Fenech Adami (PN) as Judge of the Superior Courts. He presided the Family Section of the Civil Courts. In April 2018, at 63, Azzopardi was appointed by Prime Minister Joseph Muscat (PL) as Chief Justice of Malta. He was considered an uncontroversial choice. He retired at 65 on 8 April 2020.

Azzopardi has also served as examiner in Civil Law in the Faculty of Laws of the University of Malta. He also once unsuccessfully contested a single general election as a Labour candidate.

In June 2018, Justice Minister Owen Bonnici put forward again magistrate Consuelo Scerri Herrera for promotion to Judge, after Silvio Camilleri had been replaced by Azzopardi as Chief Justice. The Minister's decision was deemed by the Times of Malta to be putting the Judicial Appointment Committee "under intense pressure" and sources described it as "unethical" and a way for the government to test the new Chief Justice, sealing his public perception and the credibility of the appointment committee.

In October 2019, Azzopardi used the occasion of the annual speech to lash out against journalists for asking compromising questions, saying that "it is easy to attack members of the judiciary because you know they can’t answer you".

On 8 March 2023 Azzopardi was appointed Commissioner for Standards in Public Life, succeeding Dr George Marius Hyzler in this role.

He is married and has a daughter.

== See also ==
- List of chief justices of Malta
