= Bornstedt =

Bornstedt may refer to the following places in Germany:

- Bornstedt, Börde, a municipality in the Börde district, Saxony-Anhalt
- Bornstedt, Mansfeld-Südharz, a municipality in the Mansfeld-Südharz district, Saxony-Anhalt
- Bornstedt (Potsdam), a borough of Potsdam, Brandenburg
