= Democratic Alternative (Malta) =

Democratic Alternative Alternattiva Demokratika
- Abbreviation: AD
- Leader: Carmel Cacopardo
- Founded: 1989
- Dissolved: 17 October 2020
- Split from: Labour Party
- Merged into: AD+PD
- Headquarters: P.O. Box 38, Marsa MTP 1001
- Think tank: Fondazzjoni Ceratonia
- Youth wing: ADŻ Green Youth
- LGBT wing: AD LGBT
- Ideology: Green politics Pro-Europeanism; Progressivism; Factions: Eco-socialism
- Political position: Centre-left to left-wing
- European affiliation: European Green Party
- International affiliation: Global Greens
- Colours: Green and yellow

Website
- www.alternattiva.org.mt

Democratic Alternative (Maltese: Alternattiva Demokratika), sometimes referred to as AD – The Green Party, was a green political party in Malta. The party was initially founded by a coalition of former Labour Party members and environmental activists in 1989. On 1 August 2020 the party announced a plan to merge with the Democratic Party to form a new party called AD+PD. The merger was conducted on 17 October 2020.

== History ==
Alternattiva Demokratika was founded in 1989 when former Malta Labour Party President Toni Abela and former Labour MP and Parliamentary whip Wenzu Mintoff joined a number of environmental activists to form the new political party. Abela and Mintoff had resigned their posts in protest at the presence of certain elements in the Labour Party tainted with political violence and corruption. For this Abela and Mintoff were expelled from the Labour Party. Mintoff retained his seat in Parliament and, between 1989 and 1992 was effectively an MP for the new party as well as its first Chairperson.

Alternattiva Demokratika first stood for the 1992 national elections when it obtained 1.69% of first preference votes (their best result in a general election until 2013) and no seats. In the subsequent elections of 1996 and 1998 the Party's share of the vote declined. Following the 1998 result, Abela and Mintoff resigned and returned to the Labour Party (Abela was to be elected Labour's Deputy Leader in 2008).

Harry Vassallo replaced Mintoff as Chairperson of the Party in 1999. In 2003 the party campaigned for a Yes vote in the referendum on membership in the European Union. In the election that year the Party obtained only 0.7% of first preference votes having campaigned for second preference votes in order to secure the earlier referendum result and Malta's entry into the European Union. In 2004 the party obtained a remarkable result in the European Parliament election with 9.33% of first preference votes cast and the party's candidate, Arnold Cassola narrowly failing to be elected as MEP.

In the Maltese general election of 2008, the party increased its share of the vote to 1.31%. After ten years at the helm, Vassallo resigned as Chairperson and was replaced by Cassola. Barely a year later Cassola handed his resignation following the Party's poor showing at the European Parliament Election in June 2009. Cassola was replaced by Michael Briguglio in October 2009 but returned to the helm following Briguglio's resignation in 2013. Carmel Cacopardo was elected to lead in 2017.

In the general election of 2013, Alternattiva Demokratika obtained its best ever result with 5,506 votes (1.8%) in total across all districts where they ran candidates but failed to win a seat in parliament. The party's best result was in District 10 where then party leader Michael Briguglio received 741 first preference votes and a further 154 transfers before being eliminated after the 17th count. The quota for that district was 3,679 votes. After the election some Democratic Alternative supporters claimed this raised a number of issues regarding representation. Talks are expected to take place during a constitutional convention with regards to addressing anomalies with the current Maltese electoral system.

Alternattiva Demokratika entered into preliminary coalition negotiations with the Nationalist Party in April 2017 to determine if they could cooperate to unseat the Labour government. The talks broke down when AD's proposal of a coalition running under a separate name, 'Qawsalla' ("Rainbow"), with a new policy platform was rejected by the Nationalists, who were willing to form the coalition only if AD candidates ran under the Nationalist ticket.

== Media ==
In the 1990s, Alternattiva Demokratika had its own newspaper publication, Alternattiva, whose editor in chief from 1989 until 1991 was Harry Vassallo, and its own radio station, Capital Radio.

== Leaders ==
- Wenzu Mintoff 1989–1999
- Harry Vassallo 1999–2008
- Arnold Cassola 2008–2009
- Michael Briguglio 2009–2013
- Arnold Cassola 2013–2017
- Carmel Cacopardo 2017–2020

== Election results ==
=== House of Representatives ===
Election	Leader	Votes	%	Seats	+/–	Rank	Government
1992	Wenzu Mintoff	4,186	1.7	0 / 65	New	3rd	Extra-parliamentary
1996	Wenzu Mintoff	3,820	1.5	0 / 69	0	3rd	Extra-parliamentary
1998	Wenzu Mintoff	3,209	1.2	0 / 65	0	3rd	Extra-parliamentary
2003	Harry Vassallo	1,929	0.7	0 / 65	0	3rd	Extra-parliamentary
2008	Harry Vassallo	3,810	1.3	0 / 69	0	3rd	Extra-parliamentary
2013	Michael Briguglio	5,506	1.8	0 / 69	0	3rd	Extra-parliamentary
2017	Arnold Cassola	2,564	0.8	0 / 67	0	4th	Extra-parliamentary

=== European Parliament ===
Election	Leader	Votes	%	Seats	+/–	Rank	EP Group
2004	Harry Vassallo	22,938	9.33	0 / 5	New	3rd	–
2009	Arnold Cassola	5,802	2.34	0 / 5	0	3rd	–
2014	Arnold Cassola	7,418	2.95	0 / 6	0	3rd	–
2019	Carmel Cacopardo	1,866	0.72	0 / 6	0	5th	–

== See also ==
- Green party
- Green politics
- List of environmental organizations
