= Lorry Sant =

Maltese activist, trade unionist and politician

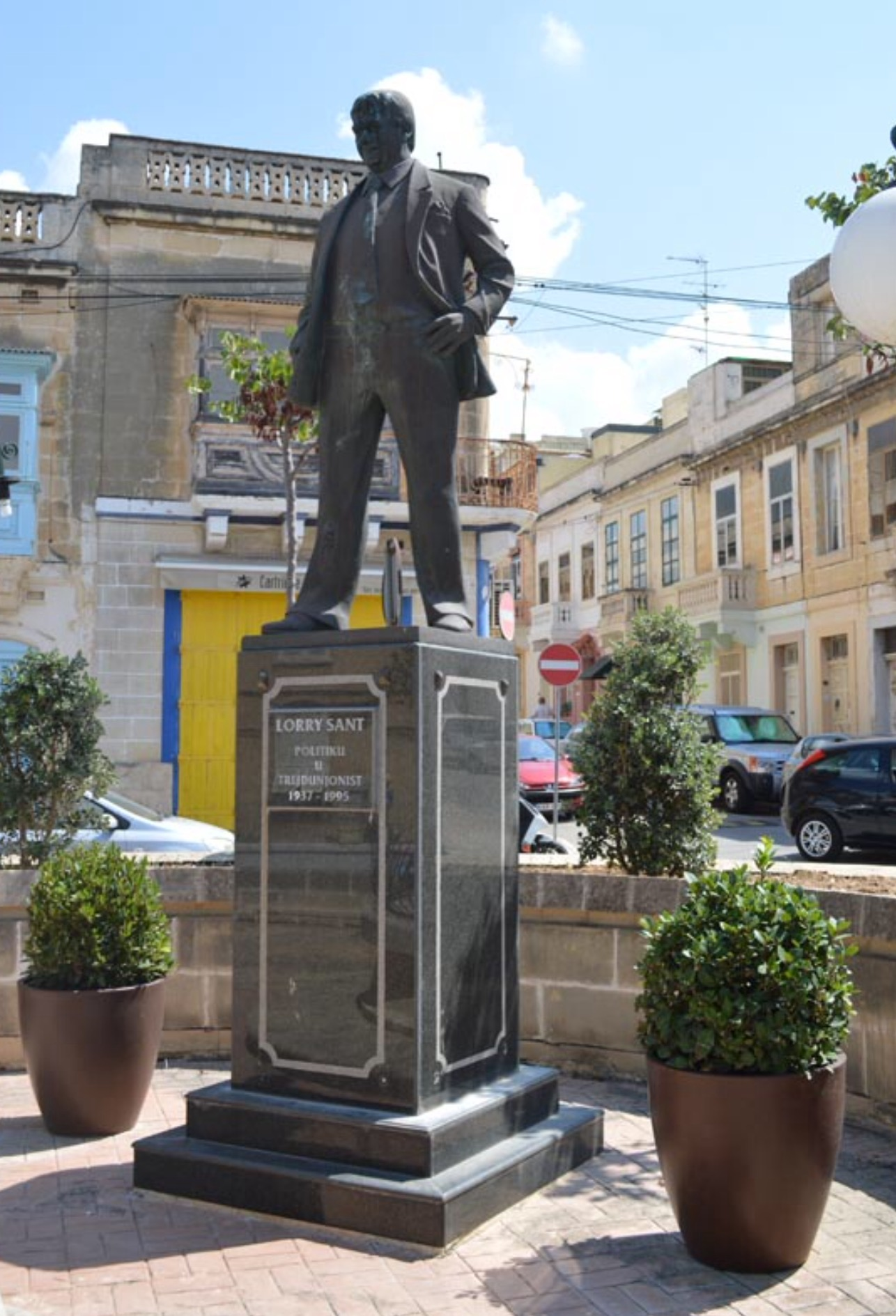
- Monument of Lorry Sant in Paola

Minister of Works, Sports and Housing
- In office 1983–1987
- Prime Minister: Dom Mintoff; Karmenu Mifsud Bonnici

Minister of the Interior
- In office 20 December 1981 – 3 September 1983
- Prime Minister: Dom Mintoff
- Preceded by: Dom Mintoff
- Succeeded by: Dom Mintoff

Minister of Works and Sports
- In office 1976–1981
- Prime Minister: Dom Mintoff

Minister of Works
- In office 1971–1976
- Prime Minister: Dom Mintoff

Personal details
- Born: 26 December 1937 Paola, Crown Colony of Malta
- Died: 5 October 1995 (aged 57)
- Party: Malta Labour Party
- Spouse: Carmen Sant née Pace
- Education: Technical Institute

Lorry Sant (26 December 1937 – 5 October 1995) was a Maltese activist, trade unionist and Malta Labour Party politician who held a number of ministerial offices between 1971 and 1987. Sant was a controversial figure who had an aggressive and abusive leadership approach. In the 1980s, he was involved in incidents of political violence, and he has been held responsible for violating the human rights of his employees.

== Early life and activism ==
Sant was born in Paola on 26 December 1937. He studied at the Technical Institute and then worked at the Malta Drydocks. He joined the Labour League of Youths (LLY), which was the youth wing of the Malta Labour Party (MLP), and became its secretary general.

In August 1959, he became the editor of the LLY's newspaper The Struggle. After he wrote an anti-clerical editorial which commented on a February 1960 pastoral letter by Archbishop Mikiel Gonzi, Sant was interdicted by the Catholic Church on 9 April 1960. The Struggle was discontinued after nine issues, and Sant continued to contribute in The Knight, which was a publication by the MLP.

Sant was also active in the General Workers' Union, and in May 1961 he became the secretary of the union's Metal Workers' Section.

He was married to Carmen Sant née Pace, who was also elected to parliament, as was his brother Salvu Sant.

== Political career ==
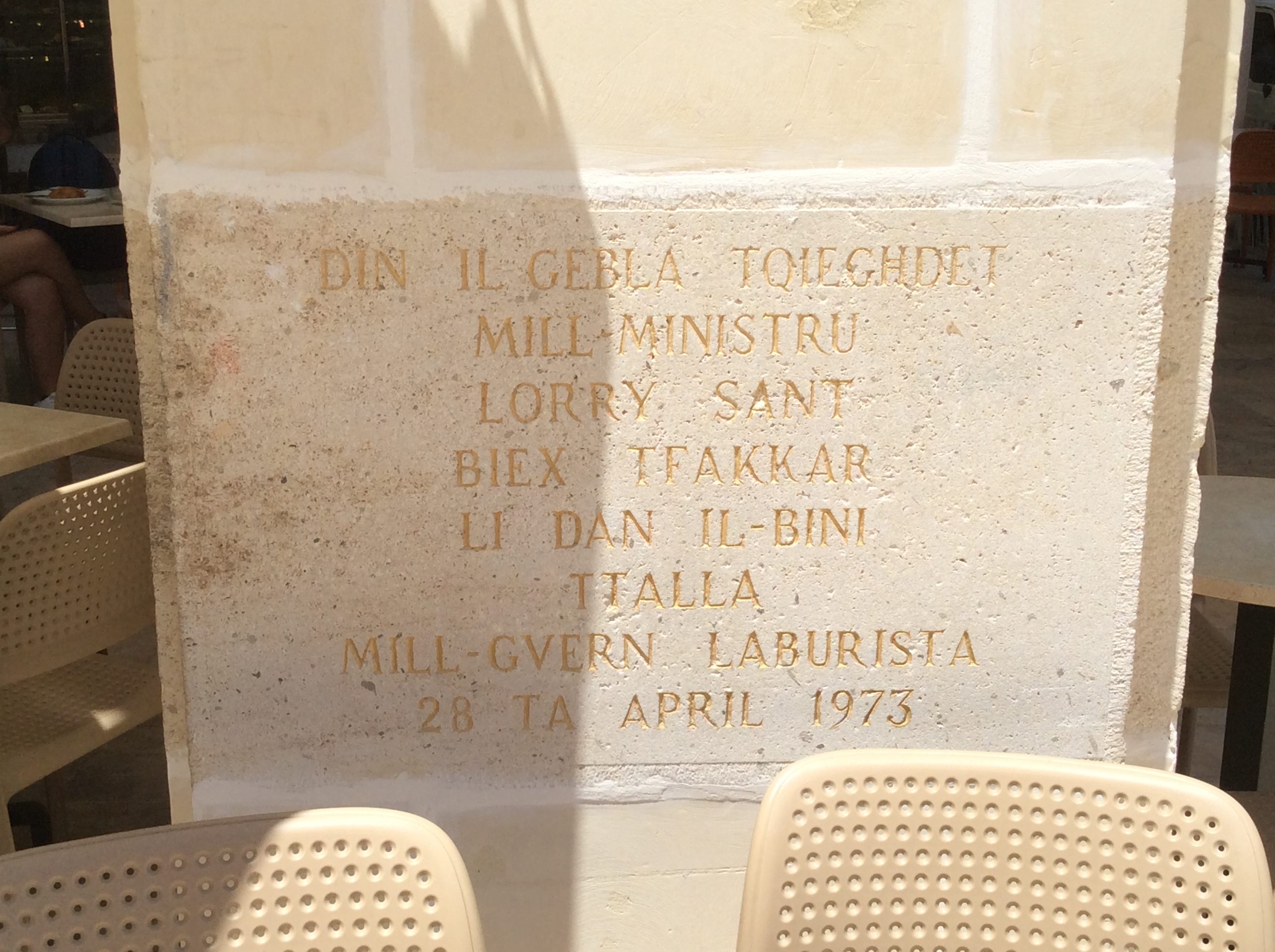
Commemorative Maltese inscription on a building in Valletta which translates to "This stone was laid down by the Minister Lorry Sant to commemorate that this building was built by the Labour government, 28 April 1973"

Lorry Sant was elected to Parliament for the first time in the general election of 1962. He was subsequently reelected in the next five elections, in 1966, 1971, 1976, 1981 and 1987. When the MLP was Malta's governing party between 1971 and 1987, Sant held a number of ministerial roles.

Sant was appointed as Minister of Works in 1971. The following year, he accompanied Prime Minister Dom Mintoff on a diplomatic visit to China. In 1976, Sant was appointed Minister of Works and Sports, and he later became the Minister of the Interior in 1981, and Minister of Works, Sports and Housing in 1983. He remained in office until the MLP was defeated in the elections of 1987.

Projects which Sant was involved in include the conversion of the former Sacra Infermeria into the Mediterranean Conference Centre, the construction of the National Stadium, Ta' Qali and the National Sports Pavilion at Kordin.

=== Controversies ===
Lorry Sant had a very rough leadership approach which resulted in a number of controversies including human rights violations. During his tenure as minister, Sant was hostile and aggressive to some of his employees, and in 2010 the courts found that he had breached the human rights of Renè Buttigieg who had worked as a government architect when Sant was works minister.

After the government took over the Marsa Sports Complex in 1971, Sant clashed with Hilary Tagliaferro, a Catholic priest who had established a youth sports centre within the complex. A dispute arose over the selection of football coaches, culminating in Tagliaferro being arrested for unauthorised possession of government stationery, although he was later released without any charges.

Sant also instigated a dispute with the Malta Football Association (MFA) because the association's president was a supporter of the Nationalist Party. The MFA had been allowed to use the national stadium at Ta' Qali after its completion, but in the early 1980s Sant prevented them from using it until they paid an annual rent of Lm 10,000. Sant also created another Football Association as a rival of the MFA.

Roads built during Sant's tenure as works minister were generally of inferior quality than roads which had been built earlier.

Lorry Sant had ambitions to succeed Dom Mintoff as leader of the Labour Party, but the two had a falling out and when Mintoff resigned as Labour leader and Prime Minister in 1984 he was succeeded by Karmenu Mifsud Bonnici. According to his wife Carmen, Lorry Sant "still loved Mintoff and he was hurt that [he] had turned against him."

Lorry Sant and his canvassers were responsible for various forms of political violence in the 1980s. On one occasion he reportedly broke the glasses of then-Nationalist MP Josie Muscat in parliament and then beat him up and locked him in a bathroom.

On 15 February 1982, Lino Cauchi who was the accountant of one of Sant's canvassers went missing. Three years later, on 15 November 1985, his remains were found in a well. Forensics tests later concluded that Cauchi was killed after receiving two blows to the sides of his head when still alive. The blows by a mallet that was also found in the well, fractured Cauchi's skull.

A court testimony later established that Cauchi attended at least two stormy meetings before the December election in 1981 where corrupt land deals were being discussed. When Cauchi disappeared two months later, he was in possession of potentially incriminating documents that were never found. While the murder has never been solved, Lorry Sant's canvassers are strongly suspected of orchestrating the murder, or potentially carrying out the murder themselves.

In 1986, Sant and Wistin Abela interrupted and almost assaulted Nationalist leader Eddie Fenech Adami in parliament while the latter was delivering a speech which condemned the murder of Raymond Caruana and the police's subsequent frameup of Peter Paul Busuttil.

== End of career and death ==
In 1989, Lorry Sant was charged with corruption in court, but the case was abandoned after magistrate Carol Peralta ruled that although there was enough evidence to issue a bill of indictment, the crimes were time-barred. After Labour whip Wenzu Mintoff (Dom Mintoff's nephew) wanted to expel him from the party, Lorry Sant produced an envelope containing a number of photos in parliament, apparently in an attempt to blackmail either Wenzu or Dom Mintoff. The photos were never revealed to the public. Due to friction within the MLP, the party administration suspended Sant from all party activities in 1990, and he therefore did not contest the general election of 1992. The MLP leader Alfred Sant reversed this suspension on 24 April 1995 due to Lorry Sant's deteriorating health at the time.

Sant died on 5 October 1995 at the age of 57.

== Legacy ==
A bronze statue of Lorry Sant was inaugurated in his hometown Paola on 10 February 2000. It stands within a garden which is also named after the politician.

Lorry Sant owned a villa in Marsaskala. His widow requested planning permission to demolish the building and replace it with six semi-detached villas in 2018.
