= Patrick P. Caruana =

United States Air Force general

Patrick Peter Caruana
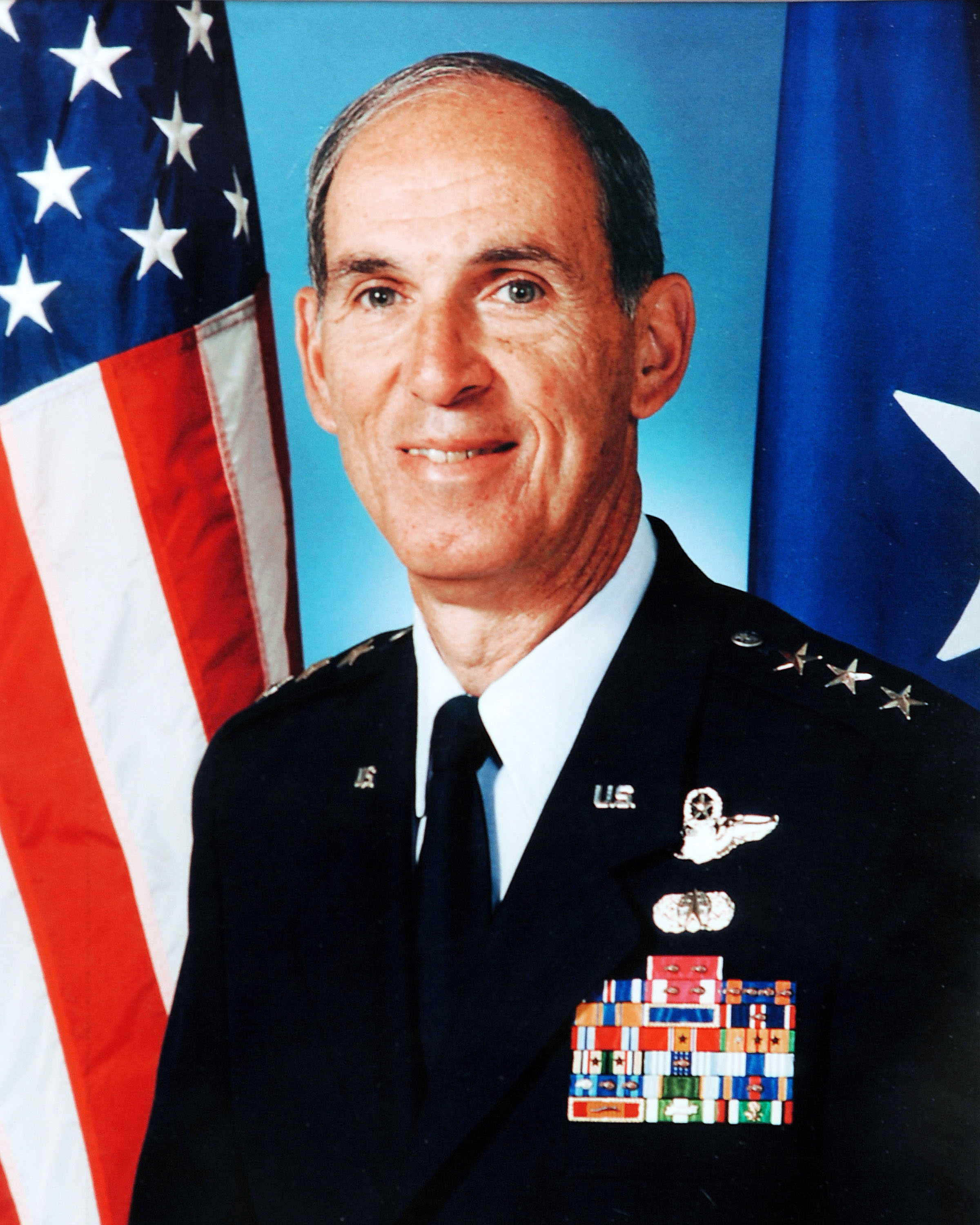
- Born: November 11, 1939 (age 86); St. Louis, Missouri, U.S.
- Military career
- Allegiance: United States of America
- Branch: United States Air Force
- Service years: 1957–1997
- Rank: Lieutenant general

Patrick Peter Caruana (born November 11, 1939) is a retired lieutenant general in the United States Air Force.

== Biography ==
Caruana was born in St. Louis, Missouri. He attended the U.S. Air Force Academy and Texas A&M University.

== Career ==
Caruana originally enlisted in the Air Force Reserve in 1957. He later received an appointment to the United States Air Force Academy, graduating in 1963.

From 1965 to 1969, he served in the 916th Air Refueling Squadron at Travis Air Force Base. In 1970, he was deployed with the 315th Tactical Airlift Wing to serve in the Vietnam War. After his service in the war, he joined the faculty of the Air Force Academy.

Caruana served with the 920th Air Refueling Squadron from 1977 until 1980, at which time he was given command of the 11th Air Refueling Squadron at Altus Air Force Base. After a tour of duty at Headquarters Strategic Air Command, he was assigned to the 376th Strategic Wing at Kadena Air Base in Japan. In 1985, he assumed command of the 376th. After Caruana's return to the United States, he assumed command of the 384th Air Refueling Wing and the 42nd Air Division. He would serve in the Gulf War before re-assuming command of the 42nd, in 1991.

Later that year, he returned to Headquarters Strategic Air command as Deputy Chief of Staff, Operations. The following year, he was assigned to the Office of the Assistant Secretary of the Air Force (Acquisition). In 1993, he was assigned command of the 14th Air Force at Vandenberg Air Force Base before becoming vice commander of Air Force Space Command in 1994. He retired in 1997.

Awards he received include the Legion of Merit with two oak leaf clusters, the Distinguished Flying Cross, the Meritorious Service Medal with two oak leaf clusters, the Air Force Commendation Medal, the Presidential Unit Citation, the Outstanding Unit Award with oak leaf cluster, the National Defense Service Medal with oak leaf cluster, the Vietnam Service Medal with silver oak leaf cluster and two bronze oak leaf clusters, the Southwest Asia Service Medal with two oak leaf clusters, the Vietnam Gallantry Cross, the Vietnam Campaign Medal and the Kuwait Liberation Medal (Saudi Arabia).
