= Joe Brincat =

Joe Brincat may refer to:

- Joe Brincat (footballer)
- Joe Brincat (politician)
