= Neville Camilleri =

Maltese judge

Neville Camilleri (Born 1974) is a Maltese judge. He was appointed magistrate in 2011 and judge in 2021.

== See also ==
- Judiciary of Malta
