= Oana Caruana Pulpan =

Maltese chess player (born 1978)

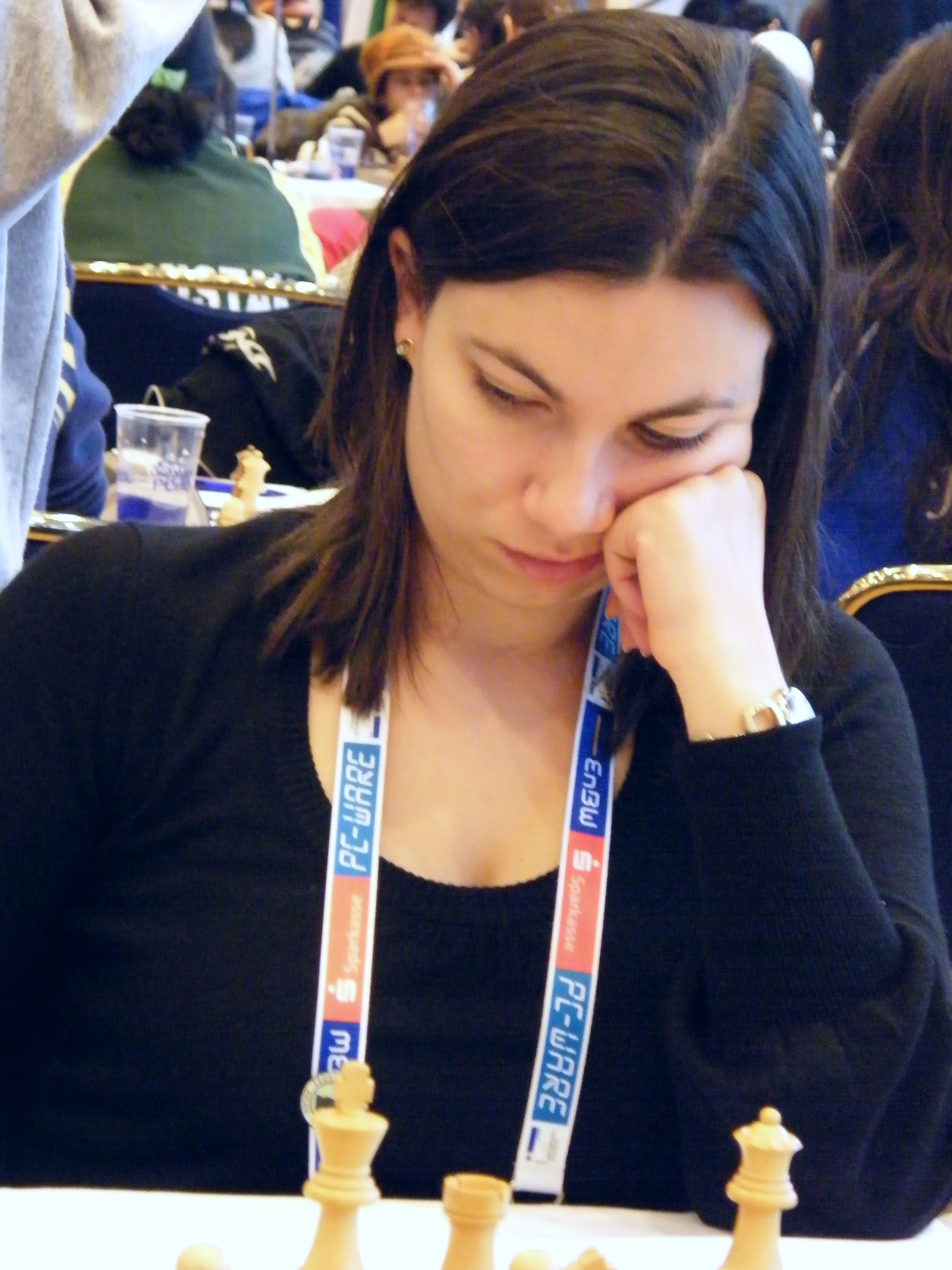
- Pulpan playing chess

Personal information
- Born: April 17, 1978 (age 48)

Chess career
- Country: Malta
- Title: Woman FIDE Master (2009)
- Peak rating: 1941 (March 2024)

Oana Caruana Pulpan (born 17 April 1978) is a Maltese chess player. She was awarded the Woman FIDE Master title in 2009. She is a member of the Maltese Women's National Team. Her father introduced her to chess when she was very young and has been playing it since.

She is sponsored by the company she works with, Actavis. She is also a pharmacologist. She teaches chess classes at St. Catherine's High School in Pembroke, Malta.
