= Silvio Camilleri =

Chief Justice of Malta

Chief Justice of Malta
- In office 2010–2018
- Prime Minister: Lawrence Gonzi, Joseph Muscat
- Preceded by: Vincent A. De Gaetano
- Succeeded by: Joseph Azzopardi

Personal details
- Born: 26 April 1953 (age 73) Zabbar
- Education: University of Malta

Silvio Camilleri (born 26 April 1953 in Zabbar) is a Maltese judge, Chief Justice of Malta from 2010 to 2018.

== Biography ==
Camilleri graduated as Doctor of Laws in 1975 and joined the Bar in 1976. In 1980 he joined the public service as senior counsel and later public prosecutor in the criminal courts. He was appointed Assistant to the Attorney General in 1989 and Attorney General in 2004.

Dr Silvio Camilleri, Malta's 22nd Chief Justice, graduated as doctor of laws in 1975 and was called to the bar in 1976. After four years in private practice, he joined the public service as senior counsel (1980) and eventually assumed the duties of public prosecutor in the criminal courts. He was appointed Assistant to the Attorney General in 1989 and Attorney General in 2004 by Prime Minister Lawrence Gonzi. As Attorney General he also chaired the Financial Intelligence Analyses Unit. He was chairman of the Council of Europe's Committee on the Development of Human Rights and the Committee on Evaluation of Anti-Money Laundering Measures.

Camilleri was appointed Chief Justice of Malta in 2010 by Prime Minister Lawrence Gonzi after his predecessor Vincent A. De Gaetano was nominated to the European Court of Human Rights. He was deemed an outsider, not having been previously a member of the judiciary of Malta.

In 2014 Camilleri was candidate as second judge from Malta to the General Court of the European Union. He did not pass the suitability exam by a panel of EU judges as regards his knowledge and experience on EU law.

Camilleri is also a senior lecturer and head of the Department of Criminal Law at the University of Malta. He was made member of the National Order of Merit in 1998.

== See also ==
- List of chief justices of Malta
