= L-Orizzont =

National daily newspaper in Malta

- Type: Daily
- Owner(s): Union Print Co. (General Workers' Union)
- Founder: Anton Cassar
- Editor: Victor Vella
- Founded: 1962
- Political alignment: Labour Party
- Language: Maltese
- Country: Malta
- Sister newspapers: It-Torċa
- OCLC number: 313156459
- Website: Talk.mt/

L-Orizzont (lit. "The Horizon") is a national daily newspaper in Malta published by Union Print Co., the media arm of the General Workers' Union. The newspaper was founded in 1962 by Anton Cassar, who also served as the paper's first editor.
