= Mark Chetcuti =

Chief Justice of Malta

Chief Justice of Malta
- Incumbent
- Assumed office 2020
- Prime Minister: Joseph Muscat, Robert Abela
- Preceded by: Joseph Azzopardi

Personal details
- Born: 4 February 1958 (age 68) Pietà
- Education: University of Malta

Mark Chetcuti (born 4 February 1958 in Sliema) is a Maltese judge, serving as Chief Justice of Malta from 2020 till retirement in early 2026.

== Biography ==
Mark Chetcuti obtained an LL.D. in Law from the University of Malta in 1981, after which he started private practice, specialising in civil law, family law and arbitrations. He got accreditation by the Malta Arbitration Centre, chaired the Appeals Tribunal for Controlled Companies, and was a member of the Refugee Appeals Board.

After 30 years of practice, in 2010 Chetcuti was appointed directly to the office of Judge by Prime Minister Lawrence Gonzi's cabinet. Chetcuti was tasked with general civil law cases and constitutional first instance cases, including exclusive remit on intellectual property, trademarks and maritime law cases. He also presided competition law cases and the Patents Court.

In 2020 the Parliament of Malta unanimously appointed Chetcuti as Chief Justice, replacing Joseph Azzopardi upon his retirement. He took over in the midst of the political crisis following Yorgen Fenech's arrest as alleged mastermind of Daphne Caruana Galizia's assassination, and related court cases, as well as a major police scandal and a fatal building collapse in Hamrun. As Chief Justice, Chetcuti presided the Constitutional Court, the Superior Court of Appeal in Civil and Commercial matters and the Superior Criminal Court of Appeal. He also serves as Vice-President of the Commission for the Administration of Justice of Malta andits Judicial Appointments Committee.

During his tenure, Chief Justice Chetcuti repeated his calls for the government to address under-staffing and under-resourcing of the judiciary, as essential to tackle the backlog of cases. In 2024 he called for more specialised court staff, additional courtrooms for criminal hearings, and a dedicated building for inquiring magistrates.

He is set to retire in February 2026, upon turning 68.

== See also ==
- Judiciary of Malta
