= Commission for the Administration of Justice of Malta =

National council of the judiciary of Malta

- Il-Kummissjoni għall-Amministrazzjoni tal-Ġustizzja

Agency overview
- Formed: 1994
- Jurisdiction: Malta
- Headquarters: Grandmaster's Palace, Valletta, Malta
- Agency executive: President of Malta, Chairman
- Parent agency: Judiciary of Malta

The Commission for the Administration of Justice (Maltese: Il-Kummissjoni għall-Amministrazzjoni tal-Ġustizzja) is Malta's national council of the judiciary, responsible for the self‑government and oversight of the judiciary.

It is established under Article 101A of the Constitution of Malta and is tasked with supervising the efficiency and proper functioning of the Courts, advising on the administration of justice, overseeing disciplinary matters concerning judicial officers, and formulating ethical codes for judges, magistrates, and legal practitioners.

The Commission is chaired by the President of Malta and comprises judicial and non‑judicial members representing various branches of the legal system.

As self‑government body of the judiciary in Malta, the Commission plays a central role in balancing judicial independence with accountability. It is a full Member of the European Network of Councils for the Judiciary (ENCJ).

The Commission is located in the Grandmaster's Palace, Valletta.

== History ==
The Commission was established in 1994 with the introduction of Article 101A into the Maltese Constitution, intended to provide a structured mechanism for judicial self‑government and to enhance the independence and accountability of the judiciary. The constitutional provision has since been amended, including in 2016 to refine its composition and functions.

== Composition ==
The Commission consists of the following members:

- The President of the Republic serving as Chairman;
- The Chief Justice of Malta as Deputy Chairman;
- Two judges elected by the judges of the Superior Courts for four‑year terms;
- Two magistrates elected by the magistrates of the Inferior Courts for four‑year terms;
- One member appointed by the Prime Minister of Malta for four years;
- One member appointed by the Leader of the Opposition of Malta for four years; and
- The President of the Chamber of Advocates, serving ex officio.

The persons appointed by the Prime Minister and the Leader of the Opposition must be at least forty‑five years of age and be individuals of integrity and public respect.

=== Current members ===
As provided by the official Judiciary Malta description of the Commission and supported by independent sources, the Commission for the Administration of Justice of Malta comprises the Chairman and other members holding offices or appointments under Article 101A of the Constitution.

Office	Officeholder	Source
President of Malta (Chairman)	Myriam Spiteri Debono	ex officio
Chief Justice of Malta (Deputy Chairman)	Mark Chetcuti	ex officio
Judges' representatives (two, elected)	Neville Camilleri +1	
Magistrates' representatives (two, elected)	Not publicly listed	
Government's representative	Paul Lia	
Opposition's representative	Vince Galea	
President of the Chamber of Advocates	Louis Degabriele	ex officio
Secretary (administrative)	Deborah Farrugia	

== Functions ==
Under Article 101A of the Constitution and relevant legislation, the Commission has the following functions:

- Supervision of litigation — overseeing the workings of all Superior and Inferior Courts and recommending remedies to the Minister responsible for justice for the efficient functioning of these courts.
- Administration of justice — advising the Minister on matters relating to the organisation and administration of justice.
- Discipline of judicial officers — exercising discipline over judges and magistrates in accordance with the Constitution and disciplinary provisions. The Commission also has the authority to exercise discipline, according to law, over advocates and legal procurators.
- Codes of ethics — drawing up codes of ethics regulating the conduct of members of the judiciary and, after consultation with the Committee for Advocates and Legal Procurators, codes governing the professional conduct of advocates and legal procurators.
- Judicial performance feedback — drawing attention to any matter involving judges or magistrates that may not be conducive to the efficient and proper functioning of courts.
- Reports — submitting annual and special reports on its activities to the Minister responsible for justice.

The procedures of the Commission are regulated by the Commission for the Administration of Justice Act (Chapter 369 of the Laws of Malta).

All Commission proceedings, including deliberations and evidence, are held in camera and are confidential. Each member is required to act independently and without direction from external authorities.

== Subcommittees ==
The Commission oversees several statutory subcommittees with specific mandates.

=== Judicial Appointments Committee ===
Established under Article 96A of the Constitution, this Committee is responsible for selecting and recommending candidates for appointment as judges and magistrates. It includes the Chief Justice, members elected from among judges and magistrates, the Auditor General, the Ombudsman, and the President of the Chamber of Advocates. (see Judiciary of Malta#Appointment)

=== Committee for Judges and Magistrates ===
Established under Article 101B of the Constitution, this committee handles disciplinary proceedings against judges and magistrates conducted independently of the full Commission. (see Judiciary of Malta#Discipline)

=== Committee for Advocates and Legal Procurators ===
Established by the Commission for the Administration of Justice Act (Chapter 369 of the Laws of Malta), this committee investigates complaints about the conduct of advocates and legal procurators and may impose disciplinary penalties.

Proceedings are held in camera and decisions are not published, thus hindering transparency. A case reported in the press in 2010 concerned then-lawyer Nadine Lia, later appointed as Magistrate, about altercations in court with opposing lawyers, a conduct that the presiding judge had described as “shameful” and “appalling.” In 2023, some 100 complaints against lawyers had been received, a figure which the president of the Chamber of Advocates described as "very big".

== Reports and Accountability ==
The Commission is required to prepare an annual report on its activities, which it submits to the Minister responsible for justice. This report may include observations on court efficiency, disciplinary matters, ethical guidelines, and recommendations for systemic improvements.

== See also ==
- Judiciary of Malta
- Judicial independence
- Judicial accountability
- Judicial accountability in Malta
