= Judiciary of Malta =

The judiciary of Malta (Maltese: Il-Ġudikatura ta’ Malta) is the branch of the Republic of Malta responsible for the administration of justice. It is established by the Constitution of Malta and operates independently of the executive (the Cabinet) and legislative (the Parliament) branches of government.

The judiciary of Malta is composed of the Chief Justice, judges and magistrates.

The judiciary interprets and applies impartially the laws of Malta in civil, criminal, constitutional, and administrative matters, and ensures the protection of fundamental rights and freedoms.

== Constitutional basis ==
The judiciary is established under Chapter VIII of the Constitution of Malta, which regulates the appointment, tenure, and removal of judges and magistrates, as well as the organisation of courts. Judicial independence is expressly guaranteed by the Constitution, and members of the judiciary are subject only to the Constitution and the law in the exercise of their functions. The Constitution provides for a system of Courts, including both superior and inferior ones.

95. (1) There shall be in and for Malta such Superior Courts having such powers and jurisdiction as may be provided by any law for the time being in force in Malta. (Constitution of Malta)

== Superior courts ==
Superior courts are presided over by judges and include:

- Constitutional Court of Malta – the highest court in Malta, with original and appellate jurisdiction in constitutional matters, including human rights cases, electoral disputes, and constitutional interpretation;
- Court of Appeal – hears appeals from decisions of courts of first instance in civil and administrative matters;
- Court of Criminal Appeal – hears appeals from criminal judgments;
- Criminal Court – a court of first instance for serious criminal offences (typically the presiding judge sits with a jury of nine);
- Civil Court – a court of first instance for civil matters, organised into specialised sections, including family law, commercial law, and asset recovery.

The Court of Appeal and the Court of Criminal Appeal hear appeals from decisions of the civil and criminal cases delivered by the superior and inferior courts respectively. Inferior courts are presided over by magistrates with original jurisdiction in criminal and civil actions.

Prosecution tasks in Malta are shared between the Malta Police Force, who investigate crimes and presses charges, and the Attorney General, who prosecutes the cases. Magistrates may also start ‘inquests’ (magisterial inquiries), originally foreseen to preserve evidence, but today rather fully-fledged investigations.

The highest court, the Constitutional Court of Malta, has both original and appellate jurisdiction. In its appellate jurisdiction it adjudicates cases involving violations of human rights and interpretation of the Constitution. It can also perform judicial review. In its original jurisdiction it has jurisdiction over disputed parliamentary elections and electoral corruption practices. The Constitutional Court's judgments do not have explicit erga omnes effect, and norms which have been found unconstitutional need to be repealed by Parliament. The Court is thus faced with repetitive cases due to its jurisprudence not being taken into account by the administration or even by other judges.

The Venice Commission notes that “the Constitution should be amended to provide that judgments of the Constitutional Court finding a legal provision unconstitutional will result directly in the annulment of that provision without intervention by Parliament” (#78)

== Inferior courts ==
Inferior courts are presided over by magistrates and include:

- Court of Magistrates (Malta) – exercises jurisdiction in minor criminal and civil matters;
- Court of Magistrates (Gozo) – exercises both inferior and, in certain cases, superior jurisdiction within Gozo.

== Administrative tribunals ==
In addition to the ordinary courts, Malta has a number of adjudicatory bodies, variously mentioned as "administrative tribunals" or "specialised tribunals", dealing with various areas of administrative law, such as employment, immigration, competition, and social security. They are typically competent to hear appeals from decisions of administrative authorities. Many of these tribunals are appointed through a procedure involving the executive power, with Chair and members of the tribunals appointed from among lawyers upon proposal of the Cabinet or of the competent Minister. Some tribunals' decisions can be appealed on substance, and others only on point of law - usually to the Court of Appeal. Some administrative tribunals do not have further judicial review avenues, such as the Immigration Appeals Board; their decisions are final and cannot be appealed further, if not at constitutional level for breach of human rights.

The Venice Commission flagged already in 2018 that specialised tribunals do not enjoy the same level of judicial independence as the ordinary judiciary, which risks being undermined by their expansion, with the danger of parallel jurisdictions.

== Members of the Judiciary ==
The Judiciary includes the Chief Justice, the judges of the superior courts, and the magistrates of the inferior courts.

The self-government of the judiciary is entrusted to the Commission for the Administration of Justice of Malta

The judges are styled as "The Honourable Mister/Madam Justice"; only the Chief Justice and President of the Court of Appeal are styled as "His/Her Honour".

=== Security of tenure ===
Judges and magistrates have security of tenure until the mandatory retiring age of 65 (or 68 if they wish to extend). They may be removed from office only in accordance with constitutional procedures. By Constitution, their salaries are paid from the Consolidated Fund and the government cannot lower them to their prejudice.

=== Appointment ===
The appointment the Chief Justice is made by the President of Malta following a two-thirds resolution by the House of Representatives of Malta.

Until 2016, judges and magistrates were chosen by the Prime Minister in full discretion. Since 2020, a Judicial Appointments Committee (a subcommittee of the Commission for the Administration of Justice) composed of 5 non-judicial members recommends appointments of judges of the superior court and magistrates of the inferior court directly to the President of Malta.

Judges are typically appointed from among advocates with at least twelve years of professional legal experience, while magistrates generally require a minimum of seven years’ experience.

=== Training ===
Judicial training and continuing professional development are coordinated by the Judicial Studies Committee, which provides induction training for newly appointed judicial officers and facilitates participation in European and international judicial training programmes.

=== Ethics ===
Judges and magistrates are bound by a Code of Ethics requiring independence, impartiality, integrity, and propriety. Judicial officers must avoid conflicts of interest and refrain from any conduct that may undermine public confidence in the judiciary.

=== Discipline ===
To ensure accountability while guaranteeing judicial independence, judges and magistrates may be subject to disciplinary measures (warning, fines, suspensions) from their own peers if they breach the Code of Ethics. Disciplinary accountability is distinct from criminal liability, although serious misconduct may give rise to both.

Based on Article 101B of the Constitution (introduced in 2016), written complaints may be submitted by the Chief Justice of Malta, or by the Minister responsible for Justice. Complaints are examined by a Committee for Judges and Magistrates, composed of three members of the judiciary who are not members of the Commission for the Administration of Justice. If the Committee determines that there is a prima facie case, disciplinary proceedings are opened. These take place generally in camera (in private). The concerned member of judiciary has the right to be informed of the allegations, to be heard, to be represented by legal counsel, and to present evidence and submissions. If misconduct is proven, sanctions may include a reprimand, a financial penalty, or suspension from office (with loss of salary). Decisions of the Committee may be appealed before the Constitutional Court.

In cases of serious misconduct or incapacity, the Commission for the Administration of Justice may recommend removal from office, which requires a resolution of the House of Representatives supported by a two-thirds majority.

==== Commissioner for Standards of the Judiciary ====
In 2025, the Parliament of Malta, by simple majority, introduced in the Constitution the office of Commissioner for Standards of the Judiciary, intended to provide a structured disciplinary oversight mechanism and allow members of the public to submit complaints about judicial misconduct, with the aim of strengthening ethical standards and accountability in the judiciary. The first Commissioner, retired Judge Toni Abela, was sworn in December 2025.

== Court experts ==
Court experts in Malta are appointed to assist the judiciary in determining technical, scientific or professional matters arising during judicial proceedings.. Experts may be appointed to investigate matters such as property disputes, medical issues, financial transactions and forensic evidence, and are generally required to explain the basis of their findings in reports that may be examined by the parties. The court is not bound to adopt an expert's conclusions.

The appointment and supervision of court experts have been subject of controversy. In 2014 and 2016, lawyers expressed concerns about the lack of a transparent, centralised register of experts, the repeated appointment of certain individuals, the professional qualifications and impartiality of court experts, and limited public information about appointments and remuneration. Further criticism has concerned delays in submitting expert reports, the cost of specialist evidence and the limited mechanisms available to monitor experts' performance. These issues have prompted calls for reform of the appointment system and greater accountability.

Controversy intensified during the magisterial inquiry into the Vitals Global Healthcare hospitals concession, where the fees, qualifications, independence and findings of foreign forensic experts were challenged by political figures and defence lawyers. The inquiry also generated debate about the substantial fees paid to foreign specialists and the evidential consequences of experts' refusal to return to Malta to testify. The disputes highlighted broader questions about the transparency of expert appointments, the terms of their engagement, the admissibility and testing of expert evidence, and the balance between specialist assistance and judicial oversight.

In April 2016, the Court of Appeal ordered the removal from a civil case of an expert report submitted by Martin Bajada, after the defence raised that the expert had been convicted of theft and fraud by a British court in 1993. Bajada had been frequently appointed as IT and mobile-phone court expert, ratcheting some €496,479 in fees between 2010 and 2015. Malta's Chamber of Advocates reiterated their calls to reform the system to appoint court experts, with clearer criteria for professional qualifications, criminal-record checks, conflict-of-interest declarations and greater transparency in remuneration. In response, the Justice Ministry initiated a due-diligence process requiring experts to submit information about their qualifications, criminal records and potential conflicts of interest. During the investigation into the 2017 assassination of journalist Daphne Caruana Galizia, Yorgen Fenech's the defence challenged Bajada's continued appointment on human rights and impartiality grounds. In January 2019, however, the court rejected a constitutional application seeking to prevent him from continuing his work on the investigation. Earlier appellate judgments had also distinguished between expert tasks involving subjective assessments and those concerned with objectively verifiable technical information, such as telephone call records.
