= 2019–2020 Maltese protests =

2019 protest movement started in Malta

- Part of the 2019 Malta political crisis and Protests against democratic backsliding
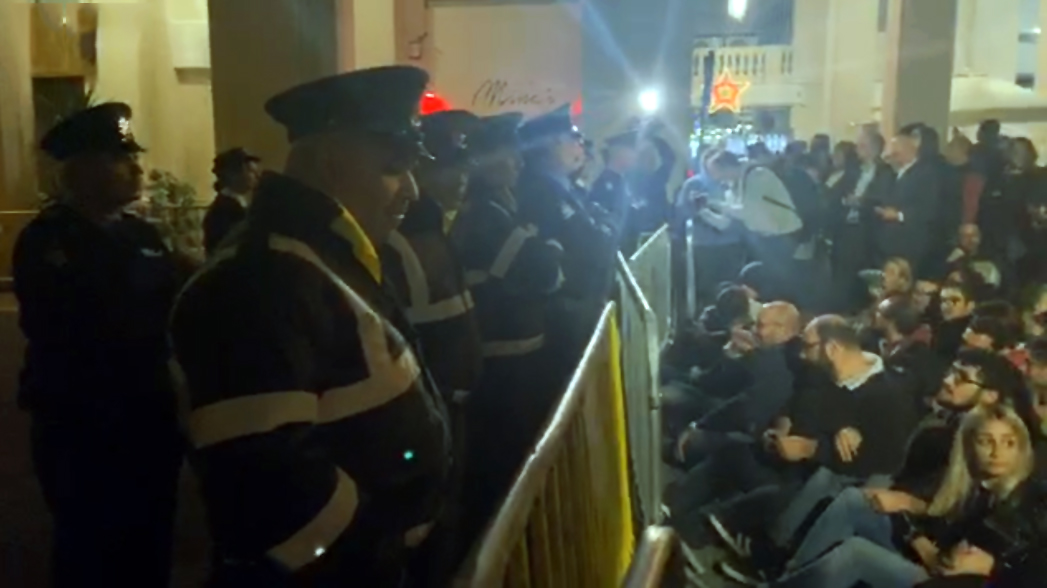
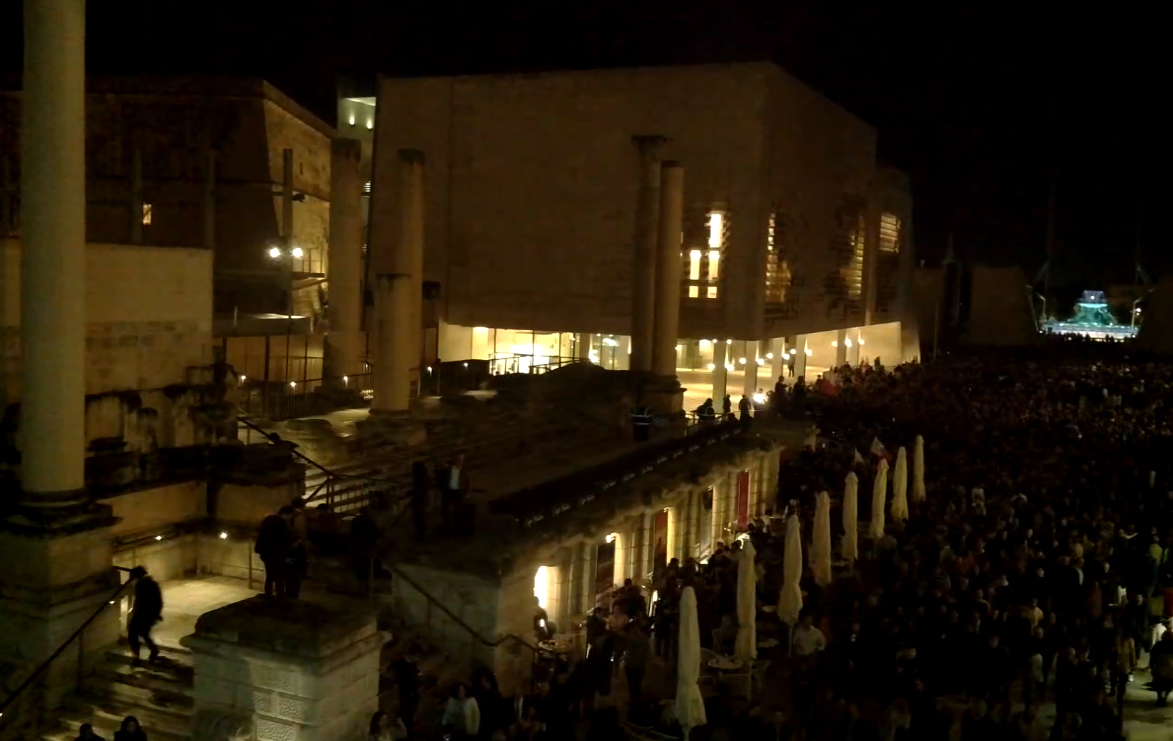
- Protests in front of the Parliament House, Valletta
- Date: 20 November 2019 – 11 January 2020
- Location: Malta Other countries: United Kingdom; Belgium; Spain; Netherlands; Germany
- Caused by: Business and alleged political involvement in the plot to assassinate journalist Daphne Caruana Galizia; Governmental corruption; Governmental influence on judiciary; Governmental influence on criminal investigations; Maladministration
- Methods: Protests, demonstrations, sit-ins, civil disobedience, online activism
- Result: Resignation of Prime Minister Joseph Muscat, Minister Konrad Mizzi, and Prime Minister's Chief of Staff Keith Schembri

Parties
(Malta) Protesters: NGOs; (Malta) Maltese opposition: Nationalist Party; Democratic Party; Democratic Alternative	Government of Malta: Malta Police Force; Labour Party

Lead figures
Repubblika (NGO); Occupy Justice (Women Led Protest Group); Manuel Delia (Blogger and activist); Moviment Graffitti (NGO)	Robert Abela (from 13 January 2020) (Prime Minister of Malta) Joseph Muscat (until 13 January 2020) (Prime Minister of Malta)

Casualties
- Injuries: 2 policemen sustained minor injuries

The 2019–2020 Maltese protests started in Valletta and other urban centres of Malta on 20 November 2019, mainly calling for resignations after alleged political links to the assassination of journalist and blogger Daphne Caruana Galizia surfaced following the arrest of businessman Yorgen Fenech. The protesters also targeted government corruption and the lack of action on money laundering. The protests were unprecedented in Malta's political history since its independence from the United Kingdom.

As of December 2019, the Maltese government was accused of using intimidation tactics against protesters and journalists. Caruana Galizia's family accused Muscat of trying to shield members of the inner circle from the investigations.

On 1 December 2019, Prime Minister Joseph Muscat announced that he would resign on 12 January 2020. Constitutional experts, legal bodies, and other representatives stated that Muscat's decision to remain in office until January 2020 and to have a more than six-week Parliamentary recess over Christmas led to the crisis within Maltese institutions. The Caruana Galizia family, political parties, the European Union mission in Malta, academics, NGOs, industrial organisations, and organised business and labour unions called for his immediate resignation. On 13 January 2020, Joseph Muscat resigned, satisfying one of the protestors' main demands.

== Background ==
=== Malta's political context ===
Malta, an island nation of nearly 500,000 citizens, gained its independence from Great Britain in 1964, and its people subsequently declared it a Republic in 1974. It has largely been viewed as a nation of general geopolitical neutrality (since 1979), but also of extraordinarily impressive democratic voter participation. Its modern governmental body - a unicameral chamber known as the House of Representatives - was predominated by a two-party system, of which the Labour Party, led by Prime Minister Joseph Muscat, holds the majority of seats.

Despite several markers of socioeconomic success, such as its high life expectancy of 81 and its classification as an advanced society according to the IMF and UN (along with 32 other nations worldwide), public perception of Malta's public servants has been marred by allegations of corruption. This has resulted in a worse Corruption Perceptions Index compared to several other similar small economically advanced nations like Denmark, Singapore, Luxembourg, New Zealand, and Hong Kong. In recent years, investigative journalists have increasingly reported on allegations of money laundering, tax evasion via offshore havens (including those connected with the Panama Papers), nepotism, and various other indications of bribery and fraud; journalists are protected pursuant to Malta's Constitutional law on free press and free speech.

Leaders of both parties, including Muscat and the opposition party's Adrian Delia, were commonly the subjects of critique.

=== Daphne Caruana Galizia's assassination and civil response ===
Daphne Caruana Galizia garnered international reputation as a resolute critic of political and business malpractice, despite being targeted by several SLAPP suits. Throughout 2017, she released a series of controversial and sensitive pieces of information that link a number of Maltese politicians to the Panama Papers. She was subsequently assassinated with a bomb installed into her car, on 16 October 2017. At the time of her death, she was fighting 48 libel suits.

Thousands of people attended a vigil in Caruana Galizia's hometown of Sliema the night of her murder. A series of monthly protests and vigils in remembrance of Caruana Galizia were held by civil society organisations on every sixteenth day of the month from October 2017 onward, in addition to ongoing anti-corruption protests and marches. These demonstrations, in opposition of secretive Panama accounts being opened by Maltese officials, had been consistently and formally organised for years leading up to Caruana Galizia's death. However, protests in Malta – some of them spontaneous – fundamentally transformed in meaning following her assassination, and evolved and intensified as more information about her murder has surfaced, implicating businessmen and politicians alike.

Her death was covered by international media, and the name Caruana Galizia began trending worldwide on Twitter.

On 22 October 2017, the Civil Society Network organised a protest demanding justice and calling for the immediate resignation of the Police Commissioner and the Attorney General.

Both Muscat and Delia expressed frustration over her death, viewing it as a representation of the "collapse of democracy and freedom of expression" Pope Francis sent a letter of condolence to the Maltese people. WikiLeaks founder Julian Assange announced that he would pay a €20,000 reward "for information leading to the conviction of Caruana Galizia's killers", stimulating the creation of additional crowdfunded campaigns and state-sanctioned rewards with similar goals.

In April 2018, a consortium of 45 international journalists published The Daphne Project, a collaboration between 18 news organizations including the locally syndicated newspaper Times of Malta, as well as The New York Times and The Guardian to complete her investigative work. In 2018 the European United Left–Nordic Green Left Award for Journalists, Whistleblowers & Defenders of the Right to Information was established in honor of Caruana Galizia.

In October 2019, as the second anniversary of the assassination approached, Civil Society organised a protest march, with the US Embassy issuing a statement, reiterating its offer to help Maltese investigators. Prime Minister Joseph Muscat insisted that the press misinterpreted this statement by the US embassy.

== Protests ==
=== 21 November 2019 ===
On 20 November, civil society groups led by Repubblika, Occupy Justice, and manueldelia.com, announced a protest in front of the Prime Minister's Office, Auberge de Castille, calling for Muscat's resignation. In their statement, the groups said that Muscat should have demanded Schembri and Mizzi's resignations when their names first appeared in the 2016 Panama Papers release. At the end of the protest, protestors walked to the makeshift memorial to Caruana Galizia at the foot of the Great Siege Memorial. Those present then gathered outside Parliament, shouting "barra, barra" (out, out) and "Mafia, Mafia" at Government politicians. At the same time, opposition members of parliament (MPs) walked out of Parliament over Muscat's failure to dismiss Schembri and Mizzi.

Protesters also assembled in the streets around the Parliament buildings, heckling and stopping a number of ministers' cars from leaving the area. Justice Minister Owen Bonnici's car was targeted by protesters as it left parliament, with the Minister describing how he stood by the Police Force, two of whom sustained minor injuries in the course of doing their duties.

=== 22 November 2019 ===
On 21 November, another protest was called for 22 November in front of Auberge de Castille. The organising groups stated that Muscat needed to shoulder political responsibility because had Muscat not failed to have Schembri and Mizzi removed, "Daphne Caruana Galizia would still be alive."

Thousands of protestors met in front of the Auberge de Castille, renewing calls for Muscat to resign, saying that justice for Caruana Galizia was being stifled.

=== 25 November 2019 ===
Another protest was called for 25 November 2019. That day pressure continued to mount for Mizzi and Schembri's resignation, with cabinet members commenting publicly on the need for the country not to protect murderers and money launderers, while Malta's reputation was suffering "almost irreparable" damage.

=== 26 November 2019 ===
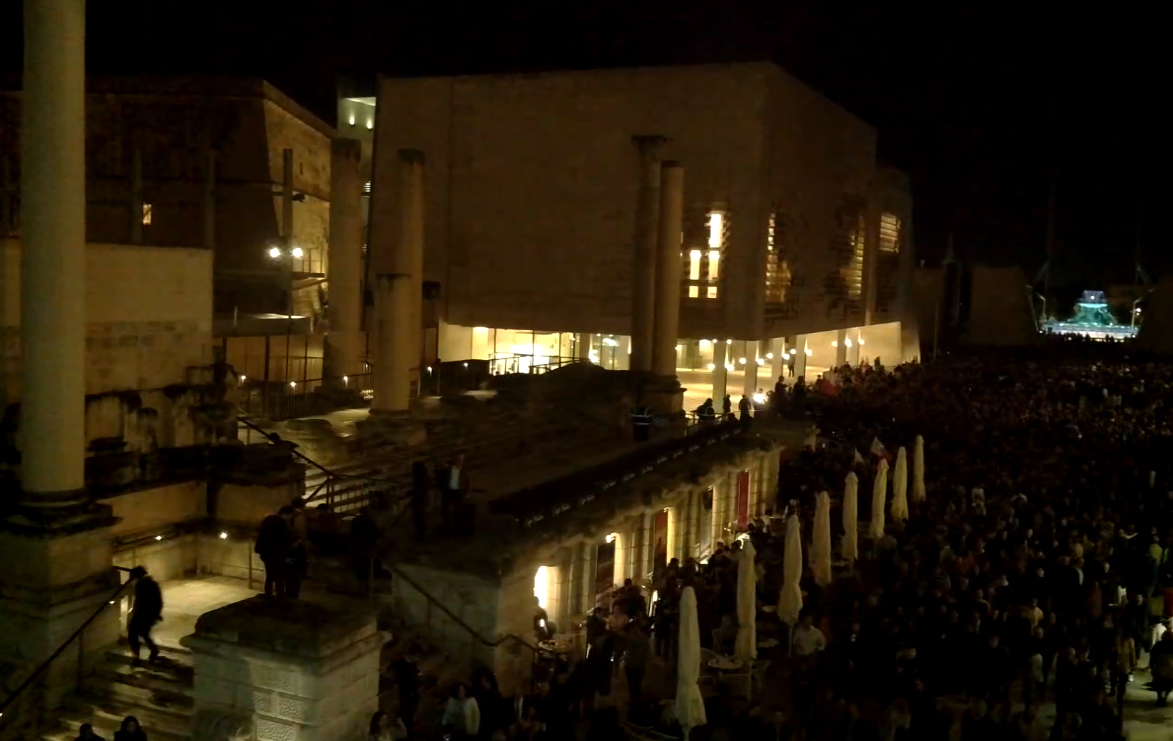
On 26 November, crowds gathered next to Parliament, calling for Muscat's resignation.

As the investigation into the Caruana Galizia murder continued, following further pressure, first Schembri and then Mizzi resigned from office. Schembri then faced questioning by police over allegations of his involvement in the Caruana Galizia case. Another minister, Chris Cardona, suspended himself in the wake of other police investigations. Prime Minister Muscat thanked Schembri, saying "I thank Keith for his hard work, he played a crucial role." A protest was held next to Parliament, hours after these political resignations. Hundreds of people gathered outside cried "shame on you" and "killers", with the angry crowd pelting ministerial cars with eggs and coins as they left. Muscat was shielded by security officers as he exited on his way to a Labour executive meeting in Hamrun. Protesters carried banners, flares, drums, megaphones, and flags to get their message across and shouted: "Daphne was right". The protest then moved from outside parliament to Castille Place, where protesters were addressed by Manuel Delia, one of the organisers, and other speakers. Protesters vowed they would protest until Muscat's resignation.

=== 27 November 2019 ===
Another demonstration called for Wednesday 27 November began as a protest march, ending in front of Auberge de Castille. This was the fifth protest in less than a week. Following the disturbances of 26 November, steel barricades were placed in front of parliament, Auberge de Castille and on Merchants' Street, as police increased security ahead of the day's planned protest.

After the main demonstration, protesters blocked traffic in Floriana as they demanded further resignations.

=== 28 November 2019 ===
An unannounced protest was held on 28 November, following reports of the release of Schembri from arrest. Fenech had claimed Schembri was responsible for the Caruana Galizia assassination in October 2017.

=== 29 November 2019 ===
In the early hours of the morning on 29 November, after the protest which began in the evening the previous day, unknown security officials clashed with demonstrators and journalists were forcibly kept within the Ambassadors' Hall in Auberge de Castille. Maltese and foreign journalists were kept against their will after attending a press conference organised at 3 a.m. Tensions escalated after the security officials refused to identify themselves to journalists, or tell them why they were not being let out of the building. The decision to keep journalists locked in the Ambassadors' Hall was condemned by the Institute of Maltese Journalists.

News broke that Muscat was named by Fenech in his first statement to the police. Protesters began a protest march in Valletta at 6:30 p.m., holding posters and Maltese flags while protesting at the government's handling of the criminal investigation. The protest followed news earlier in the day of Muscat's imminent resignation. After the main protest, a smaller crowd gathered beneath the Great Siege Monument in front of the Daphne memorial where flowers and candles were left in tribute.

=== 30 November 2019 ===
Moviment Graffiti organised a protest in the morning, with organisers saying that there was "nothing socialist, leftist or progressive about what the government had allowed to happen over the past few years, despite the fact that the Labour Party was supposed to hold true to these values." Protesters reiterated calls for Muscat to resign following the Caruana Galizia probe, and they were joined in their protest by author and activist Immanuel Mifsud, and Arnold Cassola, amongst other politicians, NGOs, academics and activists.

=== 1 December 2019 ===
Thousands of people descended on Valletta on Sunday, 1 December, demanding Muscat's resignation. Marching to shouts "Daphne was right," "Justice," and "Assassins," protesters insisted that Muscat was not their prime minister. Close to 20,000 protesters filled Republic Street in Valletta, by far the largest turnout at the time in weeks of protests aimed at Muscat's government. A protest march started in front of Parliament at 4 p.m. and moved to the square in front of the law courts, where protesters were addressed by activists. The protest was the largest one so far. Late in the evening on 1 December, Muscat announced his plan to resign on national television.

=== 2 December 2019 ===
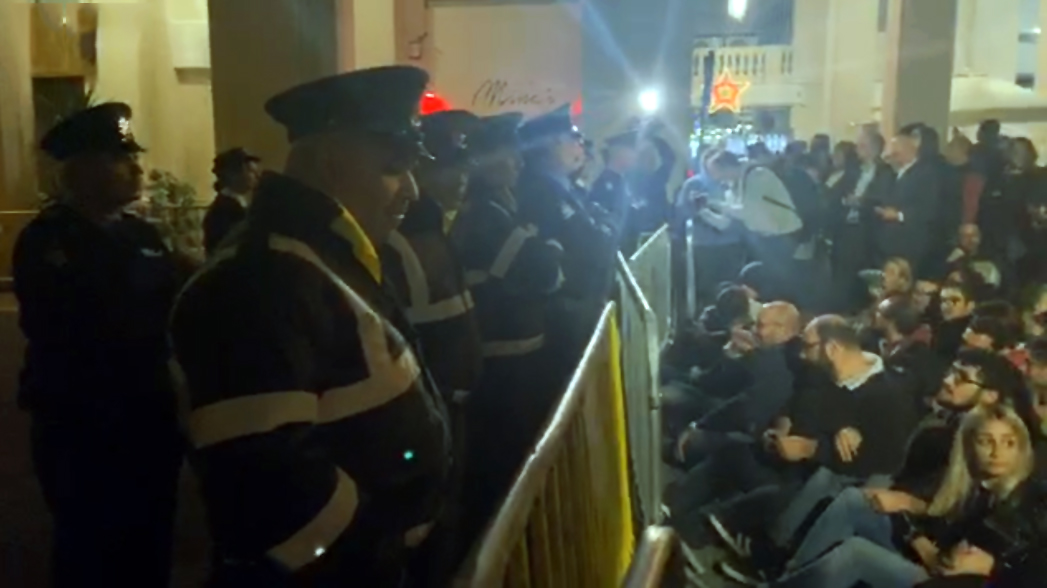
Protesters sitting-in on Ordnance Street to block Government MPs from leaving Parliament.

On Monday, 2 December 2019, access to Valletta's Freedom Square was heavily restricted as activists began to gather in front of parliament for the evening protest. Police also asked businesses located on Republic Street and Ordnance Street to close early in anticipation of the protest. Authorities laid out hundreds of metres of steel barricades in the square in front of parliament in the afternoon, considerably limiting the area in which civil society activists were able to protest. Opposition MPs walked out of Parliament, saying they will not attend any function with Muscat as prime minister. Protesters blocked politicians from leaving the Parliament building during the demonstration and demanded the resignation the Prime Minister.

Some kilometres away from the protest, government supporters turned up in Hamrun, in front of the Labour Party's headquarters, in an unofficial rally in support of Muscat.

=== 3 December 2019 ===
Early on Tuesday, 3 December, protesters greeted Prime Minister Muscat as he entered Castille, calling for his immediate resignation. Muscat was meeting with a delegation of the European Parliament dispatched to Malta for an urgent mission following a political crisis sparked by developments in the Caruana Galizia murder investigation. Justice Minister Bonnici and Muscat were egged on their way to meet the Members of the European Parliament (MEPs) at Castille. The square next to Auberge de Castille was then locked down by police barricades.

In the evening, protesters assembled outside the police headquarters building in Floriana. They demanded that the police arrest and interrogate Keith Schembri, the prime minister's former chief of staff, for his connection to the murder investigation of Daphne Caruana Galizia.

On 4 December, Parliament adjourned for its traditional Christmas recess amid great political turmoil. Opposition MPs boycotted the last sessions of Parliament as Muscat refused to resign immediately, with Parliament unanimously approving the Budget estimates in a marathon vote session.

=== 7 December 2019 ===
Maltese living or working in London organised a protest for 7 December in Parliament Square. Dozens of activists carried placards, and held banners, calling for Muscat's immediate resignation. On the day, Muscat attended a private audience with Pope Francis at the Vatican, with the meeting being shifted from an official visit to a private audience after a number of protests and letters were written asking the Pope not to meet with Muscat. Italian Prime Minister Giuseppe Conte cancelled a lunch with Muscat, opting for a private meeting at Palazzo Chigi instead.

=== 8 December 2019 ===
Another protest was called for Sunday, 8 December, demanding the immediate resignation of Muscat, and the investigation of all those named in the unfolding criminal investigations. Thousands walked on Castille in a protest march led by Caruana Galizia's parents, carrying flags, placards and chanting calls for justice and against corruption.

=== 12 December 2019 ===
As the middleman in the murder of Caruana Galizia was testifying in court, the Maltese community in Belgium staged a protest outside the Maltese Permanent Representation to the EU at Dar Malta in Brussels. This coincided with the opening of the European leaders' summit meeting, which was attended by the Prime Minister.

=== 13 December 2019 ===
On 11 December, a protest was called by NGOs for Friday, 13 December – coinciding with Republic Day, a national holiday in Malta. Insisting that Republic Day belonged to the people, NGOs encouraged people to attend. There were fears that the protest, coinciding with the official ceremonies, would clash with the official events marking the day. During the protest, police presence was heavy to ensure the peace between protesters and Maltese celebrating Republic Day, in particular around Castille. President George Vella, on his way to the Grandmaster's Palace for the official ceremonies, was greeted with both applause and jeers, with the crowd protesting, whistling and chanting throughout a military parade along Republic Street.

Home Affairs Minister Michael Farrugia insisted NGOs and protesters did not apply for a permit for the protests on Republic Day, while a Police statement admitted a meeting was held between the NGOs and police authorities two days before the protests to discuss civil society's role in the official ceremonies.

=== 16 December 2019 ===
On 16 December, NGO organiser Repubblika have asked for the President Vella's protection in view of an intimidation campaign, asking Vella's intervention with the authorities, to restrain confrontation, and confirm the non-violent nature of the protests. Organisers have said that protesters received death threats, and asked Vella to call on the Police Commissioner to obey the law, and have stated the NGO's members do not "feel protected by the Police Commissioner and the entire force." A vigil marking the 26th month since Caruana Galizia assassination was held in front of the makeshift memorial in Valletta, with the groups restating their commitment to protest until justice was made for Caruana Galizia and corruption removed from Government.

== Reactions ==
=== Reactions in Malta ===
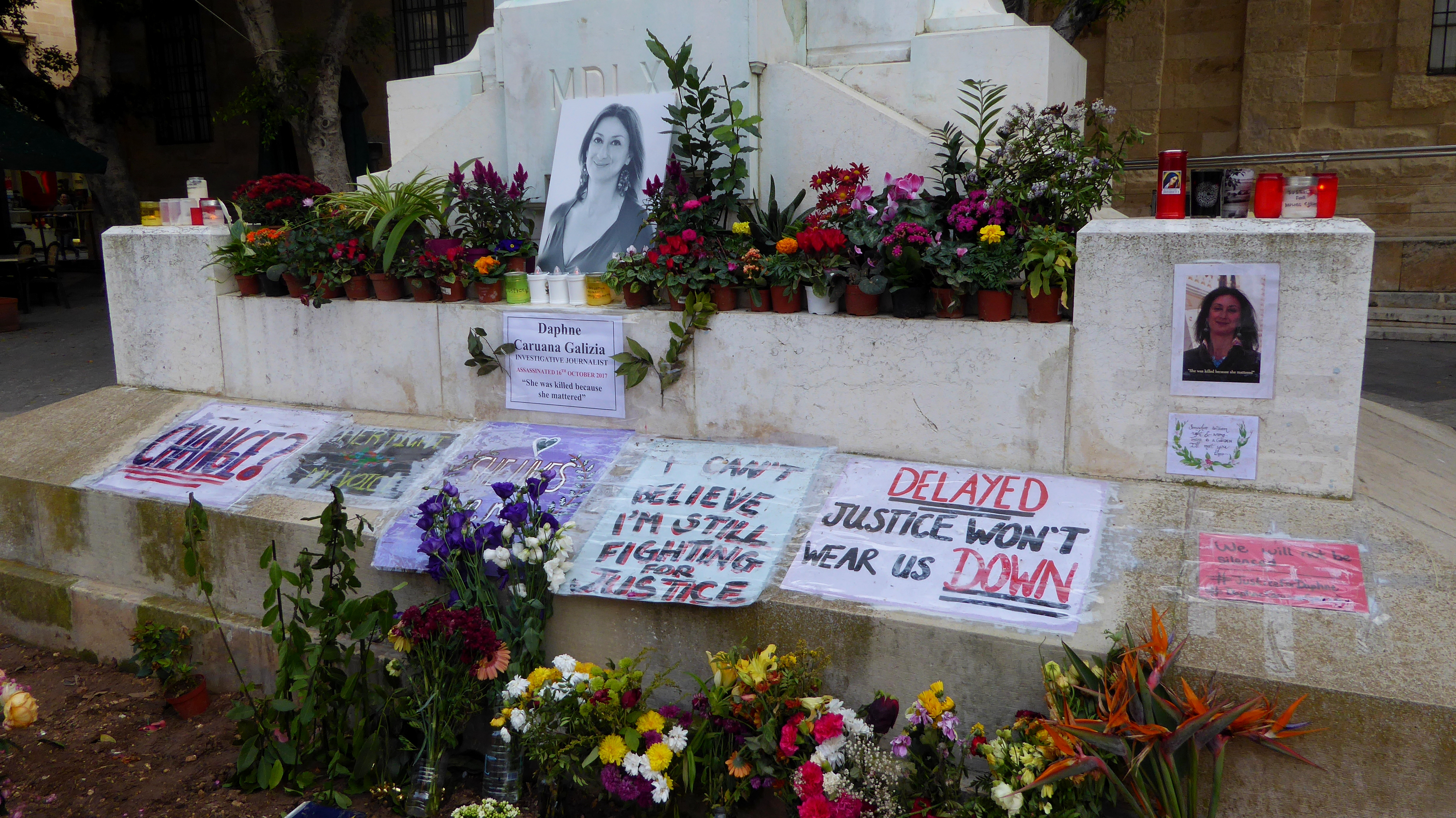
Makeshift memorial to Daphne Caruana Galizia at the Great Siege Monument, Valletta. The memorial was repeatedly cleared on ministerial orders, until these were reversed by new Prime Minister Robert Abela.

The President of Malta George Vella appealed for calm and unity, and asked to allow time for the institutions to work, saying that "Malta deserves better." The President cancelled a number of engagements, both locally and abroad, in light of the national crisis.

Constituted bodies and unions issued varied calls, with some asking for Muscat to step down and others prompting a more measured reaction asking for calm and maturity.

The Minister for Education, Evarist Bartolo, in a series of almost daily comments, reiterated that it was "not acceptable that people with money use politics, criminals to hijack country." Another government MP, Silvio Schembri, insisted that his loyalties lie with the Labour Party, and not with any other institution.

Former Chief Justice and former Judge of the European Court of Human Rights Vincent A. De Gaetano described the situation as an "institutional crisis" rather than a constitutional one, as the crisis affects other organs and actors which may not necessarily emanate from the Constitution, such as the "police force, political parties and the myriad regulatory bodies and public authorities and entities that keep being created." De Gaetano insists that the President has a "moral duty" to act and denounce whatever is eroding the Constitution.

As protests in Malta intensified, the Bishops of Malta and the Bishop of Gozo appealed for national unity, urging people "not to fall into trap of hatred, lies and violence."

Government authorities continued to remove a makeshift memorial to Caruana Galizia in front of the Law Courts, even a few hours after protesters leave flowers and photographs. When asked, workers cleaning the monument simply claimed they were receiving "orders from above".

=== International reactions ===
The EU confirmed that it would send a mission to Malta to investigate the state of the rule of law in the country, referencing Caruana Galizia's case. The President of the EU Commission Ursula von der Leyen said the Commission is following the situation in Malta very closely. In December 2019, a European Parliament (EP) fact finding mission called for Muscat's immediate resignation, with its leading MEP saying she was "not reassured", claiming trust between the EU and Malta was seriously damaged and that Muscat had not allayed her concerns. EU Justice Commissioner Didier Reynders cited his "big concern" about Malta. The EU also pressured Malta to speed up its judicial reforms.

In December 2019, the EP piled further pressure on the commission, with a motion having MEPs "express their regret that the European Commission in recent years refrained from taking any concrete measures towards the [Maltese] government," with developments in Malta in recent years leading to a "serious and persistent threats to the rule of law, democracy and fundamental rights." A resolution was passed with a large majority at the EP, which called on Muscat to resign immediately over the Caruana Galizia case, questioning the "integrity and credibility" of the murder investigation with Muscat in government.

MEP Sven Giegold called on the EU to begin suspension procedures against Malta under Article 7 of the treaty on EU, recommending the opening of an investigation into the rule of law and various policy decisions taken by the Muscat government. This step was reportedly seen by the commission as a viable option for the Maltese situation.

The President of the European Parliament David Sassoli passed on a letter by the EU mission in Malta to European leaders urging them to take a stance on Malta following "alarming" findings made by the mission in early December, with the letter calling for Muscat's immediate resignation. The head of the EPP, Manfred Weber, insisted it was a "huge scandal" that Muscat remained in office, saying that he should have resigned immediately.

With Finland holding the EU Council's rotating presidency, Finnish European Affairs Minister Tytti Tupparainen said she was concerned by the rule of law situation in Malta. Dutch Prime Minister Mark Rutte told reporters that he had had "a long conversation" with Muscat, emphasising "that, pending his departure as prime minister, it is important that a separation of his office in Malta and the further prosecution [of the murder] is guaranteed, that this is crucial." Muscat assured Rutte that "this was the case," with Rutte saying he "will now try to keep an eye on this as much as possible.” Charles Michel, the EU council president, however, said that the Caruana Galizia murder investigation was not discussed during the two day summit in December 2019.

Reporters Without Borders UK director Rebecca Vincent underscored the lack of political accountability in Malta around the case, as well as the problems relating to rule of law and freedom of expression.

Carlo Bonini, an Italian mafia expert and author of a book on the investigations carried out by Caruana Galizia, described Malta as a "mafia-state [...] revealing how democracies can degenerate."

== See also ==
- 2019 Malta political crisis
- The Daphne Project
- Politics of Malta
- European Centre for Press and Media Freedom
- Murder of Ján Kuciak
