= 2019 Malta political crisis =

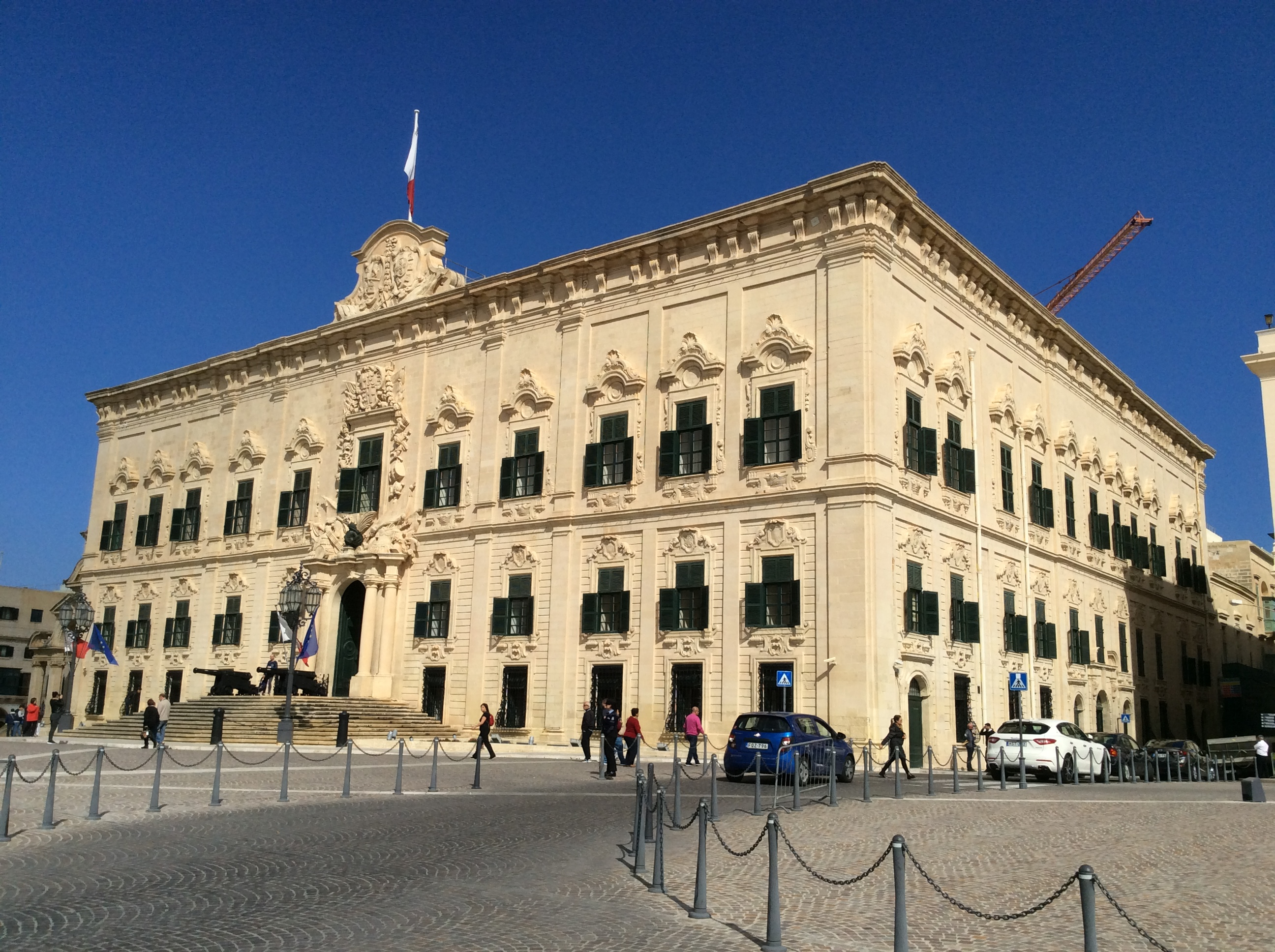
Protest of Maltese civil society rises at the Auberge de Castille, the office of Prime Minister Joseph Muscat

A political and institutional crisis within the Republic of Malta followed the uncovering of links between government officials and the 2017 assassination of investigative journalist Daphne Caruana Galizia. The Prime Minister's Chief of Staff Keith Schembri and Minister for Tourism Konrad Mizzi resigned following the arrest of businessman Yorgen Fenech in connection with the murder.

On 1 December 2019, the Prime Minister Joseph Muscat announced his intention to resign on 12 January 2020 after increased pressure from 2019 Maltese protests. An EU mission called for his immediate resignation. Constitutional experts, legal bodies and other representatives stated Muscat's decision to remain in office until January 2020 and to have a six-week parliamentary recess over Christmas had led to a constitutional crisis.

== Background ==
Since accession to the EU in 2004, Malta enjoyed a financial boom fuelled by online gambling, crypto-currency exchanges, the sale of EU-citizenship, and a financial centre with a reputation for lax controls on money laundering and tax evasion. According to The Guardian, the country has been used as a gateway into Europe for money from Libya, Azerbaijan, Russia and Venezuela.

In 2018, the European Central Bank revoked the licence of Pilatus Bank, which had first been investigated by the journalist Daphne Caruana Galizia, after its Iranian owner was arrested on sanctions-busting charges by US prosecutors. Among other things, Caruana Galizia wrote about gifts and money from the presidential family in Azerbaijan to Malta's Prime Minister Joseph Muscat, his wife and connections between opposition leader Adrian Delia and a prostitution ring in London. She has been described as "one-woman-Wikileaks" and one of the most important, visible and fearless journalists of the country. She ran a popular blog called Running Commentary, which investigated allegations of corruption and other criminal wrongdoing which Caruana Galizia alleged, ran into the highest levels of Maltese government. In a murder plot, she was killed in a car bomb attack to her Peugeot 108 on 16 October 2017.

== Persons involved in the crisis ==
=== Yorgen Fenech ===
Yorgen Fenech served as head of Tumas Group and a director of energy company Electrogas until he resigned from both positions in 2019. In 2018 he was identified as the owner of a Dubai-registered company, called 17 Black. The company was listed in the Panama Papers. Caruana Galizia had written about 17 Black eight months before her death, alleging the company had links to the Prime Minister Joseph Muscat's chief of staff Keith Schembri and to former energy minister Konrad Mizzi. The political blogger Manuel Delia assumes Fenech wanted to cover up a bribe scandal, which Caruana had uncovered. Yorgen Fenech's "17 Black" company had spent millions on offshore accounts of several Labour Government ministers, evidence was found only after Caruana Galizia's murder.

=== Joseph Muscat ===
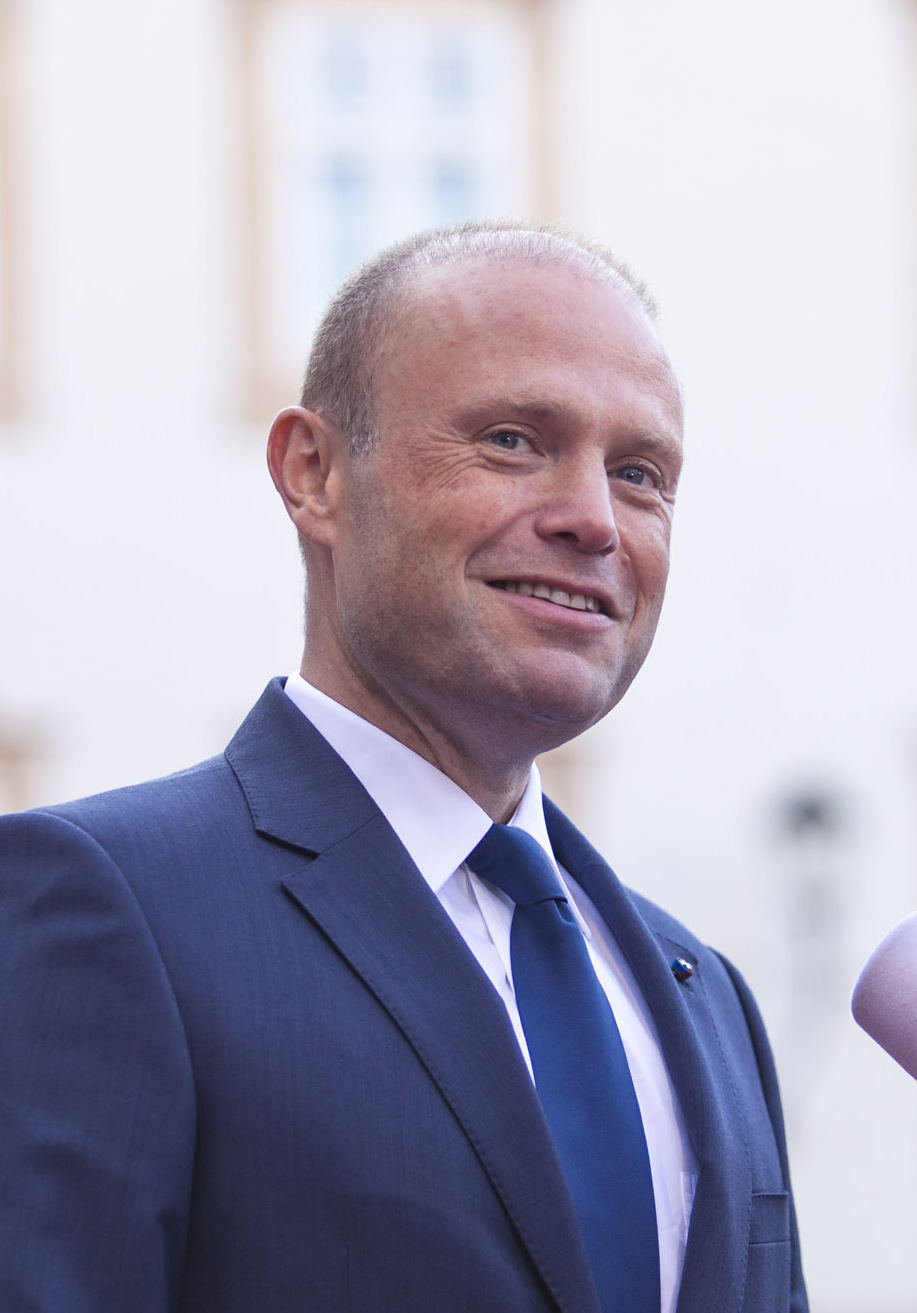
Joseph Muscat, 2018

Joseph Muscat, Prime Minister of Malta, promised a fair investigation after the murder. In November 2019, clues pointed directly to the immediate circle of the head of government in the case. Since his resignation as Prime Minister in January 2020, Muscat is a back bench MP in the Labour Party.

=== Keith Schembri ===
Keith Schembri was chief of staff of the Office of the Prime Minister. He is said to be one of the most powerful persons in Maltese politics. Schembri was the subject of Caruana Galizia's last blog post, minutes before she got killed. Caruana Galizia alleged he had benefited from secretive shell companies.

Schembri was a successful businessman before entering politics. His Kasco Holding bought paper, sold it to the printers in Malta and expanded into the trade of printing machines. His many clients included the Times of Malta, the oldest newspaper of Malta. Control of newsprint supplies allowed Schembri to often put pressure on newspapers to suppress or promote stories. Kasco also invested in beverage brands, restaurants and luxury furniture. In 2008, Joseph Muscat brought his friend Schembri to the Labour Party. Schembri updated the stale communication style of Partit Laburista. In 2013, Schembri was appointed as the "Chief of staff", a newly created position in the organigram of the ruling government.

When Schembri was arrested in 2019, the police investigation drew close to members of Joseph Muscat's government. Schembri was arrested at 5.30am on 26 November by Inspector Keith Arnaud and Inspector Kurt Zahra with no other officials present. Schembri's personal phone had been turned off around 5am, and Schembri claims he had lost it; it has not been recovered, and police did not search the house again. Police released Schembri some days later, announcing he was no longer viewed as a person of interest. Schembri admitted he had a family trust in New Zealand which owned a Panama corporation. Schembri resigned from the Labour Party in December 2019. In September 2020, Schembri was re-arrested on a money laundering charge, a court order froze his assets and an administrator was appointed to run his businesses.

=== Konrad Mizzi ===
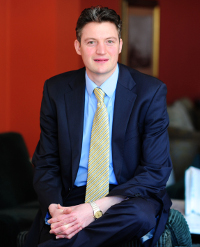
Konrad Mizzi, 2012

Konrad Mizzi was removed from his post as health and energy minister in 2016 after it emerged that he had set up a company in Panama, listed in the Panama Papers. He said, he had merely made arrangements for managing family assets through a family trust in New Zealand which owned the Panama corporation and had done nothing wrong. He became tourism minister but stepped down in November 2019 saying it was his duty to allow Mr Muscat's government to continue. In his health role he oversaw the part-privatisation of Malta's health service. In December 2019, Muscat gave Mizzi a consultancy job paying €80,000 p.a. plus bonuses, with the Malta Tourism Authority. Robert Abela appointed him as the Head of the Maltese delegation to the Parliamentary Assembly of the Organization for Security and Co-operation in Europe. When it became known, public anger at these appointments forced the government into a U-turn.

In June 2020, Mizzi was kicked out of the Labour Party after he refused Abela's request to resign. Mizzi continued as an independent MP.

In November 2020, summoned to attend the public inquiry into the murder of Daphne Caruana Galizia, Mizzi refused to answer any questions in open court or behind closed doors, simply stating that "As a minister in Cabinet, I always followed the instructions of my prime minister..."

=== Zammit Lewis ===
In January 2020, Abela appointed Edward Zammit Lewis, MP and long standing friend of Joseph Muscat, as Minister for Justice.

=== Melvin Theuma ===
Melvin Theuma is a taxi-driver from Valletta linked to criminal enterprises and was arrested in November 2019 in connection with a separate anti-money laundering investigation. Theuma offered police information about the 2017 murder in exchange for immunity from prosecution. He is described as a middle-man between the commissioners and the murders.

Theuma had made and retained secret recordings of conversations which he had with him when he was arrested for running an illegal lottery on 14 November 2019, he then used these as leverage to get the Police Commissioner, Attorney General and the Prime Minister to agree to the terms of a presidential pardon within a day of his arrest, with Joseph Muscat signing the agreement to the pardon some three days later without discussing the matter with his cabinet, as per the norm. President George Vella, on 25 November 2019, at the request of Prime Minister Joseph Muscat granted the pardon.

=== Lawrence Cutajar ===
Lawrence Cutajar was responsible for the investigation in the assassination case of Caruana as commissioner of the Malta Police Force. Muscat had always refused to remove Cutajar. Cutajar resigned at the request of the new prime Minister Robert Abela. On the day of his resignation as commissioner, 17 January 2020, Cutajar signed a contract to become a part time consultant with the Home Affairs Ministry at a salary of €31,040 p.a., compared to his previous full time salary of €37,946 as police commissioner. The consultancy contract was terminated in June 2020 after revelations in court. In June 2020, Angelo Gafà was appointed to replace Cutejar.

=== Chris Cardona ===
In January 2017, Caruana Galizia accused Chris Cardona, an MP, Minister for the Economy, Investment and Small Business and Deputy Leader of the Labour Party that he visited a brothel with his aide Joe Gerada, while in Germany on official government business. Both Cardona and Gerada denied the claims and instituted libel suits, which were thrown out of court when Caruana Galizia was killed. Journalists in 2018 provided a possible link with the Degiorgio brothers, and in November 2019 a letter purportedly from Schembri was passed to Fenech which may have been an attempt to frame Cardona for the murder of Caruana Galizia. In January 2020 he lost his Ministerial position, resigned as an MP in April and was removed as Labour deputy leader in June 2020.

=== Caruana Galizia family ===
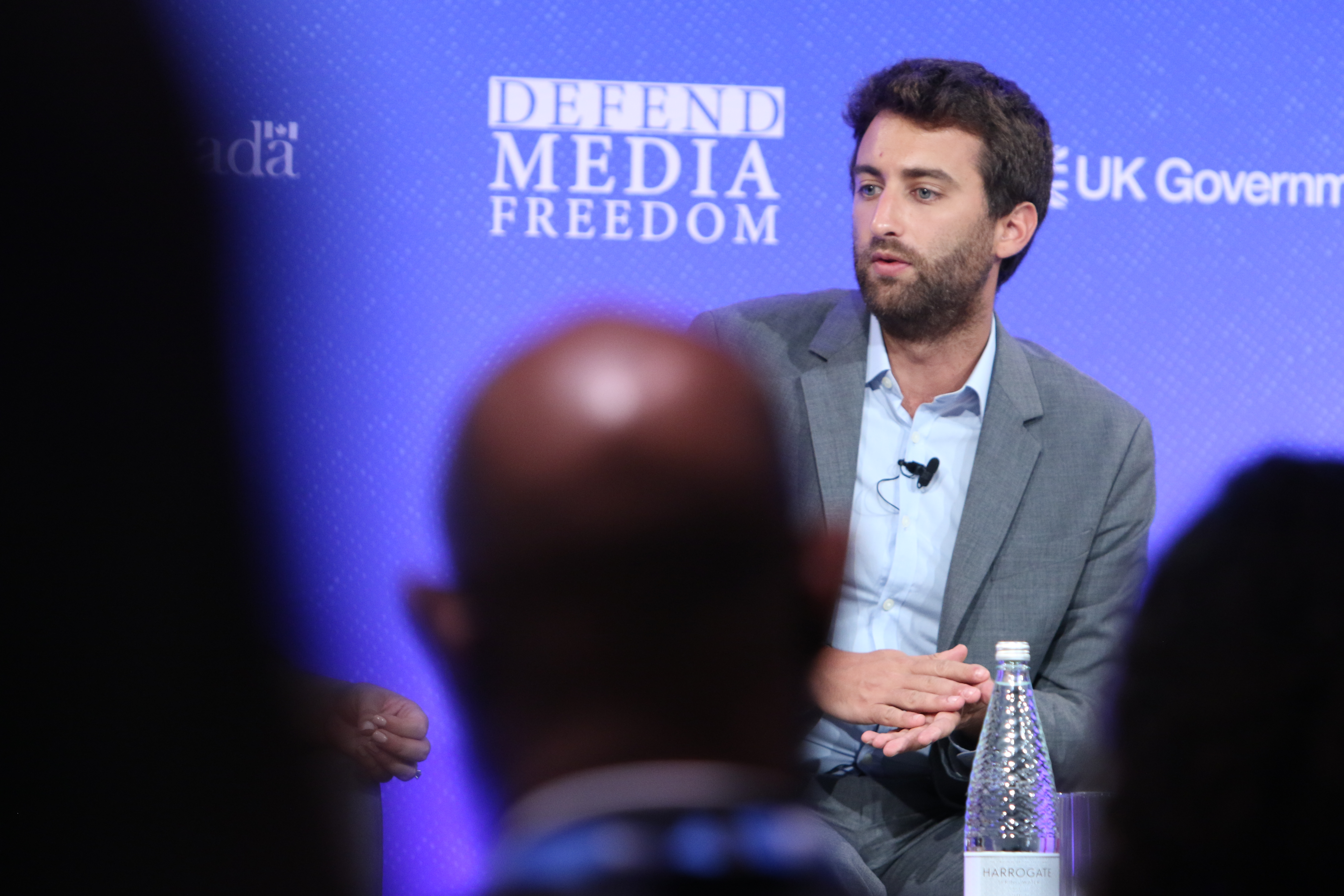
Matthew Caruana Galizia, Journalist and son of Daphne Caruana Galizia at the Global Conference for Media Freedom in July 2019 in London.

On 2 December 2019, the relatives of Caruana Galizia initiated legal action against Muscat. They demanded the immediate resignation of the prime minister, stipulating that his remaining in power was not to be tolerated by all who cared about justice: "His role in investigating the murder of our wife and mother is unlawful."

== Timeline ==
In 2015, Caruana Galizia exposed a Ponzi scheme, investigated by the FBI, involving Maltese companies owned by two daughters of John Dalli, a former Nationalist Party Minister in Malta until 2004 and European Commissioner from 2010 until forced to resign in 2012 over allegations of a €60 million bribe. Maltese court action against Dalli was still delayed in 2017 despite the Police Commissioner wishing to proceed. His daughters were charged in late 2017. Linked by Daphne Galizia in February 2017 to 17 Black, Dalli denied any involvement.

On 16 October 2017, the investigative journalist Caruana Galizia died in a car bomb attack close to her home, attracting widespread local and international reactions. In December 2017, three men were arrested in connection with the car bomb attack.

=== Revelations by Melvin Theuma in 2019 ===
On 14 November 2019, Melvin Theuma was arrested as part of an investigation into illegal gambling. Under questioning by police, Theuma made the claim that he had acted as intermediary in the contract killing of journalist Caruana Galizia. When Theuma called for his lawyers, he asked for Jason Azzopardi and his colleague Simon Busuttil. Both are the Caruana Galizia family lawyers, and both are members of parliament for the opposition Nationalist Party. The Guardian described both as "the forefront of the battle to hold Muscat's government to account."

On 19 November 2019, Muscat announced a deal with star-witness Melvin Theuma who would provide comprehensive information about the murder case and other crimes, while he receives immunity.

On 20 November, Yorgen Fenech attempted to leave Malta on his private yacht, with the Armed Forces of Malta intercepting his boat and arresting him as a "person of interest" in the Caruana Galizia murder enquiry. Maltese media alleged that Fenech was familiar with Melvin Theuma, a taxi driver with links to criminal enterprises who had been described in local media as a potential "middleman" in the murder.

On 23 November 2019, Fenech offered himself as a witness. He promised information about the murder case and other offenses, in exchange for immunity.

On 25 November 2019, star witness Melvin Theuma was granted immunity from prosecution by President George Vella at the request of Prime Minister Joseph Muscat.

Fenech's defence tried to call the whole process into question. His defence claimed he was prejudiced in public, and that he could not hope for a proper investigation and a fair trial. He argued that the second main suspect, Keith Schembri, had not been charged and that Schembri had built star witness Melvin Theuma against Fenech and paid for it. This was partially successful - Fenech was released on 29 November 2019 before being re-arrested. Fenech called for a presidential pardon, but it was not granted.

=== Revelations by Yorgen Fenech ===
Following his arrest and in order to encourage a Presidential pardon, Fenech made various statements and allegations concerning other people including:

- Fenech claims that Muscat discussed Theuma with him twice in early 2019, at the former prime minister's birthday bash when he was summoned to a meeting with Muscat and Schembri at Auberge de Castille.
- Fenech admitted to being a middleman and that Keith Schembri ordered the murder.
- Joseph Muscat had asked Fenech if his chief of staff Keith Schembri had featured in recordings secretly taken by Daphne Caruana Galizia murder middleman Melvin Theuma.
- Joseph Muscat also warned Fenech that the police would be forced to carry out a raid on Theuma at some point.
- Claims that Keith Schembri fed key details of the investigations, obtained through his “close relationship” with leading prosecutor Keith Arnaud to Fenech.
- Schembri informed Fenech that his phone was being tapped.
- Joseph Muscat was one of three people who knew about Fenech's involvement in the assassination.
- Keith Schembri knew middleman Melvin Theuma and Fenech set up a meeting between the two to secure Mr Theuma a government job.

=== Keith Schembri and other governmental staff ===
On 26 November 2019, six days after Fenech's arrest, Schembri resigned his government post, and police subsequently arrested him for questioning. Schembri was later released. Schembri, Fenech and Joseph Muscat belonged to a private WhatsApp chat group, Schembri and Fenech had exchanged over 900 WhatsApp messages in 2019. Joseph Muscat left the chat group in October 2019. Fenech and Schembri were long time friends, Fenech having paid two US medical bills for Schembri totalling €24,000 in 2016. Joseph Muscat had stayed at a hotel in France with Edward Zammit Lewis owned by Yorgen Fenech at Évian-les-Bains and received gifts of watches and wine from Fenech. Fenech and Zammit Lewis exchanged 700 messages between January and October 2019 and they went out for meals together.

On 30 November 2019, an indictment was filed against Fenech in Valletta, and he was accused of complicity in the murder of Caruana Galizia, amongst other charges. Fenech pleaded not guilty but was remanded in custody.

Adrian Vella, a personal physician to Fenech, was also arrested. Vella was named as a director of a number of companies registered or managed in Panama. He is said to have served as a secret messenger between Schembri and Fenech. Vella was also suspected of trying to obstruct justice by admitting Fenech to hospital on 23 November, so interrupting his questioning after Fenech complained of chest pains.

Yorgen Fenech, in his court statement, accused Schembri of being the mastermind behind the Caruana Galizia murder. Schembri was also accused of influencing Fenech in order to frame Chris Cardona as responsible for the murder.

=== Muscat resignation ===
Joseph Muscat announced his resignation on 1 December 2019 in a televised speech, saying he would step down after Labour Party internal elections on 12 January 2020. He informed the President of Malta, George Vella, that he would be resigning his duties once his successor had been elected. His decision was influenced by the investigation into the Caruana Galizia murder.

About 4000 Maltese blocked Muscat and other MPs from leaving the Parliament Building in Valletta on 3 December 2019. The Nationalist Party announced a boycott of any parliament session until Muscat stepped down. Several hundred people from the Labour Party met for a demonstration against the anti-government protests.

On the same day, Reporters sans Frontieres, together with the relatives of Caruana Galizia, filed a lawsuit against three of the alleged key figures in the murder case in France. The lawsuit was filed with the Finance Prosecutor's Office and the Paris Public Prosecutor's Office accusing Yorgen Fenech, Keith Schembri and Konrad Mizzi of murder and bribery.

Muscat resigned on 13 January 2020 and was replaced by Robert Abela as prime minister of Malta.

=== Protests ===
Public protests from 20 November 2019 until 16 December 2019 were a major contributor in forcing the resignation of Joseph Muscat.

=== 2020 revelations ===
==== Panama papers ====
The April 2016, leak of the 11.5 million Panama Papers was being investigated by journalists including Daphne Caruana Galizia, who had accused the prime minister's chief of staff, Keith Schembri and tourism Minister Konrad Mizzi with graft linked to Panamanian companies. Yorgen Fenech was identified by work undertaken by Daphne Caruana Galizia and other investigators as the owner of a Dubai corporation, 17 Black Ltd which reportedly received millions from an Azerbaijani national and it was 17 Black that was due to make payments to Panama corporations owned by Schembri and Mizzi, of €5,000 per day.

Concessions were granted to Azerbaijani figures in relation to a proposed power station construction project in Malta. Fenech was a director of ElectroGas Malta, which was awarded a power station contract. The then Prime Minister Joseph Muscat had claimed on 1 December 2019 that the power station issue was the reason for the murder of Daphne Caruana Galizia.

The links seeming to connect the Azerbaijani figures, Electro Gas, Fenech, 17 Black, two Panama corporations, Schembri and Mizzi are still being investigated.

==== Panama corporations ====
Adrian Vella, physician of both Yorgen Fenech and Keith Schembri who was thought to be a go-between the two men was arrested for questioning. Vella's name also occurred in a number of companies registered or managed via Panama. He is said to have served as a secret messenger between Schembri and Fenech.

Two Panama corporations were acquired in 2013 by Nexia BT before being transferred to Keith Schembri and Konrad Mizzi.

Caruana Galizia claimed there was a link between Egrant, a Panama corporation and Michelle Muscat, wife of former prime minister Joseph Muscat. Malta's Financial Intelligence Analysis Unit (FIAU) investigated the claim and a manager of FIAU, Jonathan Ferris, a former police inspector, claimed a €600,000 transaction by a politically exposed person in Azerbaijan was made to Buttardi, a company owned by a close friend of Michelle Muscat. Joseph Muscat instigated an enquiry which found no evidence of Egrant being owned by Michelle Muscat nor could it find evidence to back the claim by Jonathan Ferris. The investigating magistrate Bugeja, now appointed a judge, ordered perjury investigations on Maria Efimova an employee of Pilatus Bank and Ferris as well as a probe into who had falsified documents linking Egrant to Michelle Muscat. Ferris and Egrant whistleblower, Maria Efimova have been charged with perjury with Efimova also charged with having made false accusations against Superintendent Denis Theuma and inspectors Jonathan Ferris and Lara Butters.

==== ElectroGas Malta ====
A December 2014 visit by Joseph Muscat as Prime Minister, his chief of staff Keith Schembri and Energy Minister Konrad Mizzi resulted in the signing of a memorandum to buy liquid natural gas (LNG) for 18 years from the State Oil Company of Azerbaijan Republic SOCAR as fuel for a new power station in Malta.

ElectroGas Malta (EGM) which won the contract to build the €510 million project had Yorgen Fenech as a director and a shareholder, Tumas energy, headed by Yorgen Fenech, was also a shareholder through GEM holdings, whereas Siemens and SOCAR held 33.3% each directly. In 2015 EGM was granted sole rights to sell SOCAR gas to Malta. EGM is contracted to sell electricity and LNG to Enemalta for 18 years. The first batch of LNG was bought by EGM from SOCAR for $113 million and sold by them to Enemalta for $153 million, further deliveries generated similar profits, however EGM recorded accounting losses each year, €23 million in 2017, the accounts of EGM fail to explain Socar Trading SA which made an estimated €32 million from the deal in 2017 or why EGM did not buy LNG directly from suppliers, leaked documents about this were sent to Daphne Caruana Galizia a few months before her death.

EGM took out a €450 million loan to finance the project, only secured following a €360 million state guarantee, in October 2017 Keith Schembri working with Yorgen Fenech got the government to extend the guarantee. The loan, mainly from four French banks is being investigated in France to see what due diligence was undertaken before making the loan in November 2017.

Konrad Mizzi, waived the right in 2017 to €40 million in excise duty from Electrogas on electricity production, which the shareholders of Electrogas did not want to bear, in breach of the tender terms, following an agreement with Fenech. Enemalta had to pick up the tax bill, having paid €5 million of duty to date that should have been paid by Electrogas. Mizzi also arranged for deferred penalties of €18 million due from Electrogas for power station delays, getting Enemalta to agree receipts over 18 years at 2% interest.

In 2018, the Auditor General concluded his enquiry into the 2013 tender and contract process in 2020, it shows the tender was a “premeditated” effort to award the contract to EGM and that the electricity purchased by Enemalta from EMG was significantly higher than that bought over the interconnector. There were significant due diligence concerns in the Electrogas tender, the late inclusion of a security of supply agreement helped the then bidders and reduced their risks, the bank guarantee provided by the bank was irregular, but there was no evidence of a "done deal".

==== Možura wind farm ====
As of June 2020, investigations were being undertaken regarding Enemalta Plc and the Možura Wind Farm project in Montenegro with accusations that 17 Black made €4.6 million profit in the acquisition by Enemalta of shares in Možura. The deal was first discussed by Enemalta in late 2014. After a board meeting on Enemalta in January 2015, a Seychelles company Cifidex entered into an agreement with the Spanish consortium licensed to run the 46 MW wind farm to buy the shares for 2.9 million euros.

The shares were acquired by Enemalta with 90% sold to a consortium of Shanghai Electric, Enemalta, Vestigo and Envision Energy for 10.3 million euros from Cifidex, which had completed their own purchase of the shares just two weeks earlier in December 2015 after Cifidex had been funded with €3 million by 17 Black.

==== Gaming ====
Yorgen Fenech was the Tumas Group CEO, his uncle Raymond Fenech being the chairman, when in 2016 the gaming licence for the Portomaso casino came up for renewal. Rival gaming company Dragonara Gaming complained in 2017 that the renewal was granted without a public call for bids in breach of European Regulations, the Malta Gaming Authority (MGA) deciding to renew Tumas Gaming's licence to run the casino in August 2016.

Joseph Cuschieri headed the MGA, and Edwina Licari was the regulator's legal counsel when the licence was granted. Licari had drafted the application in September 2015 on behalf of Fenech and Tumas, sending the draft via a private email rather than through the MGA system. The draft was copied to Tumas letterhead and sent to Cuschieri in October 2015 who wrote back a week later confirming the licence would be renewed. Cuschieri and Licari denied any wrongdoing.

Cuschieri and Licari moved on to similar roles at the Malta Financial Service Authority (MFSA) in early 2018. Cuschieri, Licari, Yorgen Fenech and Charlene Bianco Farrugia (secretary in the Office of the Prime Minister and former PA to Keith Schembri) went in May 2018 on a Las Vegas trip to Caesars Palace, funded by Fenech, to give Fenech regulatory advice, whilst Cuschieri and Licari were giving evidence in the legal case brought against MGA. After an MFSA investigation, Joseph Cushieri resigned as CEO of MFSA on 25 November 2020, Licari was permitted to continue in her post as legal counsel.

In 2019, Dragonara Gaming was granted a 64-year extension to their own gaming concession without a public tender process by economy Minister Chris Cardona which was unanimously approved by parliament. The Tumas Group disassociated themselves in November 2019 from Yorgen Fenech, just before his arrest.

Healthcliff Farrugia former Malta Gaming Authority CEO colluded with Fenech to hide money laundering issues within Tumas in 2018 resulting in no notification about the breaches uncovered during the inspection were ever made public. A new investigation resulted in Tumas being fined €233,156 in 2021.

==== Fenech lawyers ====
Two lawyers on the team representing Yorgen Fenech were under investigation following allegations that they tried to bribe a reporter for the Times of Malta on 2 November 2020. The magistrate threw the case out saying the Attorney General had not indicated the relevant type of bribery.

==== Bank robberies ====
Vincent Muscat as part of his request for a pardon provided the police with statements regarding other criminal acts that had taken place in Malta including one involving an, as yet, unnamed Labour politician and cabinet member who was involved in an attempted armed robbery of the HSBC headquarters in Malta in 2010. The robbery, which appeared to have received inside knowledge and assistance, was unsolved and involved eight key parties with an additional three having knowledge of the crime. The robbery failed when the police were alerted resulting in a shootout outside the bank.

The crime went to Court in 2022. Convicted bank robber Darren Debono was granted a plea deal of 10 years in 2022 so that he would testify against his accomplices, having received the deal which included attempted murder charges being dropped, he later refused to testify at the trial of Vincent Muscat. He was sentenced to an additional 3 months for not testifying.

==== Phantom job ====
After Yorgen Fenech introduced Keith Schembri to Melvin Theuma, Theuma was employed by a government company from 1 May 2017, a few months before the murder. Tony Muscat, the former CEO of the company told police that Keith Schembri put pressure on him to employ Mr. Theuma. Mr. Theuma said he landed the job after meeting Keith Schembri in April 2017 and being given a guided tour of the Auberge de Castille including Prime Minister Joseph Muscat's offices, but never turned up for work, he continued to receive a salary of around 1,200 Euros a month. Following a police investigation into what they call a “phantom job”, a court case took place in October 2022 with five defendants.

==== Golden Passports ====
Keith Schembri was amongst those arrested in September 2020 in relation to allegations that he took a €100,000 kickback on passport sales to three wealthy Russians, from his auditor Brian Tonna. Nexia BT partners Tonna and Karl Cini were also arrested. The allegations had become public when Caruana Galizia had written about the kickbacks in April 2017. Malta started selling passports in 2013, whilst originally permitted and despite changing the rules on eligibility, the European Commission considers that Malta and Cyprus are still breaking EU law in how they sell passports. Around 1,800 passports had gone to successful main applicants by 2020, generating €21 million in 2023 for Malta. The situation regarding Schembri, Tonna and Cini is pending in November 2023.

With Malta the only country still issuing golden passports, the European Commission said in September 2022 that it will take Malta to the Court of Justice of the European Union.

==== Vitals Global Healthcare ====
Three Ministers at the time, Edward Scicluna, Chris Cardona and Konrad Mizzi, face investigation regarding Vitals Global Healthcare (VGH) which took control of three hospitals under a contract to last for 30 years in 2015.

VGH had no experience and accusations that the bidding process was skewed, with the bidding process announcing 3 bids, one of which was only a letter of non-interest, the second was from a small company operating a single hospital in India and VGH. The contract terms were also considered biased with the government having to bail out VGH if it got into debt and it would cost €100 million plus guarantee all investment by Steward and pay company debts to buy the contract back. The Minister in charge of all aspects of the deal was Konrad Mizzi, with final approval coming from Cabinet. Edward Scicluna, the Finance Minister of Malta from 2013 to 2020, claims he was not aware of the deal before it was signed, although he had asked Mizzi for copies of the contract in summer 2016 but was not supplied with the side letter that had the €100 million penalty clause so claims he was unaware of it.

When VGH Malta was created, an identically named company was established in Jersey, together with 11 other companies, Shaukat Ali Ghafoor, who bought a Maltese passport to obtain citizenship, is named as an investor who created the Jersey companies, possibly to profit from the sale to Steward, VGH was being investigated by Daphne Caruana Galizia before her death.

In 2018 a majority of shares in VGH were acquired by a US healthcare giant Steward Health Care for a nominal €1, It cost the Maltese government €50 million to pay off VGH.

In July 2020 the Auditor General, Charles Deguara published his report into the Vitals concession tender, concluding that it should have been scrapped, having found there was collusion between the government and the private investors who won the contract. Court hearings have backed the government in cancelling the hospitals contract which it called fraudulent and declared that Vitals/Steward actions regarding the $100m side letter are possibly criminal.

In May 2024, Joseph Muscat, Konrad Mizzi, and Keith Schembri were formally charged along with others for alleged crimes related to the Vitals/Steward concession, with current and former officials from the two companies expected to face charges in the near future.

==== Police actions ====
Former deputy commissioner Silvio Valletta who had been in charge of the investigation of the murder of Daphne Caruana Galizia is under investigation due to his close connections with Yorgen Fenech and Keith Schembri. Valletta had had a meal with Fenech at his ranch and had accepted gifts of free trips to Stamford Bridge to watch a Chelsea game in September 2018 and in May 2018 to Kyiv to watch a Champions League final football match, with Yorgen Fenech, despite being aware of 17 Black from March 2018, then in November 2018 whilst on his way to the then murder suspect Yorgen Fenech's house, a phone call from Keith Schembri persuaded Valletta to cancel the visit and Valletta was unable to explain why a phone call from a politician could influence an action by the police.

In June 2018, the Constitutional Court had ordered Valletta's removal from the murder case, due to conflicts by being married to a government minister and being on the Financial Intelligence Analysis Unit board of Governors. Appealed against, he remained in the police force until losing the appeal, resigning in November 2018. His wife, Gozo Minister Justyne Caruana lost her ministerial position in January 2020 after a film emerged of Silvio Valletta inside Yorgen Fenech's Rolls-Royce. Prime Minister Robert Abela re-appointed Justyne Caruana to cabinet as Education Minister in November 2020.

Silvio Valletta was also being quizzed about inaction to investigate the Pilatus Bank/Egrant/Michelle Muscat allegations.

==== Jason Azzopardi ====
MP Jason Azzopardi is a shadow minister.

In 2017, Azzopardi accepted a free 3 day stay at the Hilton Hotel in Tel Aviv, paid for by Ray Fenech through the Tumas Group. Azzopardi gave a silver gift in return, but did not declare the gift in his 2017 annual return. Azzopardi is one of the lawyers representing the Caruana Galizia family in the case against Yorgen Fenech, the then CEO of Tumas Group. Azzopardi was investigated for a breach of the MPs' code of ethics. The Nationalist Party will reprimand him for the breach.

Azzopardi went on a live radio show on 31 October 2020 giving his opinion that Yorgen Fenech was guilty, and that Keith Schembri had done everything he could to conceal the acts, resulting in lawyers for Fenech claiming he would no longer be able to receive a fair trial and there was a conflict between Azzopardi acting as a prosecutor and as a parliamentarian. The Court decided to caution Azzopardi over his dual role and as he could not be impartial and should be more cautious when talking as a politician about on-going court cases.

== Reactions ==
An EU Parliament delegation visited Malta on 3–4 December 2019 to monitor the rule of law and to hold talks with government officials in Malta prior to a debate in the EU Parliament. By resolution, two weeks later, the European Parliament said it was deeply concerned about the integrity and credibility of the investigation into the death of Caruana Galizia, who had exposed the shady financial dealings of Maltese elite and was subsequently murdered with a car bomb in October 2017. The European Parliament then called on Malta's prime minister, Joseph Muscat, to quit immediately over his handling of the investigation into the murder of the journalist. Despite calls to cancel the meeting, Pope Francis met Joseph Muscat and his family in a private audience on 7 December 2019.

United Nations Special Rapporteurs Agnes Callamard, UN Special Rapporteur on Extrajudicial Killings and Michel Forst, UN Special Rapporteur on Human Rights Defenders called on Malta to investigate the murder of Caruana Galizia and guarantee both the independence and impartiality of the murder investigation.

== See also ==
- The Daphne Project
