= Yorgen Fenech =

Maltese man on trial for murder (born 1981)

- Born: 23 November 1981 (age 44); Pietà, Malta
- Known for: Former CEO of Tumas Group and ElectroGas

Yorgen Fenech (born 23 November 1981) is a Maltese businessman who was put on trial mid-2026 for two charges related to the murder of the journalist Daphne Caruana Galizia. At the time of her murder, Daphne was investigating the link between the offshore company 17 Black and corruption in the Electrogas project, which Fenech led. In his trial for murder, Fenech admitted he owns 17 Black. The prosecution has asked for a life sentence if Fenech is found guilty. Fenech is separately also facing multiple criminal charges for corruption, money laundering, and the illicit purchase of firearms and poison. He was head of the Tumas Group and a director of the Maltese-Azerbaijani-German company ElectroGas Malta. He is a beneficial owner of both companies and holds the controlling “golden” share in Tumas Group which owns and operates the Hilton Hotel in Malta.

Charged with bribing members of the Maltese government, in November 2019 Fenech was arrested for the murder of the investigative-journalist Daphne Caruana Galizia. He is a key figure in the 2019 Malta political crisis and 2019 protests in Malta. Fenech stands charged with complicity in murder and criminal association,and is also facing criminal proceedings relating to corruption and money laundering together with the former head of the Malta Police Force anti-money laundering unit; money laundering in connection with Glimmer Ltd of which he is a co-owner; the purchase of grenades, pistols, and poison from the dark web; and misappropriation in connection with a phantom government job given to self-confessed murder middleman, Melvin Theuma. Fenech, along with fellow ElectroGas owner Paul Apap Bologna, is also facing criminal charges over payments from his secret offshore company, 17 Black, via secret offshore financial structures to government officials identified in the Panama Papers, in connection with the Electrogas project. The charges include corruption, money laundering, trading in influence, and criminal association. Encrypted messages between Ray Aquilina, the former head of the Malta Police Force's anti-money laundering unit, and Fenech, recovered from Fenech's phone, indicated a relationship between the two at a time when the police were meant to be investigating Fenech's Dubai company 17 Black. All concerned have pleaded not guilty to all pending charges.

== Business ==
Fenech is a prominent criminal suspect. He was identified in March 2018 as being the owner of the Ajman-registered company 17 Black by the Malta Police Force, although this only became public knowledge through an investigation by Reuters and the Times of Malta in November 2018. The company was listed in the Panama Papers and investigative journalist Caruana Galizia had written about 17 Black eight months before her death, alleging the company had links to Joseph Muscat's chief of staff Keith Schembri and to former energy minister Konrad Mizzi. Later, the research group The Daphne Project came across e-mails between 17 Black and two shell companies in Panama, belonging to Mizzi or Schembri. The emails mentioned payments of up to $2 million for unspecified services. Mizzi was then Minister of Energy in Malta, Schembri Chief of Staff of Prime Minister Joseph Muscat.

Fenech was CEO of the Tumas Group and a director of energy company ElectroGas Malta; in 2019 he resigned from both positions. On 25 November 2019 Tumas Group, operators of the Malta Hilton hotel, said that allegations linking Fenech to the murder of Daphne Caruana Galizia were "alien to the Tumas Group's values". Group chair and shareholder, Raymond Fenech, and group shareholder Franco Fenech, uncle and brother to Yorgen Fenech, are both implicated in assisting his escape from Malta shortly before his arrest for murder.

== Criminal prosecution ==
=== Assassination of Daphne Caruana Galizia ===
On 16 October 2017, investigative journalist Daphne Caruana Galizia was killed in a targeted car bomb attack close to her home, attracting widespread local and international reactions. In December 2017, three men were arrested in connection with the car bomb attack. Vince Muscat pleaded guilty in exchange for a reduced sentence and turned state witness. In October 2022, Brothers Alfred Degiorgio and George Degiorgio, pleaded guilty and were sentenced to 40 years in prison. (George Degiorgio has since been condemned to life imprisonment for another murder). On 10 June 2025, Robert Agius and Jamie Vella were condemned to life imprisonment for supplying the bomb that was used to kill Daphne.

In November 2019, Prime Minister Joseph Muscat announced a deal with Melvin Theuma, the self-confessed middleman in the murder. Theuma was thought to be able to provide comprehensive information about the murder case and other crimes, and received a presidential pardon in exchange for information relating to the mastermind of the murder.

A day after Theuma's arrest, Fenech attempted to leave Malta on his private yacht, with the Armed Forces of Malta intercepting and arresting him as a "person of interest" in the Caruana Galizia murder enquiry. Fenech went on to offer himself as a witness. He promised information about the murder case and other offenses, in exchange for immunity. The request was not granted. On 30 November 2019, an indictment was filed against Fenech, and he was accused of complicity in the murder of Caruana Galizia. Fenech pleaded not guilty.

Six days after the arrest of Fenech, Keith Schembri resigned his government post as Chief of Staff, and was subsequently questioned by the police. Schembri was later released on police bail.

Yorgen Fenech's doctor, Adrian Vella, was also arrested for questioning. Vella's name also occurred in a number of companies registered or managed via Panama. He denies serving as a secret messenger between Schembri and Fenech.

Fenech, in his court statement, accused Schembri of being the mastermind behind the Caruana Galizia murder. He also claimed Keith Schembri had promised him a presidential pardon. Fenech requested a presidential pardon five times. All his requests were rejected, including a legal challenge he filed over the refused pardon. A second legal challenge failed because Fenech did not pay the court fees. His criminal defence lawyer was present. Fenech claimed Schembri tried to influence him to frame Christian Cardona for the assassination of Caruana Galizia. Fenech was denied bail more than 20 times, as the court determined that he was a flight risk. The bail decrees also cited Fenech's access to cryptocurrencies, plans to emigrate to the United States, and his attempted illicit purchase of firearms on the dark web.

On 24 January 2025, Fenech was granted bail. This decision created much controversy, with one of Caruana Galizia's sons accusing Prime Minister Robert Abela, and the Minister of Justice Jonathan Attard, to be on the side of criminals.

On 22 June 2026, Malta's constitutional court rejected Fenech's attempt to exclude his police statement from ongoing criminal proceedings, including his trial for Daphne's assassination. Fenech gave his formal statement to the police in the presence of one of his lawyers, after consulting his principal lawyer for some 20 hours. In his statement, Fenech told the police that he OK'd the execution of the plot to assassinate Daphne Caruana Galizia. The full audio visual recording of Fenech's statement was played in court during his trial.

Fenech made other self-incriminating statements. In recordings of his conversations with the murder middleman, Fenech is heard saying: “Mela jien [expletive] ħa ngħix biha fuq il-kuxjenza tiegħi li ġrat xi ħaġa. Mhux ħabba fija dak kollu li ġara?" ("So I am going to live with the burden on my conscience that something happened. Isn’t everything that happened my fault? ") and "li hemm bżonn nerfa’, m’hemmx x’tagħmel, [expletive] mhux jien għaffiġtha? M’hemmx x’tagħmel, ħeqq” ("I have to shoulder the burden, there’s no way around it. Aren’t I the one who messed things up? There’s nothing else for it.")

Fenech's trial by jury commenced on 1 July 2026 and ended on 2 September 2026. On 2 September 2026 Fenech was found not guilty of both charges related to the assassination of Caruana Galizia. The 8-1 'not guilty' verdict for complicity and criminal association, despite Fenech's self-incriminating statements, generated international media coverage and widespread shock and outrage. The prosecution is appealing the verdict.

Daphne's family members have said that they back the prosecution's appeal, calling the verdict "an abomination" and Fenech's action "evil that must be retrained" and saying that "The alternative is a country where anyone can pay to blow you up, admit it on video, and get away with it all."

=== 17 Black and corruption in Electrogas power station project ===
Yorgen Fenech is charged with corruption in the Electrogas power station project. Investigators found a complex web of transactions running into the millions between companies owned or controlled by the defendants. Fenech and his associates - Paul Apap Bologna, Konrad Mizzi, Keith Schembri, Brian Tonna, Karl Cini, Mario Pullicino - were arraigned in early February 2025. Four companies - including Yorgen Fenech's 17 Black and Paul Apap Bologna's Kittiwake - have also been charged. By 27 February 2025, the court ruled that there is enough prima facie evidence for the accused individuals and companies to face trial on money laundering charges. Police conducted three searches on Yorgen Fenech's properties in connection with his company, 17 Black. Daphne Caruana Galizia had reported on the existence of 17 Black in 2017. All accused pleaded not guilty. The case is ongoing.

=== Bribery of head of Malta Police anti-money laundering unit ===
On 15 January 2025, Yorgen Fenech was arraigned on corruption and money laundering charges relating to [alleged] bribery of the now former head of the Malta Police anti-money laundering unit, Ray Aquilina. The former police superintendent is also facing charges related to bribery and money laundering. By 12 February, the court ruled that there is enough prima facie evidence for the three accused to face trial. Aquilina was first arrested in April 2021 as part of a wider probe into police and government officials who were suspected of leaking sensitive information from the investigation into Daphne Caruana Galizia's assassination to murder suspects, including Yorgen Fenech. As part of the leaks probe, investigators had examined the planned sale of a Birżebbuġan apartment to Aquilina which Fenech was suspected of facilitating. At that stage, Aquilina was meant to be investigating Fenech over his ownership of 17 Black, a secret company suspected to have been intended to funnel payments to former government officials Konrad Mizzi and Keith Schembri. Instead of Aquilina appearing as the property buyer, the property transaction was to be fronted by his parents, who would then donate it to their son. Ray Aquilina arranged the property deal with Yorgen Fenech while he was still in the police force. Notary Mario Bugeja, who notarised the property deal, is charged with money laundering. All concerned deny wrongdoing. The criminal case is ongoing.

=== Illicit purchase of firearms and ammunition ===
On 18 August 2021, during criminal proceedings for the murder of Daphne Caruana Galizia, the court heard that Fenech had ordered cyanide powder, two hand grenades, two submachine guns and hundreds of bullets in 2018 and that the information came from emails found on Fenech's devices that showed how he paid in Bitcoin for the poison and weapons. The police investigation into Yorgen Fenech's alleged bid to purchase firearms on the dark web using cryptocurrency has targeted lawyer Aron Mifsud Bonnici, US court documents show. Yorgen Fenech was formally charged over the illicit weapons order on 26 August 2021. On 3 September 2021 the court ruled that the criminal case will continue behind closed doors. The criminal case is ongoing.

=== Political ===
Investigations for fraud and or money laundering are being undertaken on a number of business connected to Yorgen Fenech, including ElectroGas Malta.
