= Cutajar =

Cutajar is a surname. Notable people with the surname include:

- Lawrence Cutajar (born 1960), Maltese politician
- Michael Cutajar (born 1971), Maltese footballer
- Robert Cutajar, Maltese politician
- Rosianne Cutajar (born 1988/89), Maltese politician
