= Keith Schembri =

Maltese politician (born 1975)

Chief of Staff
- In office 11 March 2013 – 26 November 2019
- Prime Minister: Joseph Muscat
- Preceded by: Edgar Galea Curmi
- Succeeded by: Mark Farrugia

Personal details
- Born: 26 July 1975 (age 50) Cospicua, Malta
- Party: Partit Laburista
- Spouse: Josette Schembri Vella
- Children: 2
- Occupation: Political strategist; businessman

Keith Schembri (born 26 July 1975) is Maltese businessman and political strategist who served as chief of staff to Prime Minister Joseph Muscat from 11 March 2013 to 26 November 2019. Schembri resigned in relation to the murder investigation of Daphne Caruana Galizia and in course of the political crises in Malta. The crisis also led to unprecedented protests in Malta, which called for Schembri's resignation.

== Biography ==
In 1996, Schembri established Kasco Holdings, a group of companies providing various services and products within the fields of graphic art and engineering. The group's flagship company is Kasco Paper.

Schembri first set up an offshore shell company in January 2011.

In 2008, Joseph Muscat brought Schembri into the Labour Party. Schembri managed the 2013 electoral campaign that saw the Labour Party elected with the largest margin of victory in Malta since its independence.

Muscat won the Maltese election in 2013 and Schembri became part of his office team. In July 2013 three letterbox firms were created in Panama: Tillgate Inc. owned by Schembri, Hearnville Inc. owned by Energy-minister Konrad Mizzi and Egrant.

In June 2015, Schembri purchased Panama companies from the Mossack Fonseca-related firm ATC Administrators Inc, specifically Hearnville Inc and Tillgate Inc. Schembri asked the audit firm Nexia BT (Mossack Fonseca franchise in Malta), auditors of the Kasco Group, to help him set up a New Zealand trust and associated company. Konrad Mizzi also used Nexia for this purpose; he said Schembri suggested an overseas trust and brought him to Nexia. Rotorua, Mizzi's trust, and Haast, the trust created for Schembri, are both run by Orion Trust (New Zealand). Under New Zealand law, the trusts pay no tax on foreign earnings; New Zealand regulators may demand this information, but do not disclose it to other governments. Mossack flagged both Schembri and Mizzi as politically exposed persons due to their roles in the Maltese government, and noted "some negative coverage regarding the tender process for supply of paper to the government," and also concerns about the level of compensation received by Mizzi's wife. FPB Bank of Panama refused to open accounts for the two, judging them potential corruption risks.

Schembri was one of the Maltese individuals mentioned in the initial Panama Papers leaks in April 2016, together with then Minister for Energy and Health Konrad Mizzi. These revelations led to calls for Schembri's resignation from government. This motion was later amended by the governing party as a vote of no confidence in the Prime Minister, under whose employ Schembri falls. Parliament voted along party lines and the motion was defeated.

In December 2021, Schembri and Konrad Mizzi and their immediate family were sanctioned by the United States Department of State citing involvement in "significant corruption".

In May 2024, Schembri together with Muscat, Mizzi, and others were criminally charged with, among other things, bribery, criminal association, and money laundering in relation to Vitals Global Healthcare and the related Hospital contract controversy.

In November 2024, Schembri was criminally charged with leaking information to the people involved with the murder of journalist Caruana Galizia.

=== Involvement in the Caruana Galizia murder investigation ===
Maltese businessman Yorgen Fenech was arrested on 20 November 2019 in connection with the Daphne Caruana Galizia murder. Schembri resigned his government post on 26 November 2019, and was subsequently arrested by the police for questioning. Schembri was later released by police. Yorgen Fenech, in his court statement, accused Schembri of being the mastermind behind the Caruana Galizia murder. Schembri is also accused of trying to influence Fenech in order to frame Chris Cardona as responsible for the murder of Caruana Galizia. According to Fenech's testimony in a constitutional case, Schembri had allegedly informed Fenech that the latter's phone was being tapped.

A campaign boycotting Kasco imports was initiated; Pasta Rummo was a notable example, having been targeted in supermarkets with stickers with bloody hands being placed on the pasta packaging. Pasta Rummo distanced themselves from Schembri in an issued statement.

In 20 March 2021, Schembri was charged with corruption, fraud, and money laundering. He was denied bail and taken to Corradino Correctional Facilities (Jail). He was subsequently released on bail after being denied twice.

In May 2024, Schembri was again charged with, among other things, bribery, criminal association, and money laundering in relation to Vitals Global Healthcare and the related Hospital contract controversy (see above).

In November 2024, Schembri was criminally charged with leaking information to the people involved with the murder of journalist Caruana Galizia (see above).
