= Lawrence Cutajar =

Maltese policeman

Lawrence Cutajar (born 5 March 1960 in Luqa) is a Maltese policeman, and served as commissioner of the Malta Police Force from 2016 to 2020.

== Biography ==
Cutajar read for a Diploma in Law and Administration at the University of Malta. In February 1979 he joined the Malta Police Force as a Constable. He was promoted to the rank of Sergeant in September 1983, before graduating as an Inspector a year later. Cutajar achieved the rank of Superintendent in 2000.

Throughout his career, Cutajar worked mainly in district policing, serving also with other sections of the Police such as the Command and Control Room, Airport Security, Vice Squad and Intelligence.

In February 2014, Cutajar was appointed Assistant Commissioner in charge of the Police Immigration Branch. On 27 April 2016 he was promoted to head the Police as Acting Commissioner. On 1 August 2016 Prime Minister Joseph Muscat officially appointed him as Commissioner of Police.

Following the handling of Egrant and Pilatus Bank investigations since 2016, Cutajar was called on to resign by opposition and civil society groups multiple times. He claimed that the only time he thought about resigning was when a police constable was grievously injured in a hit-and-run incident in 2018. He declared himself proud of the low levels of crime in Malta.

As a result of the 2019 Malta political crisis and at the request of the new prime Minister Robert Abela, Cutajar announced his resignation on 17 January 2020.

On the day of his resignation as commissioner, Lawrence Cutajar signed a contract to become a part time consultant with the Home Affairs Ministry at a salary of €31,040 p.a., compared to his previous full time salary of €37,946 as police commissioner. The consultancy contract was terminated in June 2020 after revelations in court linked to Yorgen Fenech and the Daphne Caruana Galizia murder.

Cutajar is the recipient of the Long and Efficient Service medal with two clasps, denoting more than 37 years of active police service. He is married with two children.
