= Vitals Global Healthcare =

Defunct Maltese healthcare company

- Company type: Private
- Industry: Healthcare
- Defunct: 2018
- Fate: Acquired by Steward Health Care
- Successor: Steward Health Care
- Website: vitalshealthcare.com

Vitals Global Healthcare (VGH) was a healthcare company based in Malta. It managed public–private partnerships and worked with Barts and The London School of Medicine and Dentistry.

== Hospital contract controversy ==
In 2014 it "formulated a bid for the management and administration of a number of hospitals in the Maltese Islands". In November 2015, the company was given the contract by Maltese authorities. The choice of giving the contract to VGH was controversial, as the company had only formed recently and did not have any experience managing health care facilities. The contract terms were also considered biased with the government having to bail out VGH if it got into debt and it would cost €100 million plus pay company debts to buy the contract back. By the end of 2017, the company was deeply in debt, even though it had been paid 52.7 million euros by the Maltese government. In 2017 VGH was paid €75 million to run the hospitals, but incurred costs of €94 million, resulting in a loss of €18 million, up from a loss of €6 million in 2016.

VGH was being investigated by investigative journalist Daphne Caruana Galizia before her murder in October 2017. Three Maltese Government Ministers at the time, Edward Scicluna, Chris Cardona and Konrad Mizzi, face investigation regarding VGH taking control of the three hospitals under a contract to last for 30 years in 2015.

== Ownership ==
VGH ownership was said to be the "Bluestone Group" however it now appears it was controlled by the Bluestone Special Situations #4 Limited (BVI) which in turn is owned by BVI company Asia Harimau Investments Ltd which is owned by Mark Edward Pawley, a senior advisor to Oxley Capital Group.

Other parties received share option agreements granting them rights to percentages of shares in VGH without showing up as owners of VGH.

When VGH Malta was created, an identically named company was established in Jersey, together with 11 other companies, Sri Ram Tumuluri is named as an investor who created the Jersey companies. The Jersey companies included ones designed to support a bid for a similar style VGH hospital projects in Kosovo and Montenegro.

VGH was sold to Steward Global Healthcare in January 2018 for a nominal €1, the sale precipitated a doctors' strike. VGH received €50 million from the Maltese government to allow the sale to go through.

== See also ==
- 2019 Malta political crisis
