= The Daphne Project =

International investigative journalism project

The Daphne Project is a collaborative, cross-border investigative journalism project by major news organizations from around the world, coordinated by Paris-based investigative non-profit newsroom, Forbidden Stories, to continue the work of Maltese investigative journalist Daphne Caruana Galizia. Their work has been facilitated through the Organized Crime and Corruption Reporting Project (OCCRP), a member of Global Investigative Journalism Network. They published their first in a series of reports in April 2018.

== Background ==
On April 17, 2018, Forbidden Stories launched The Daphne Project by publishing the first of a series of reports by a consortium of 45 journalists from 18 news outlets to complete Caruana Galizia's investigative work. The Daphne Project journalists "work to unpack the circumstances of Caruana Galizia’s murder and expose the web of corruption in Malta that made it possible".

== Publications ==
Laurent Richard's article "A warning to the corrupt: if you kill a journalist, another will take their place", was published in The Guardian on April 16, 2018. It was the first in the series and Richard's message was to let "those who tried to halt Daphne Caruana Galizia’s work in Malta" know that they failed.

On April 17, The New York Times published a lengthy article, "In Journalist's Murder, a Test for Malta, and the European Union", citing a European Parliament report, "The brutal assassination of Daphne Caruana Galizia was aimed at instilling fear in everyone, especially those involved in investigating and prosecuting cases of money laundering and corruption." The Times described Galizia as, "[h]ated by many but read by all, her post about [Malta's economy minister, Christian Cardona] had 547,146 page views; Malta has 460,000 people."

Reuters in-depth April 17 publication entitled "The silencing of Daphne", included a production crew with photography and video. Reuters cited European Union parliament member, Ana Gomes, who led an EU mission to Malta in 2016, to "examine the rule of law and progress on preventing money-laundering". She said, "The culture of impunity in Malta ... fosters corruption, organised financial criminality and state capture. And it was that culture that created the conditions for the murder of Daphne Caruana Galizia."

In their November 9, 2018, OCCRP article, Reuters journalists, Stephen Grey and Tom Arnold, revealed that Reuters and The Daphne Project had obtained documents showing details about 17 Black Limited, a company that Galizia had mentioned in her blog eight months before she was killed. (Note: Grey and Arnold wrote in their November 9, 2018, OCCRP article that, according to a Dubai bank and UAE banking correspondence, Yorgen Fenech was owner of 17 Black. In 2013, the Maltese government granted a contract worth 450 million euros ($517 million) to build a gas power station on Malta.) The documents showed that Konrad Mizzi—Malta's energy minister from 2013 to 2016—and the Prime Minister's Chief of Staff, Keith Schembri, "owned two Panamanian companies and expected to get payments from an offshore company connected" to Yorgen Fenech, CEO of Tumas Group, that had won a large Malta government concession to build a multi-million dollar gas power plant on Malta. Mizzi, Schembri, and Fenech deny any wrongdoing. This story was confirmed by The Malta Independent.

== Members ==
Most Daphne Project journalists have also worked with International Consortium of Investigative Journalists (ICIJ) or the Organized Crime and Corruption Reporting Project (OCCRP), a global network of investigative journalists. They have worked with major news outlets, such as Reuters, The Guardian, The New York Times, Le Monde, the Times of Malta, and "top papers in France, Italy, and Germany", a collaborative effort to complete Caruana Galizia's investigative work.

Pulitzer Prize-winning German investigative journalist Bastian Obermayer with the Munich-based newspaper Süddeutsche Zeitung (SZ), helped found the Forbidden Stories platform and serves as vice president. (Note: It was Obermayer who received the Panama Papers from an anonymous source. According to an April 4, 2016 Wired article, Obermayer said, "that the source contacted him via encrypted chat, offering some sort of data intended 'to make these crimes public.' But the source warned that his or her 'life is in danger,' was only willing to communicate via encrypted channels, and refused to meet in person.")

== Sponsors ==
Sponsors include the Open Society Foundations (OSF), USAID, Swiss-Romanian Cooperation Programme, International Center for Journalists (ICFJ), and the Sigrid Rausing Trust.

== Popular culture ==
In Venice on August 30, 2019, Meryl Streep, who has the lead role in Steven Soderbergh's The Laundromat, which is about Mossack Fonseca, praised the investigative reporting of Daphne Caruana Galizia. Streep said that even though The Laundromat is a dark comedy, it will draw attention to the work of "about 300 international investigative reporters who broke the story in 2016". She said, "People died and people die still to get the word out. This movie is fun and it’s funny but it’s really, really, really important." In the film, which premiered on September 1 in Venice, Streep's character is a Texan widow who inadvertently exposes the directors of Mossack Fonseca as she seeks answers about her late husband's savings. Jürgen Mossack is played in the film by Gary Oldman, and Antonio Banderas plays Ramón Fonseca. Soderbergh's inspiration for the dark comedy was Stanley Kubrick's 1964 Dr. Strangelove, a political satire about the Cold War and nuclear arms race between the Soviet Union and the United States. Soderbergh said that, "a dark comedy would have the best possible chance of remaining in the minds of the viewers and also gave us the opportunity to use the complexity of these kind of financial activities almost as a joke, almost as a setup for a punchline. Otherwise viewers would feel as if they were being educated as opposed to entertained."
