= Chris Cardona =

Maltese politician and lawyer

The Honourable Christian Cardona
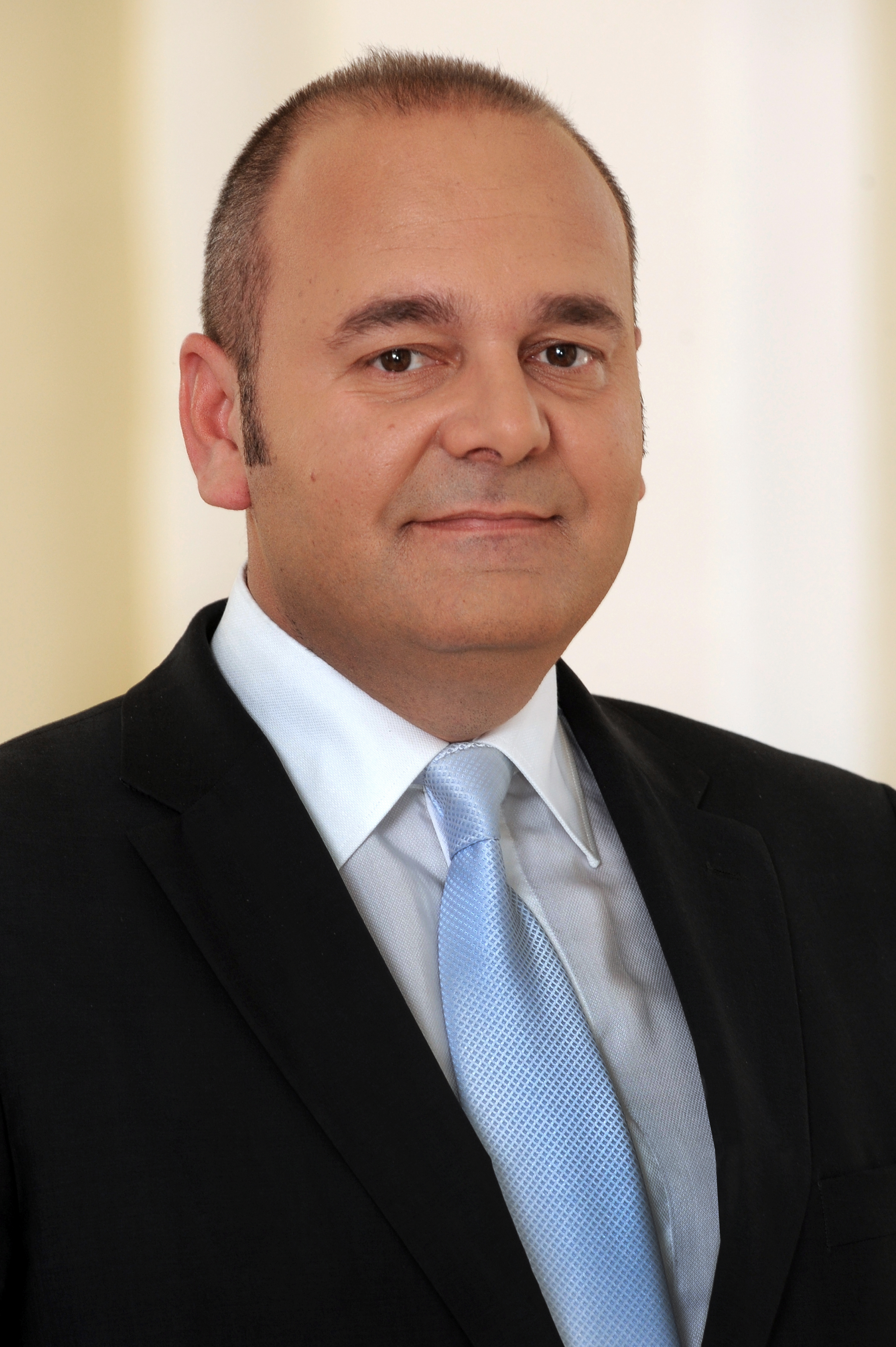

Minister for the Economy, Investment and Small Business
- In office 11 March 2013 – 15 January 2020
- Prime Minister: Joseph Muscat
- Succeeded by: Silvio Schembri

Deputy Leader of the Labour Party Party Affairs
- In office 12 June 2016 – 17 June 2020
- Preceded by: Konrad Mizzi

Member of Parliament
- In office 1 November 1996 – 30 April 2020

Personal details
- Born: 1972 (age 53–54)
- Party: Labour Party
- Education: University of Malta; International Maritime Organization
- Website: economy.gov.mt

Christian Cardona (born 1972) is a Maltese former politician and lawyer. He was a Member of Parliament for the Maltese Labour Party and was elected Deputy Leader for Party Affairs in 2016. He served as Malta's Minister for the Economy, Investment and Small Business between 2013 and 2020.

== Biography ==
Cardona was born in 1972 and graduated as Notary Public and Doctor of Laws from the University of Malta. He furthered his studies in international maritime law at the United Nations' International Maritime Organization where he obtained a first Class master's degree in shipping law. Cardona is the author of the thesis entitled United Nations Commission on International Trade Law – A Maltese Perspective.

He was first elected to Parliament in 1996 and was re-elected in the 1998, 2003, 2008 and 2013 general elections. In 2008, he contested the post of Deputy Leader for Parliamentary Affairs of the Labour Party. In 2013, he has been elected by the Labour Party's delegates as Deputy Leader for Party Affairs.

During the 2008 – 2013 legislature he served as the Labour Party main Spokesperson for the Industry, Self Employed and Foreign Investment. In previous legislatures he served as the Labour Party Spokesperson for Competition, Communication and IT. Cardona also served as a member in the Malta EU Parliamentary Committee during the negotiation process of Malta’s application to join the European Union as a full member.

Prior to his appointment as Minister for the Economy, Investment and Small Business, Cardona was a senior partner at law firm CV Advocates.

On 11 June 2016, Cardona won the deputy leadership race, succeeding Konrad Mizzi as Deputy Leader for Party affairs of the Labour Party.

In January 2017, investigative journalist Daphne Caruana Galizia alleged that, while in Germany on official government business, Cardona visited a brothel with his aide Joe Gerada. Both Cardona and Gerada denied the claims and instituted legal action in the form of libel suits, however before the case was decided in court, Carauna Galizia was killed in a car bomb attack.

=== Involvement in 2019 Malta political crisis ===
During the height of the 2019 Malta political crisis Cardona suspended himself as a minister in November 2019, in the context of the arrest of Yorgen Fenech and Keith Schembri he was later reinstated in December 2019 by Joseph Muscat as minister.

Cardona, along with former Health Minister Konrad Mizzi and Finance Minister Edward Scicluna, is the subject of a criminal inquiry over the deal with Vitals Global Healthcare.

=== 2020 resignation ===
The change in Prime Minister to Robert Abela in January 2020 saw Chris Cardona excluded from the position of Minister in the new government, resigning as an MP in April, but continued as Deputy Labour Leader until in June 2020 when Abela asked him to resign due to ongoing police and court revelations regarding the murder of Daphne Caruana Galizia.
