= Immediate family =

Term for the closest family relatives

The immediate family is a defined group of relations, used in rules or laws to determine which members of a person's family are affected by those rules. It normally includes a person's parents, siblings, spouse, children, and parents-in-law after marriage. It can contain others connected by birth, adoption, marriage, civil partnership, or cohabitation, such as grandparents, grandchildren, aunts, uncles, siblings-in-law, half-siblings, cousins, adopted children, step-parents/step-children, and cohabiting partners. The term close relatives is used similarly.

The concept of "immediate family" acknowledges that a person has or may feel particular responsibilities towards family members, which may make it difficult to act fairly towards non-family (hence the refusal of many companies to employ immediate family members of current employees), or which call for special allowance to recognise this responsibility (such as compensation on death, or permission to leave work to attend a funeral). It is used by travel insurance policies to determine a set of people on the basis of whose health someone might need to cancel a journey or return early. The concept is used by some countries' inheritance laws.

== Definitions ==
The exact meaning of "immediate family" varies, and will sometimes be defined in legislation or rules for a particular purpose. This can change over time: in 2005 the Scottish Government proposed to change the definition for purposes of compensation payments after deaths. The definition was to be expanded from "a remaining spouse, sexual cohabitant, partner, step-parent or step-child, parent-in-law or child-in-law, or an individual related by blood whose close association is an equivalent of a family relationship who was accepted by the deceased as a child of his/her family" to include "any person who had accepted the deceased as a child of the family, the brother or sister of the deceased, any person brought up in the same household as a child and who was him/herself accepted as a child of the family, the same sex partner of the deceased, or any person who was the grandparent or grandchild of the deceased". In California, for purposes of subdivision of Labor Code Section 2066, "immediate family member" means spouse, domestic partner, cohabitant, child, stepchild, grandchild, parent, stepparent, mother-in-law, father-in-law, son-in-law, daughter-in-law, grandparent, great grandparent, brother, sister, half-brother, half-sister, stepsibling, brother-in-law, sister-in-law, aunt, uncle, niece, nephew, or first cousin (that is, a child of an aunt or uncle).

The Missouri Code of State Regulations, 19 CSR 15-7.021 (18) (H) states that "an immediate family member is defined as a parent; sibling; child by blood, adoption, or marriage; spouse; grandparent or grandchild."

The Australian Fair Work Act 2009, Section 12, defines immediate family as "a spouse, de facto partner, child, parent, grandparent, grandchild or sibling of the employee; or a child, parent, grandparent or sibling of a spouse or de facto partner of the employee.", and "the definition of the term ‘de facto partner’ includes a former de facto partner."

A travel insurance policy which covers curtailment due to the death or illness of a member of the policy-holder's "immediate family" uses a wide definition but adds residential requirements: "Immediate Family is your Partner, and: parents, children, stepchildren, fostered or adopted children, brothers, sisters, aunts, uncles, cousins, nephews, nieces, grandchildren, or grandparents, of either you or your Partner, who live in your Home Country." and "Partner is your spouse or someone of either sex with whom you have a permanent relationship, and who also lives with you at your Home."

In the United States, where health care costs are high, immediate family members typically purchase travel medical insurance plans for relatives or parents visiting USA, to cover health care costs due to sickness or injury while they are visiting them outside their home country.

== Wills and inheritance ==
In the United States, there are many rules and rights surrounding immediate family members after a family death. If the will names a non-immediate family member to be the executor of the will, he or she cannot have an "official role in these matters". Even if a person is not a joint owner, if they are an immediate family member a bank is likely to give them access to the deceased's safety deposit box. Some states that enforce no-contest provisions do not enforce them against immediate family members. In some states, the immediate family may receive a family allowance – a court-ordered amount paid to them from estate funds to provide help for living expenses. They may also entitled to homestead allowance – an amount of equity in the family home. In many states, household goods (sentimental but not expensive goods) can be passed onto immediate family members without probate.

In France, beneficiaries are almost always immediate family members.

Generally, the distribution to the immediate family leaves the spouse with the third or a half of the property and the issue with the balance. Usually, the pattern was to leave the entire estate to one's immediate family or other relatives, thereby "preserving the family as a significant social unit". The willing to other people or institutions is associated with either a wealth or an absence of an immediate family. If there is an absence of an immediate family, the testator is given the freedom to diverge from the usual distribution of property and wealth.

== Workforce ==
In some cases, a company will not employ an immediate family member of a current employee. Sometimes, "authorized" absence due to the death of one's immediate family member allows an employee to still be eligible for an attendance bonus. In these cases, the company the employee belongs to will acknowledge the significance of the absence and will, for example, be granted 3 working days off between the day of death and the day after the burial inclusive. Full-time workers can apply for bereavement leave, and part-time or temporary employees can apply for leave without pay.

== Independence ==
Rules may specify that a person may not hold a particular office if they, "or any member of their immediate family" do not meet particular criteria. For example, a director of a NYSE company must be independent: neither they nor their family members may have been an executive officer of the company within the past 3 years, received more than $100,000 in direct compensation from the company in the past 3 years, or been employed as an executive officer of another firm within the past 3 years.

== See also ==
- Blended family
- Extended family
