= Malta Police Force =

Law enforcement agency

Malta Police Il-Korp tal-Pulizija ta’ Malta
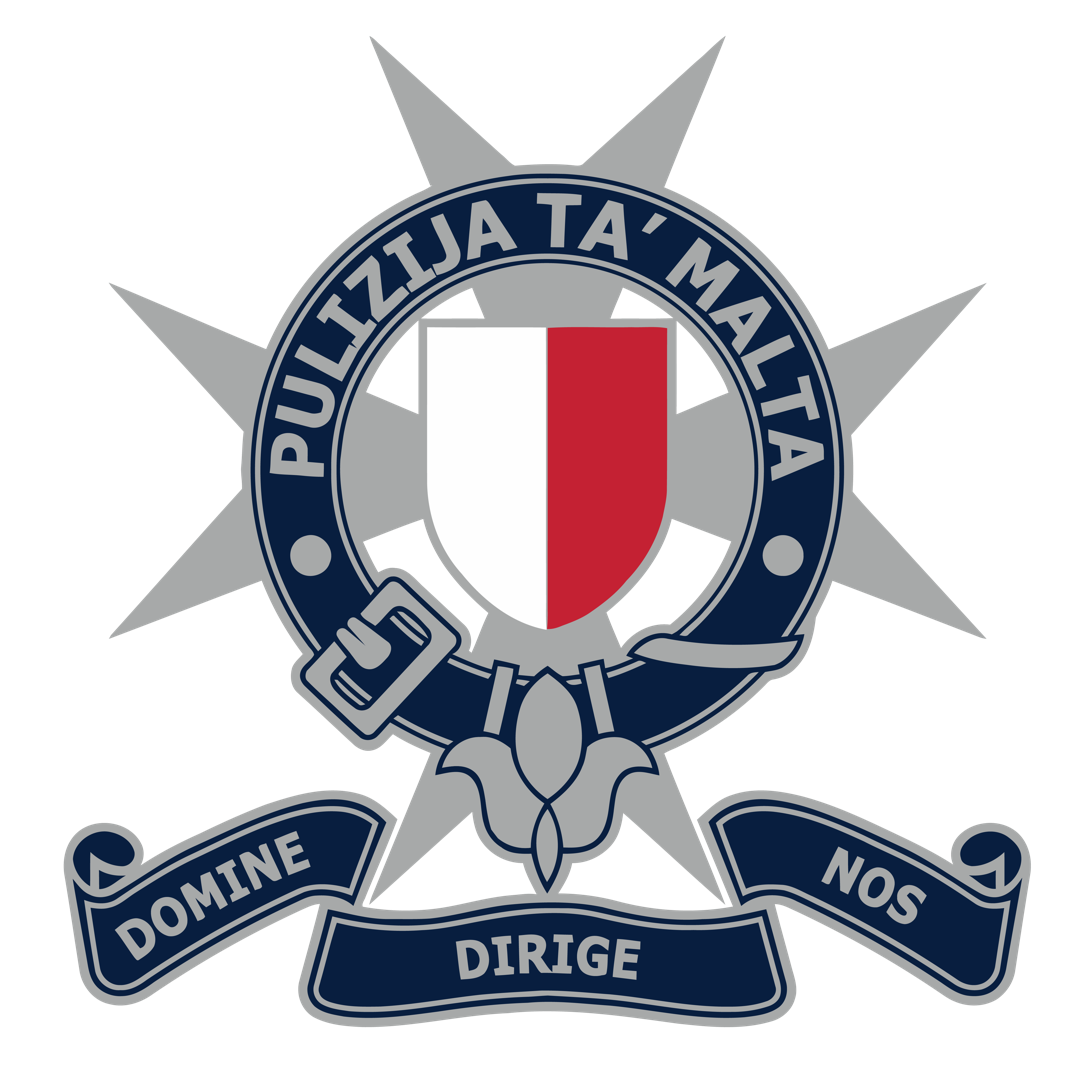
- Malta Police Force Logo

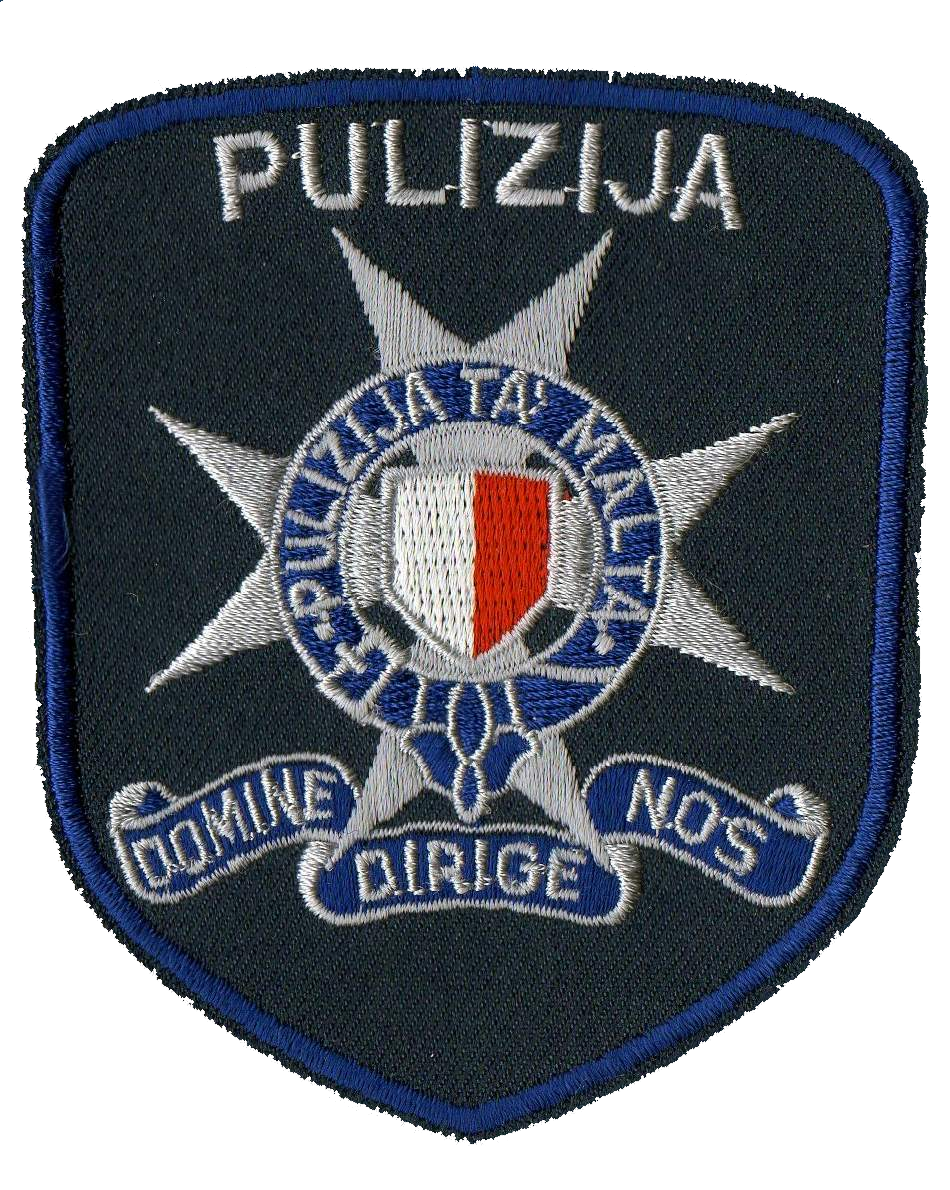
- Official Insignia

- Flag of the Malta Police Force
- Common name: Il-Pulizija
- Motto: Domine Dirige Nos; Lord Guide Us

Agency overview
- Formed: 12 July 1814; 212 years ago
- Annual budget: €76,480,000 (2020)

Jurisdictional structure
- National agency (Operations jurisdiction): Malta
- Operations jurisdiction: Malta
- Map of Malta Police's jurisdiction
- Area: 316 km²
- Population: 475,700
- Legal jurisdiction: As per operations jurisdiction
- Constituting instrument: Police Act, 2017 (Act No. XVIII of 2017)
- General nature: Civilian police

Operational structure
- Headquarters: Police General Headquarters, Pjazza San Kalcidonju, Floriana FRN 1530, Malta
- Police Officers: 2,400 (2020)
- Civilians: 102 (2018)
- Minister responsible: Glenn Bedingfield, Minister For Home Affairs & Security
- Agency executive: Angelo Gafa, Commissioner Of Police
- Parent agency: Ministry for Home Affairs & Security

Notables
- Anniversary: 12 July

Website
- pulizija.gov.mt
- Emergency Telephone Number 112; Crime Stop Line 119

The Malta Police Force (Maltese: Il-Korp tal-Pulizija ta’ Malta) is the national police force of the Republic of Malta. It falls under the responsibility of the Ministry for Home Affairs & Security, and its objectives are set out in The Police Act, Chapter 164 of the Laws of Malta.

As of 2020, the force is made up of around 2,400 members.

== Organisation ==
The duty of the executive police is to preserve public order and peace, to prevent and to detect and investigate offences, to collect evidence and to bring the offenders, whether principals or accomplices, before the judicial authorities.

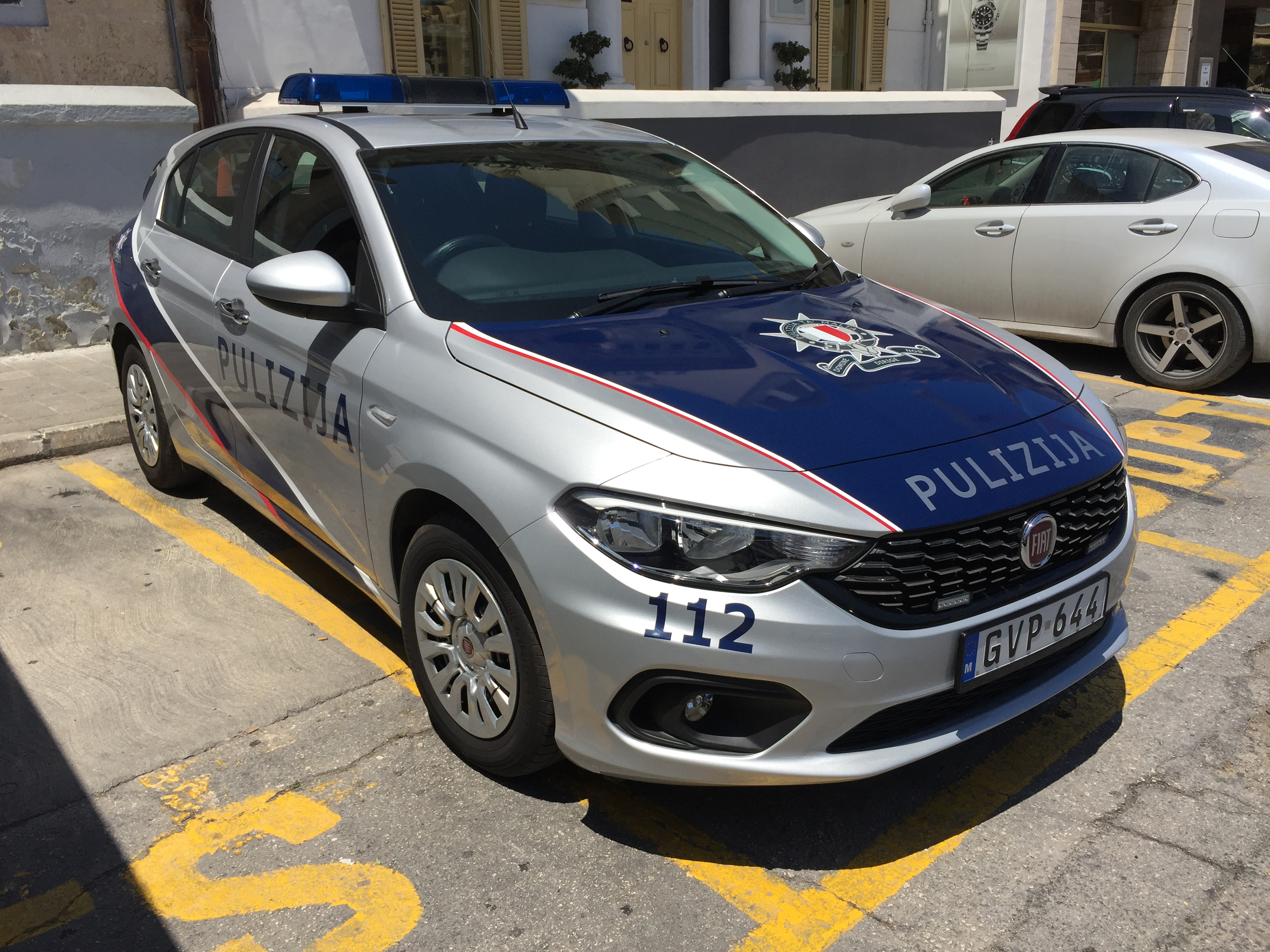
Police District Vehicles

Specialised Branches:

- Anti-Money Laundering
- Community Policing
- Counter Terrorism Unit (CTU)
- Criminal Intelligence & Analysis Unit (CIAU)
- Cyber Crime Unit (CCU)
- Domestic Violence Unit (DSQ)
- Drugs Squad (DSQ)
- Economic Crimes
- Environment Protection Unit (EPU)
- Gender-Based & Domestic Violence (GBDV)
- Homicide
- Immigration
- International Relations Unit (IRU)
- K9 Section
- Major Crimes (CID)
- Mounted Section
- Rapid Intervention Unit (RIU)
- Special Intervention Unit (SIU)
- Stolen Vehicle Squad (SVS)
- Traffic
- Vice Squad (VSQ)
- Victim Support Unit (VSU)

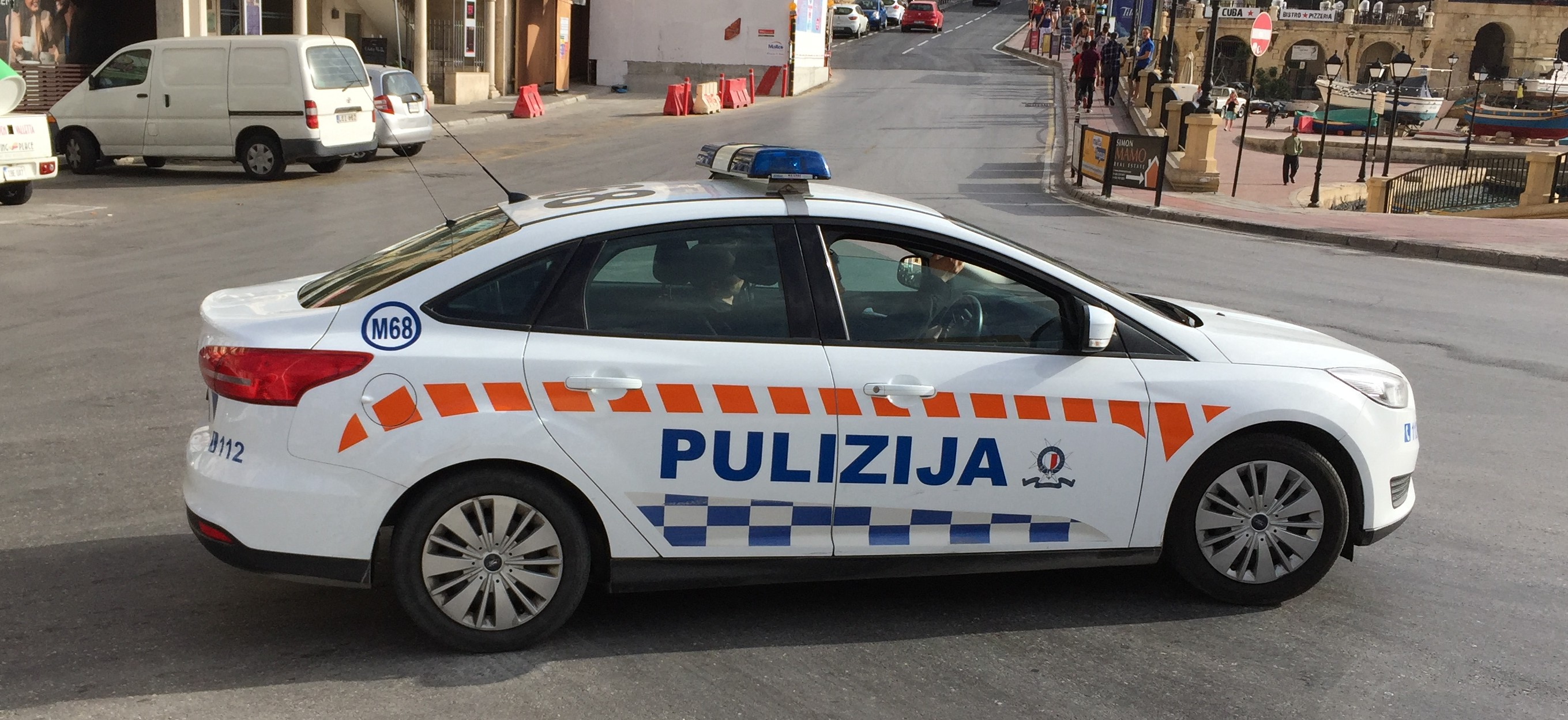
Rapid Intervention Unit Vehicles

=== Ranks ===
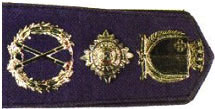
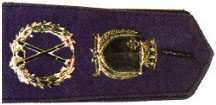
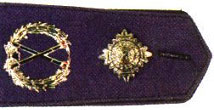
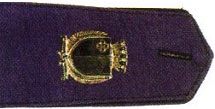
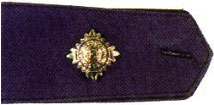
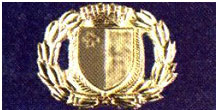
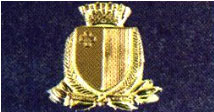
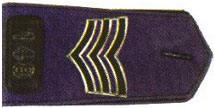
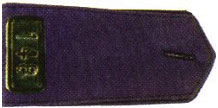
Insignia	Name	English
	Kummissarju	Commissioner of police
	Deputat Kummissarju	Deputy commissioner
	Assistent Kummissarju	Assistant commissioner
	Supretendent	Superintendent
	Spettur	Inspector
	Surġent Maġġur I	Sergeant major I
	Surġent Maġġur II	Sergeant major II
	Surġent	Police sergeant
	Kuntistabbli	Police constable

== History ==
The Malta Police Force is one of the oldest police forces in Europe. In its present form, it dates from a proclamation during the governorship of Sir Thomas Maitland (1813–1814). When Malta became a crown colony of the United Kingdom by the Treaty of Paris, Maitland was appointed Governor and commander-in-chief of Malta and its dependencies by the Prince Regent's Commission of 23 July 1813. On his appointment Maitland, embarked on many far reaching reforms, including the maintenance of law and order.

By Proclamation XXII of 1 July 1814, Maitland ordered and directed that all powers up to then exercised with respect to the administration of the police of the island of Malta and its dependencies were to be administered by the authorities under established procedures, after 12 July 1814.

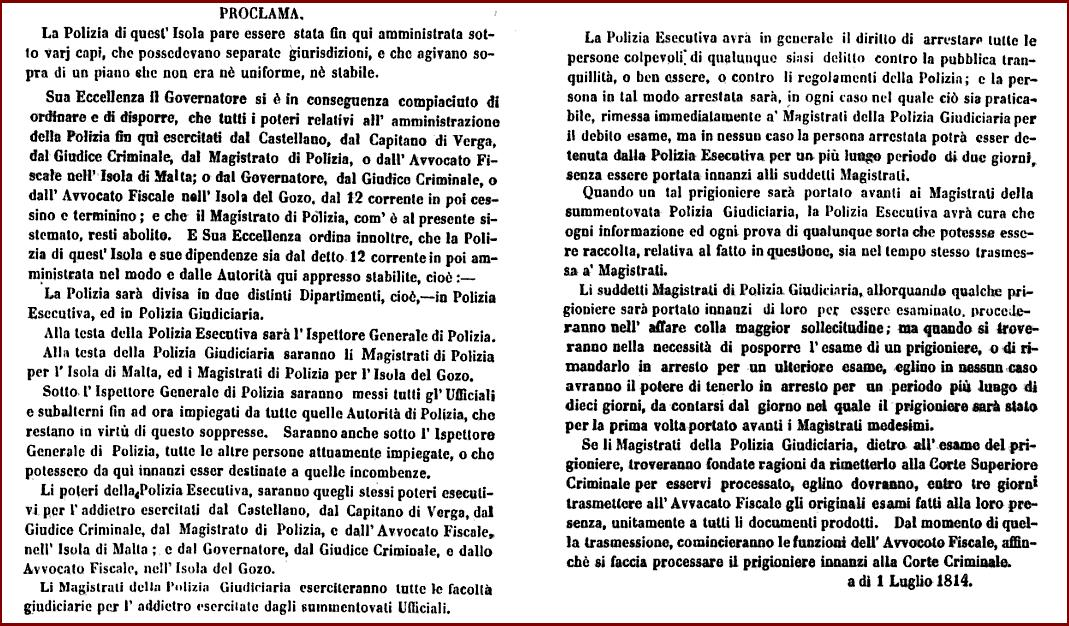
Proclamation XXII of 1 July 1814

The police was to be divided into two distinct departments – the executive police and the judicial. The inspector general of police (nowadays the commissioner of police) was to be the head of the executive police, and received orders from the governor. The magistrates of police for Malta and for Gozo were to be the heads of the judicial police.

After the grant of self-government in 1921, the police department became the responsibility of the Maltese government. The first minister appointed, who was responsible for justice and the police, was Dr Alfredo Caruana Gatto.

== General headquarters ==
The Police Depot, as it is known today, was built by the Portuguese Grand Master Manoel De Vilhena in 1734 and first served as the Casa D'Industria, a home for homeless women. They were taught basic skills and education such as reading, writing and some trades like weaving, carding and processing cotton.

In 1850, during the British occupation period, this building was used as the General Hospital. Beneath this building, a shelter was dug at the beginning of the Second World War in order to tend to wounded patients who could not be easily moved from one place to another. This space therefore provided a safer environment for patients during air bombardments. This is not only the only shelter in the Maltese Islands used for this function, there is no known underground hospital on the continent that was built or dug out to operate in this way.

The Police Force moved into this building in 1954 and turned it into its General Headquarters, from where it still operates today.

== Police museum ==
The museum is divided into two sections: each section is housed in a separate hall. The first section deals with the administrative history of the force and the second part is about some of the criminal cases.

The first hall includes various objects and belongings, for example uniforms, badges, medals, decorations, weapons, tools and vehicles used by the Police Force in the performance of its duties.

In the second hall one can see made-up scenes of crimes that have happened in Malta.

== Police commissioners ==
- Col Francesco Rivarola (1814–1822)
- Lt Col Henry Balneavis (1822–1832)
- Charles Godfrey (1832–1844)
- Frederick Sedley (1845–1858)
- Hector Zimelli (1858–1869)
- Raffaele Bonello (1869–1880)
- Col Attillo Sceberras (1880–1884)
- Capt. Richard Casolani, RMFA (1884–1888)
- Melitone Caruana (1888–1890)
- Comm. Hon. Clement La Primaudaye, MVO., RN (1890–1903)
- Tancred Curmi (1903–1915)
- Claude W. Duncan (1916–1919)
- Col Henry W. Bamford, OBE (1919–1922)
- Antonio Busuttil (1922–1923)
- Mjr Frank Stivala (1923–1928)
- Captain Salvatore Galea (1928–1939)
- Lt Col Gustavus S. Brander, OBE (1930–1932)
- Joseph Axisa (1939–1947)
- Joseph Ullo (1947–1951)
- Herbert Grech, CVO (1951–1954)
- George Cachia, L.P. (1954–1956)
- Vivian Byres de Gray, MVO., MBE., BEM (1956–1971)
- Comm. Alfred J. Bencini (1971–1973)
- Edward Bencini (1973–1974)
- Enoch Tonna (1974–1977)
- John N. Cachia (1977–1980)
- Dr Lawrence Pullicino, LL.D. (1980–1987)
- Bgdr. John Spiteri, AFM (1987–1988)
- Alfred A. Calleja (1988-1992)
- George Grech (1992–2001)
- John Rizzo (2001–2013)
- Peter Paul Zammit, L.P. (2013–2014)
- Michael Cassar (2014–2016)
- Lawrence Cutajar (2016–2020)
- Angelo Gafa (2020–)
