= Konrad Mizzi =

Maltese politician

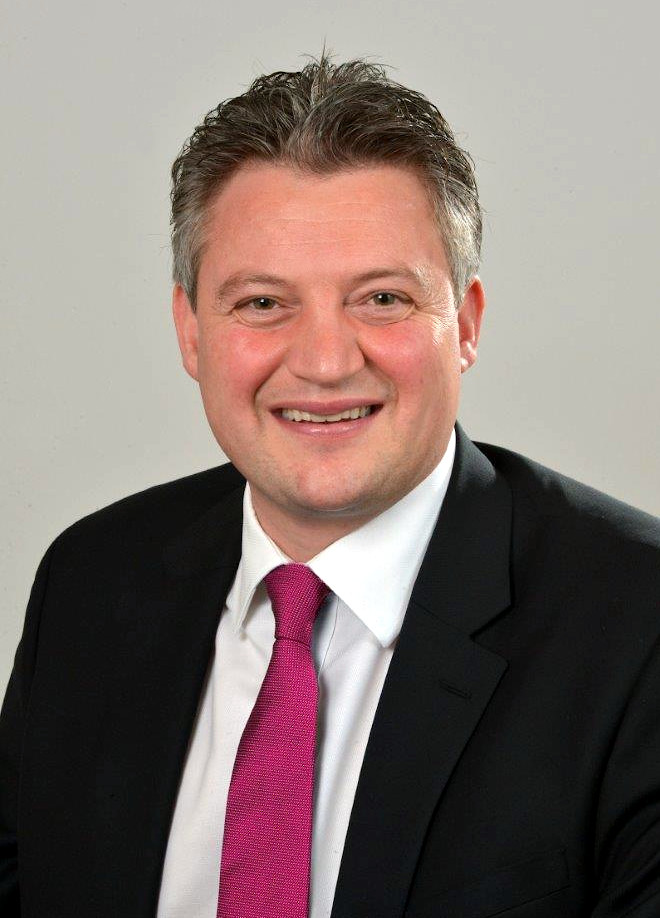

Minister of Tourism
- In office 9 June 2017 – 26 November 2019
- Prime Minister: Joseph Muscat
- Preceded by: Edward Zammit Lewis
- Succeeded by: Julia Farrugia Portelli

Minister within the Office of the Prime Minister
- In office 28 April 2016 – 3 June 2017

Minister of Energy and Health
- In office 1 April 2014 – 28 April 2016
- Prime Minister: Joseph Muscat
- Preceded by: Godfrey Farrugia
- Succeeded by: Chris Fearne

Minister of Energy and Water Conservation
- In office 13 March 2013 – 28 April 2016
- Prime Minister: Joseph Muscat
- Preceded by: Position Established
- Succeeded by: Joe Mizzi

Member of Parliament
- In office 13 March 2013 – 26 March 2022

Personal details
- Born: 4 November 1977 (age 48) Paola, Malta
- Party: Labour Party (2013-2020)
- Spouse: Sai Mizzi Liang
- Education: University of Malta; University of Nottingham

Konrad Mizzi (born 4 November 1977) is a Maltese politician and served as a Member of Parliament until 2022. He served as Minister for Energy and the Conservation of Water between 2013 and 2014, Minister for Energy and Health from 2014 until 2016, and as a Minister within the Office of the Prime Minister in April 2016.

Mizzi was re-elected on 3 June 2017 by four times as many votes as the 2013 election. He was then appointed by Prime Minister Joseph Muscat to serve as the Minister for Tourism from 9 June 2017 until his 2019 resignation.

== Early life ==
=== Education and family ===
Mizzi was educated at the De La Salle College and completed his sixth form at the Paolino Vassallo Upper Lyceum. He graduated at the University of Malta, reading for Undergraduate degree, and then furthered his education with a post-graduate studies at the University of Nottingham, where he achieved his Masters in Strategic Management. He furthered his education with a Doctorate at the University of Nottingham. Mizzi was awarded a Chevening Scholarship from the Foreign and Commonwealth Office in the United Kingdom and holds a Diploma in Finance.

=== Career before joining politics ===
Mizzi has led major projects and initiatives across different sectors including public, infrastructure, telecommunications and enterprise promotion.

Mizzi was a Partner and Head of the Energy and Infrastructure Practice for the EMEA Region (Europe, Middle East and Africa) with Pcubed, a global leader in programme management. He has previously held senior roles with Deloitte and Touche and British Telecom (Programme Director) in the United Kingdom. In the United Kingdom Mizzi led various change projects which included the forging of an Alliance between seven energy companies which improved services and realised large savings. He worked with Regional Government leaders of which aim was to improve deprived areas.

He was a member of a team which established the Malta Enterprise. He was a consultant to the Office of the Prime Minister where he led a number of projects which, included the first public-private partnership to improve landscaping of the main roads in Malta. Mizzi held the post of Chief Information Officer at Enemalta at the age of 26.

== Politics ==
Mizzi was elected in the Maltese Parliament from the Fourth District (Paola, Gudja, Ghaxaq, Tarxien, Santa Lucija and parts of Marsa and Fgura) in March 2013. He was re-elected in the 2017 election from the same district.

=== 2013 general election ===
Mizzi was appointed by the President, on advice of the Prime Minister Joseph Muscat, as Minister for Energy and the Conservation of Water on 13 March 2013 following the 2013 general elections. On 1 April 2014, Mizzi was given the responsibility for the Health and Energy portfolio. On 28 April 2016, his position was changed to Minister within the Office of the Prime Minister. This gave him the responsibility to carry out high-profile projects.

=== 2017 general election ===
After the 2017 election, Mizzi was then appointed Minister for Tourism. Immediately in his new role, he has set out an ambitious business and growth strategy for Air Malta, which builds on its current strengths including punctuality and good service. In view of this, Air Malta operates regular flights and will continue to increase their frequency to the region's key airports. One of the clear examples of decisions taken by the new Air Malta board appointed by Minister Konrad Mizzi, was the immediate re-introduction of the Frankfurt route. The Minister made it also clear that Air Malta will be introducing new routes, and announced an increase in its fleet as part of the new commercial strategy being adopted. The Minister together with Air Malta will in the coming months negotiate collective agreements, which will provide the airline with more flexibility that is required for growth and will also be fair to its employees. Mizzi resigned from the cabinet on 26 November 2019, and was voted out of the Labour parliamentary group on 23 June 2020.

== Minister for Energy and Health ==
=== Energy ===
==== Electricity tariffs ====
Upon assuming office, as the Minister for Energy, Mizzi started implementing the Government's energy plan with the primary aim of reducing utility tariffs. Following this implementation the government is calculated to have injected about €80 million in the national economy. Previously utility tariffs in Malta were considered amongst the highest tariffs in Europe, and following the reductions utility tariffs become the fourth cheapest in the European Union. This measure enabled the local industry to become more competitive.

This saw the transformation of the energy in Malta, contrasting with the situation when Mizzi was given the responsibility when Enemalta was close to declare bankruptcy, with €840 million in debt and was consecutively downgraded by Standard & Poor's. This affecting the credit ratings of the country at the time.

==== Enemalta ====
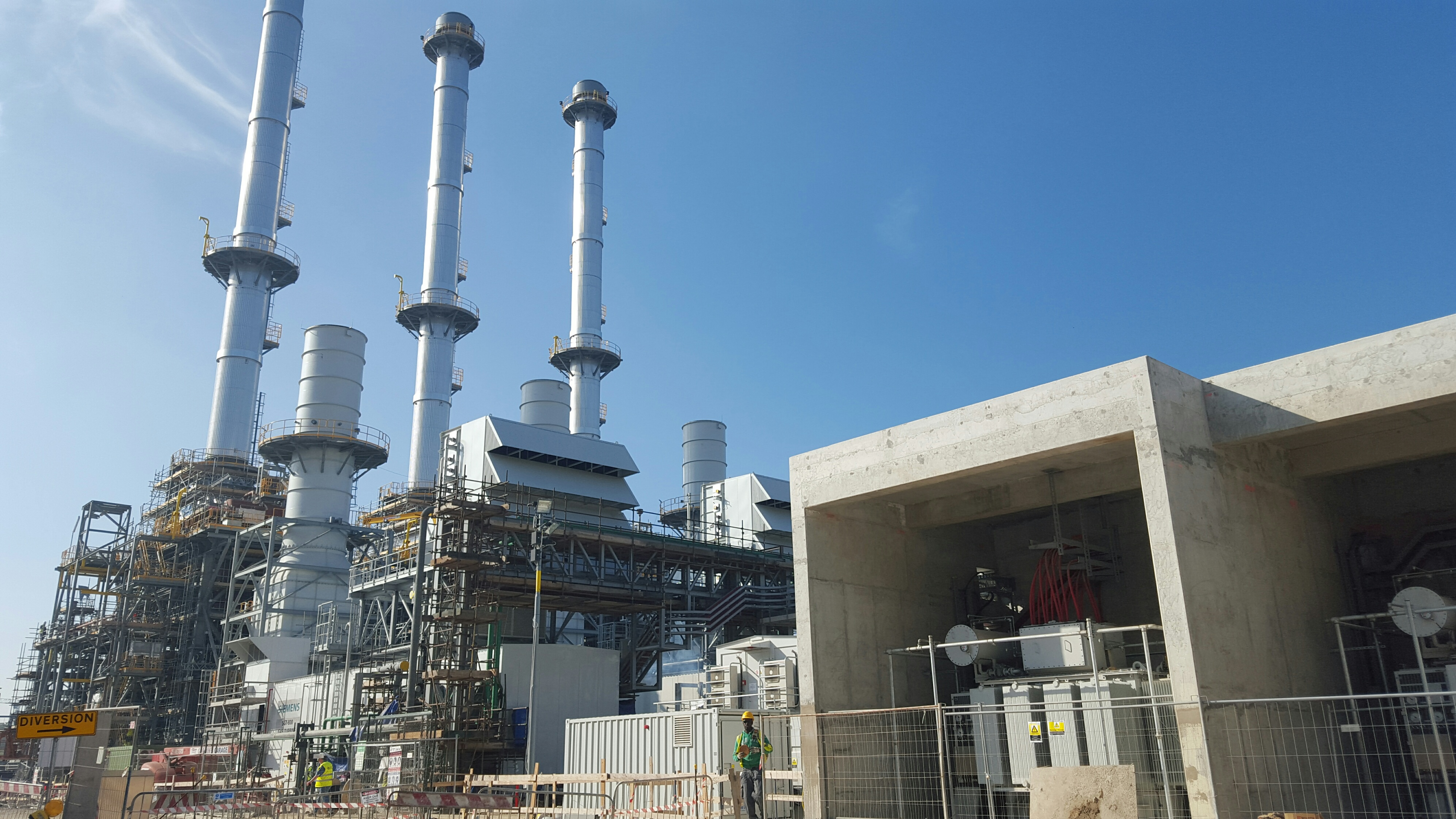
The Power & Gas project being developed in Malta

In December 2014 Shanghai Electric signed an agreement with the Government of Malta where it acquired a minority stake in the local energy producer Enemalta. The acquisition was valued at €250 million. The restructuring envisaged new investment in the local distribution system, as well as transition from oil-fired energy generation to cleaner technology, such as the Malta-Sicily interconnector, gas-fired plants and renewable energy sources. This is expected to increase the grid redundancy and flexibility. The Government of Malta retained the majority of share of the energy company.

Shanghai Electric is expected to be investing in the conversion to gas of an existing power plant which at present is powered by heavy fuel oil, valued at around €70million. In 2016, and following the investment by Shanghai Electric and the restructuring process that followed, Standard and Poor's upgraded Enemalta's rating to BB− with a stable outlook. Enemalta and Shanghai Electric established a joint venture to tap into renewable energy markets in Europe. They are jointly responsible for the development of the Mozura Wind Park project in Montenegro.

==== Marsa power plant ====
EU Change in CO^{2} Emissions emissions 2015-2014
* EU aggregate excluding Sweden.
** Includes some Eurostat estimates.
: Data for Sweden are still under revision and therefore not presented in this table.
- Not applicable.

The third pillar of the energy plan will also result in the closure of the Marsa power plant which has been operating since 1969. The Marsa power plant has been shut down, on cold standby, pending the completion of the new gas fired power plant. The local Opposition party criticised the Government of Malta that this plant has been shut down due to measures implemented by the previous Government and not due to the current Government's plans. However, the current Government's plan envisages the demolition of the 1992 Delimara Phase 1 Heavy Fuel Oil power plant.

Demolishing the 1992 power plant, would be impossible to achieve without a new power plant due to N-1 requirements. Over 700,000 tonnes CO_{2} were reduced by shutting down the Marsa power plant. Statistics from the Eurostat confirmed that Malta experienced the highest reduction in emissions in all the European Union.

==== Gas power plant and LNG facilities ====
The second pillar that would be sustaining cheaper utility tariffs in the long-term was the development of a gas fired power plant. The development of this project is based on a private-public partnerships model. The Delimara Power and Gas project is being developed by Electrogas Malta Limited, a consortium that includes SOCAR, Siemens and Gem Holdings. The consortium has been restructured following Gasol departure. Enemalta would be purchasing electricity. The local Opposition Party has been critical of this project since its details were announced, including the procurement process. However, following parliamentary questions in the European Parliament by Malta's European People's Party, the European Commission stated that there were no procurement violations.

Electrogas Malta Limited has recently won the award for Best European Energy Project which is organised by IJ Global. The project is expected to contribute greatly to the decrease in particulate matter by 90%. Through the Delimara Power and Gas project, Malta will be conforming for the first time, with the N-1 principle which is stipulated by European Union directives. Such concept enabled Malta to shift its financial resources onto other sectors, while simultaneously enjoying the benefits of modern and efficient infrastructure. The development of the gas fired power plant and the conversion to gas of another power plant is in line with the European Union Energy policy of the European Union, that encourages the shift to gas in the energy sector. Mizzi is also responsible for Projects Malta, the company tasked with overseeing private-public partnership initiative across a whole spectrum of economic sectors including tourism and other infrastructure projects.

The Gas power plant was officially opened in April 2017. The new power station was inaugurated minutes after the 25-year-old Delimara I power station was switched off. The old power station chimney, a 150 m structure in Malta will be demolished in the coming months.

=== Health ===
On assuming the health portfolio in 2014, Mizzi embarked a transformation of the health sector by attracting a private investment worth €200 million to a public-private partnership initiative. This investment was presented as a development of a new world-class hospital on the island of Gozo, with the former St. Luke's Hospital being converted into a new rehabilitation hospital.

Barts and The London School of Medicine and Dentistry will manage a new medical school as part of this project.

Vitals Global Healthcare (VGH) was selected as the preferred bidder for the €200 million investment into St Luke's Hospital, the Karin Grech Rehabilitation Hospital and Gozo General Hospital. Vitals Global has also teamed up with Mass General Brigham as part of this project.

Mizzi also worked on several other initiatives, which include out of stock medicines, the emergency department and waiting lists. In 2015, there were no out of stock medicines registered in Malta under the Pharmacy of Your Choice scheme

== Minister for Tourism ==
Mizzi was appointed Minister for Tourism on 8 June 2017 following the 2017 General Election. Apart from Tourism entities and Air Malta, Public Private Partnerships and external transport were included in his portfolio.

=== Air Malta ===
Shortly upon assuming office, Mizzi claimed his priority over the next 12 months is to restructure the national airline and ensure it becomes financially viable before a strategic partner is roped in.

On 12 July 2017, Mizzi appointed a new board of directors, with Dr Charles Mangion being the new chairman. Mizzi claimed that he would be working hand in hand with the new board of directors on the next phase of the Air Malta transformation."

Since Mizzi took over responsibility of Air Malta, the airline re-opened its Tunis and Frankfurt routes. The airline later made announcements on several other new routes, namely Manchester, Casablanca, Lisbon, St Petersburg, Kiev and Venice. Air Malta announced two additions to its fleet, by increasing to a total of 10 aircraft. On 19 June 2018, Air Malta received its first Airbus A320 Neo, branded in Nickelodeon special livery.

Mizzi has claimed that Air Malta can be a niche carrier based in Malta to help passengers connect between Europe and North Africa. On 10 September 2017, Ryanair announced its intentions of collaborating with Air Malta to start selling Air Malta flights on its online platform, and to collaborate on flight connections.

In 2019 the former Tourism Minister announced that Air Malta had made a profit of €1.2 million for 2018, after a loss of €10.8 million in 2017.

In January, Mizzi announced that a new government-owned company by the name of Malta Air Travel Ltd with a capital value of €70 million has been set and will be taking over the landing rights that Air Malta uses in some of the biggest airports around Europe. The new company will be leasing the landing slots Air Malta used in airports like Heathrow back to the national airline for its exclusive use.

=== Malta Tourism Authority ===
In order to handle enforcement, Mizzi has claimed that a 'multi agency team' will be introduced to ensure that there is better coordination and regulation of beaches before new concessions are granted. This will cover key stake holders such as the Malta Tourism Authority, Transport Malta, and the Lands department.

One of the first initiatives taken by Mizzi was a plan to appoint town managers within the Malta Foundation for Tourism Zones. Paceville, which is a main touristic area in Malta, will be the first to have a designated town manager. These town managers will have their primary responsibility to maintain tourism areas and flag any possible irregularities.

=== Route development ===
Mizzi worked on several new routes to and from Malta with different airlines. Apart from the increase in Air Malta flights, Mizzi announced new flights with Easyjet, and a pack of 12-new flights with Ryanair, following an investment of more than 100,000 Euro in a new aircraft based in Malta. These are additional from the new flights and routes announced by Air Malta which has increased 21 new routes as of September 2018.

=== Malta Air ===
Mizzi spearheaded negotiations related to Malta Air with low-cost airline giant Ryanair. Via an agreement with Government, Ryanair would invest around €1 billion which includes 6 Boeing 737 aircraft, and their operations into Malta. A group of around 60 cabin crew and pilots who work for Ryanair subsidiary Malta Air were to be made redundant in June 2020.

== Controversies ==
=== Corruption ===
Mizzi was named in the Panama Papers in April 2016. It was revealed that Mizzi had acquired a Panamanian company called Hearnville Incorporated. Its shareholder, Orion Trust Limited, was established in New Zealand through a Maltese financial services company. The trust was purchased for Mizzi through law firm Mossack Fonseca.

Criticism from the Maltese opposition party, and the general population was expressed and a motion of no-confidence was put forward. The motion was defeated and all Government Members of Parliament voted against this motion. Mizzi was nevertheless criticised by a number of high-level Labour Party figures.

Mizzi publicly disclosed his structure in his declaration of assets. Mizzi said that the fund was solely intended to protect his family's assets, which include property in Malta and in London, a statement that was rubbished by the media. Mizzi laid out the details of the trust and the company to the Maltese Parliament in February 2016. Mizzi had declared in March 2016 that Hearnville Inc was a shell company which held no assets. Mizzi requested that the Commissioner for Revenue and an international tax audit firm to carry out a tax audit on his assets. Since the audit is complete, he closed down Hearnville Incorporated. Mizzi insisted that the financial structure he set up was not illegal and he did not attempt to hide it from the public. Public outcry related to the Mizzi's hidden offshore company later led to his resignation and was subsequently voted out of the Labour party on 23 June 2020.

On 22 December 2021, Mizzi and Keith Schembri and their immediate family were sanctioned by the United States Department of State citing involvement in "significant corruption".

In May, 2024, Konrad Mizzi together with Joseph Muscat, Keith Schembri, and others were criminally charged with, among other things, bribery, criminal association, and money laundering in relation to Vitals Global Healthcare and the related Hospital contract controversy.
