= Journalists of La Nación v. Costa Rica =

2022 Supreme Court of Justice of Costa Rica case

Journalists of La Nación v. Costa Rica (Periodistas de La Nación contra el Estado de Costa Rica)
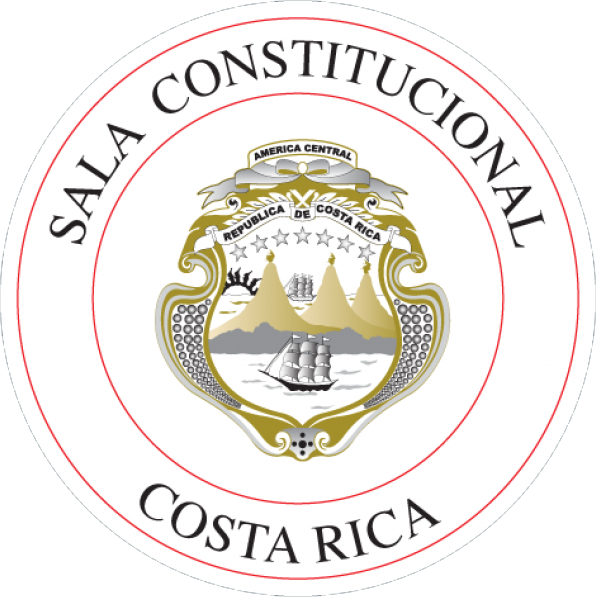
- Court: Constitutional Chamber of the Supreme Court of Justice of Costa Rica
- Full case name: Armando González Rodicio and others v. the Presidency of the Republic and the Ministry of Health (Armando González Rodicio y otros contra la Presidencia de la República y el Ministerio de Salud)
- Decided: October 21, 2022
- Citation: Resolution 2022-25167
- Transcript: Full vote

Court membership
- Judges sitting: Fernando Castillo Víquez (president); Fernando Cruz Castro; Paul Rueda Leal; Luis Fernando Salazar Alvarado; Jorge Araya García (instructor); Anamari Garro Vargas; José Roberto Garita Navarro (alternate)

Keywords
- Freedom of the press, mass media

Journalists of La Nación v. Costa Rica (also known as the Parque Viva case) was a proceeding brought before the Constitutional Chamber of the Supreme Court of Justice of Costa Rica. It involved a group of employees from the newspaper La Nación who accused President Rodrigo Chaves Robles and Minister of Health Joselyn Chacón Madrigal of violating press freedom. This complaint came after the closure of a recreational park owned by the economic group affiliated with the newspaper, which the journalists claimed was an act of retaliation. Following publications reported that Chaves had been previously sanctioned by the World Bank for sexual harassment, as well as other press releases critical of the presidential and government administration.

The complaint was filed on July 29, 2022, through the figure of the recurso de amparo, processed under file 22-016697-0007-CO, and resolved on October 21 of the same year by judgment 2022-25167, which was made public on December 7.

In the case, the constitutional court analyzed the use or application by the State of indirect restrictions on freedom of speech and freedom of the press, and the protection enjoyed by businesses linked to mass media whose purpose is to diversify their income sources, given the economic debacle experienced by the information industry since the rise of the Internet and especially the migration of advertising to sites like Facebook and Google.

== Background ==
=== La Nación ===
La Nación is the reference newspaper in Costa Rica, founded on October 12, 1946, with capital of nearly 1 million colones contributed by 188 shareholders, mostly from the agricultural sector, industrialists, and lawyers, including statesman Manuel Jiménez de la Guardia, Manuel de Mendiola Zaldívar, the founder of the Second Republic José Figueres Ferrer, politician and diplomat Gonzalo Facio Segreda, former president Francisco J. Orlich, deputy Luis Demetrio Tinoco Castro, and chancellor Rodrigo Madrigal Nieto.

The first president of the newspaper's board was Alfredo Echandi Jiménez (brother of former president Mario Echandi Jiménez), vice president Jaime Solera Bennett; secretary Édgar Odio González; treasurer Manuel Mendiola Zaldívar; and directors José Victory Marchena, Ramón Aguilar Castro, Alberto Cañas Escalante, Roberto Cañas Escalante, and Ramón Herrero Herrero.

La Nación was founded as an independent newspaper with an anti-communist line; however, in the 1970s it supported the constitutional reform of article 89 that eliminated the proscription of the Communist Party.

On October 12, 1978, due to its growing staff and more printing presses, it moved to Llorente of Tibás, which is why it is popularly known as "the newspaper of Llorente," where it has remained since then.

La Nación is part of Grupo Nación, an economic power group whose main shareholders are the Jiménez family and whose members hold shares in important Costa Rican companies, such as the beer and beverage producer Florida Ice & Farm Company (FIFCO). This group is one of the most important media conglomerates in Central America and, before the rise of the Internet, had the greatest concentration of advertising revenue and printed newspaper circulation. It had regionalized with operations in Nicaragua, El Salvador, Honduras, Guatemala, and Panama, but was diminished over the years.

Grupo Nación came to have a wide variety of media outlets, including three newspapers still in circulation: La Nación, La Teja, and El Financiero; three magazines: Perfil, Sabores, and Más Correr; three radio stations: Los 40 Principales (104.3 FM), Bésame (89.9 FM), and Qué Teja (91.5 FM), as well as digital platforms for creating websites, ordering food, finding people with similar tastes and interests, and buying tickets for public events. It made two important investments: one in 2014 for building a new newsroom for 2,750 million colones and another in 2015 for 23,000 million colones for the inauguration of Parque Viva.

In 2013, the newspaper reached a conciliatory agreement in court for the case popularly known as "rotativas" where it was accused of tax evasion maneuvers. With this agreement came the dismissal of more than 150 employees and the closure of four media outlets that were part of the group: the sports newspaper Al Día, the newspaper Ahora, the architecture and urbanism magazine SuCasa, and the magazine Soho.

From 2014, its revenues began to decline at an average of 6,031 million colones per year (24%) and it reported net profit losses in 2015 and 2016 of 1,501 million colones and 1,983 million colones, respectively.

In 2014, La Nación issued two bond emissions on the National Stock Exchange of Costa Rica (Bolsa Nacional de Valores de Costa Rica) for 10 billion colones and another for 11 billion colones. Part of those investments were acquired by the pension operators of the Banco de Costa Rica, the Costa Rican Social Security Fund and Banco Popular with maturities in 2024 and 2025.

=== Parque Viva ===
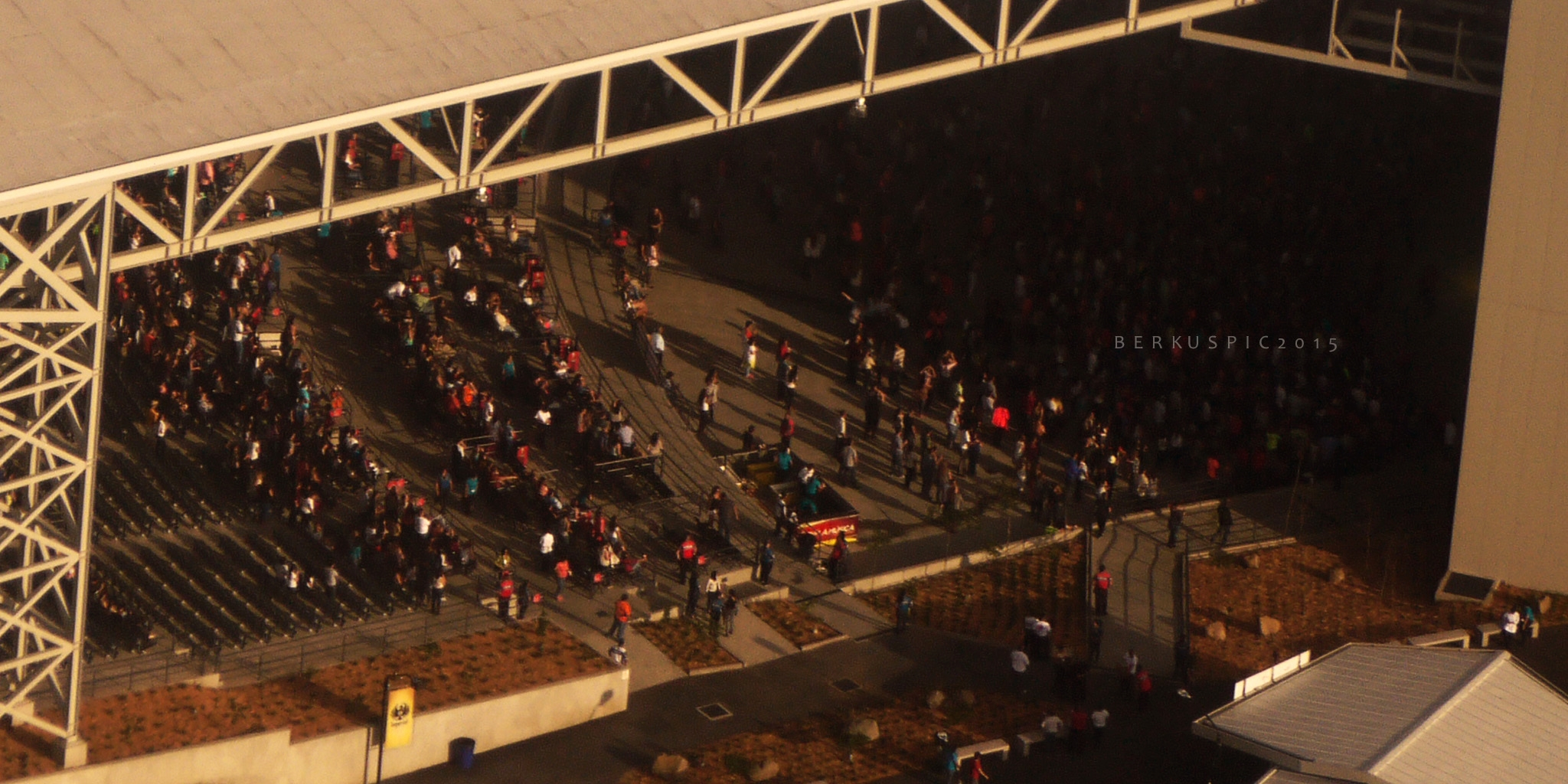
Aerial view of the Coca-Cola Amphitheater at Parque Viva.

Parque Viva is a sports and entertainment center located in Alajuela 6 kilometers from Juan Santamaría International Airport. It is considered the first entertainment center in Central America and was built around the former La Guácima Racetrack with an extension of 300,000 square meters (35 hectares), including the Coca-Cola Amphitheater, Circuito Grupo Sur, and Centro Kölbi, with a capacity of 19,000 spectators.

It was acquired in 2013 by Grupo Nación Sociedad Anónima, the corporation of which the newspaper La Nación is part, to diversify its income sources and compensate for the loss of earnings due to the migration of advertising to Internet sites.

The park began operations after obtaining required operating permits in 2015 and, since then, has held nearly 600 events with attendance of nearly 1 million people and equivalent to 63% of concerts held in Costa Rica.

In 2015, the Ministry of Health granted the park the sanitary operating permit, renewed in 2019 until 2024.

=== Rodrigo Chaves Robles ===
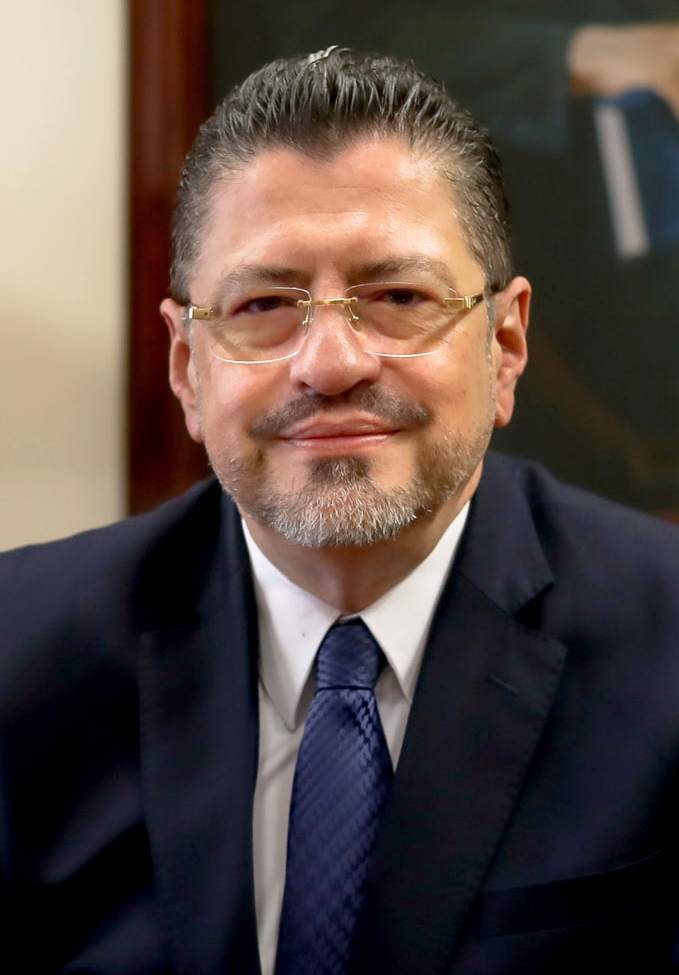
Rodrigo Chaves Robles in the presidential office in 2022.

Rodrigo Chaves Robles is a Costa Rican economist and former career official of the World Bank. He was Minister of Finance from 2019 to 2020 during the government of Carlos Alvarado Quesada and, after his forced resignation, ran for president with the Social Democratic Progress Party, winning the first and second rounds of the 2022 presidential elections with an anti-establishment discourse.

On January 29, 2022, during a political rally, Chaves promised to "cause the destruction of the corrupt structures of La Nación and Channel 7", both reference media in Costa Rica. Later during his presidency he made repeated verbal attacks on traditional media calling them "scoundrels", "political hitmen" to several journalists and on one occasion comparing them to rats.

Nine days after assuming the presidency, media revealed that the president's chief of staff, Jorge Rodríguez Vives, ordered public institutions' press directors to limit information flow to the press, stating not to see it as "censorship" but as "absolute discipline".

Chaves received a warning from the Constitutional Chamber in October 2022 after journalist Vilma Ibarra Mata, director of the program "Hablando Claro" on Radio Columbia, reported violations of rights to freedom of speech and freedom of the press after five hierarchical sources within the government told her that then Communication Minister Patricia Navarro Molina had sent via WhatsApp to all ministers and executive presidents an order to urgently suspend all state advertising in Amelia Rueda, La Nación, CRHoy.com, and Channel 7.

Practices that hinder access to information, such as preventing reporting on certain events or decisions, refusing to grant interviews to various media, not inviting them to press conferences or wheels, limiting advertising, preventing access to necessary inputs for dissemination, among other variables related to direct or indirect censorship, cannot and should not be endorsed by a Constitutional Court, for the elementary reason that their access and timely delivery must be through an easy, expeditious process without complications, guaranteeing the population and public opinion in general the right to information and freedom of expression. For these reasons, to guarantee freedom of the press and free expression enjoyed by both journalists or collective communication media and the population in general, the respondent authorities must ensure that any directive, order, act, or instruction issued from the central government always adheres to the protection of these freedoms and any fundamental right enjoyed in a democratic country like ours, in the terms explained in this judgment.

— Constitutional Chamber

In May 2023, the Constitutional Court condemned the State for Chaves' verbal attacks on the press during the conference after the Council of Government on January 9, where the Executive was questioned regarding allegations of using trolls to attack journalists and deputies. That day the president referred to several communicators as "political hitmen", "wretches" and "gossipy people" which for the court was an "unjustified excess" that could promote harassment against the alluded media and journalists.

== Closure of the park ==
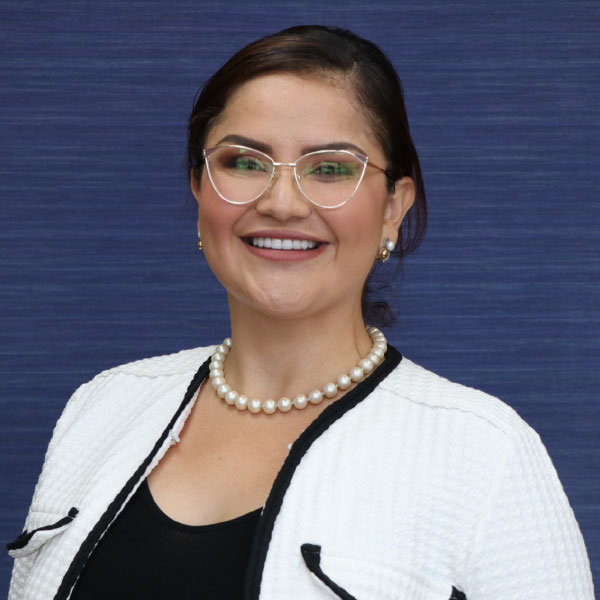
Joselyn Chacón Madrigal, Minister of Health of Costa Rica (May 8, 2022 – February 7, 2023).

On July 5, 2022, Health Minister Joselyn Chacón Madrigal received an anonymous complaint regarding structural conditions of buildings and raising complaints about traffic collapse on surrounding routes to Parque Viva when mass events were held there, requesting definitive closure until a solution was found.

That same day, Chacón urgently requested from the Ministry of Public Works and Transport (MOPT) a technical opinion on access streets to Parque Viva and forwarded the complaint to the corresponding regional direction, where one hour later a physical-sanitary inspection was carried out in which the accused problems were not found, concluding that installations met adequate internal conditions.

On July 7, 2022, the Technical Advisory Committee on Mass Gatherings of the Ministry of Health agreed with the affirmative vote of authorities from that ministry, the Ministry of Public Works and Transport, Fire Department, National Emergency Commission, and Costa Rican Red Cross to propose a sanitary closure order for mass events against Parque Viva and require a remedial plan for traffic problems affecting the area when events with large attendance were held. The next day the Ministry of Health issued the sanitary order suspending the operating permit.

The newspaper La Nación highlighted that the park closure occurred two days after the President of the Republic attacked the media regarding bonds issued by the company in the stock market and partly acquired by the Pension Operator of the Costa Rican Social Security Fund. Grupo Nación Board President Carlos González said the closure decision was "surprising" and they did not understand it since only 10% of park activities fell into "mass events" category, so the measure affected theme park, racetrack, amphitheater, sports, cultural, fairs, and exhibitions activities. Days later it was revealed that technical reports supporting the closure were issued after the closure order.

The park closure implied changing location for concerts by Flans and Pandora in July, Jesús Adrián Romero, Danny Ocean, and Ana Gabriel scheduled for September, and Sebastián Yatra on December 2.

=== Press conference of July 13, 2022 ===
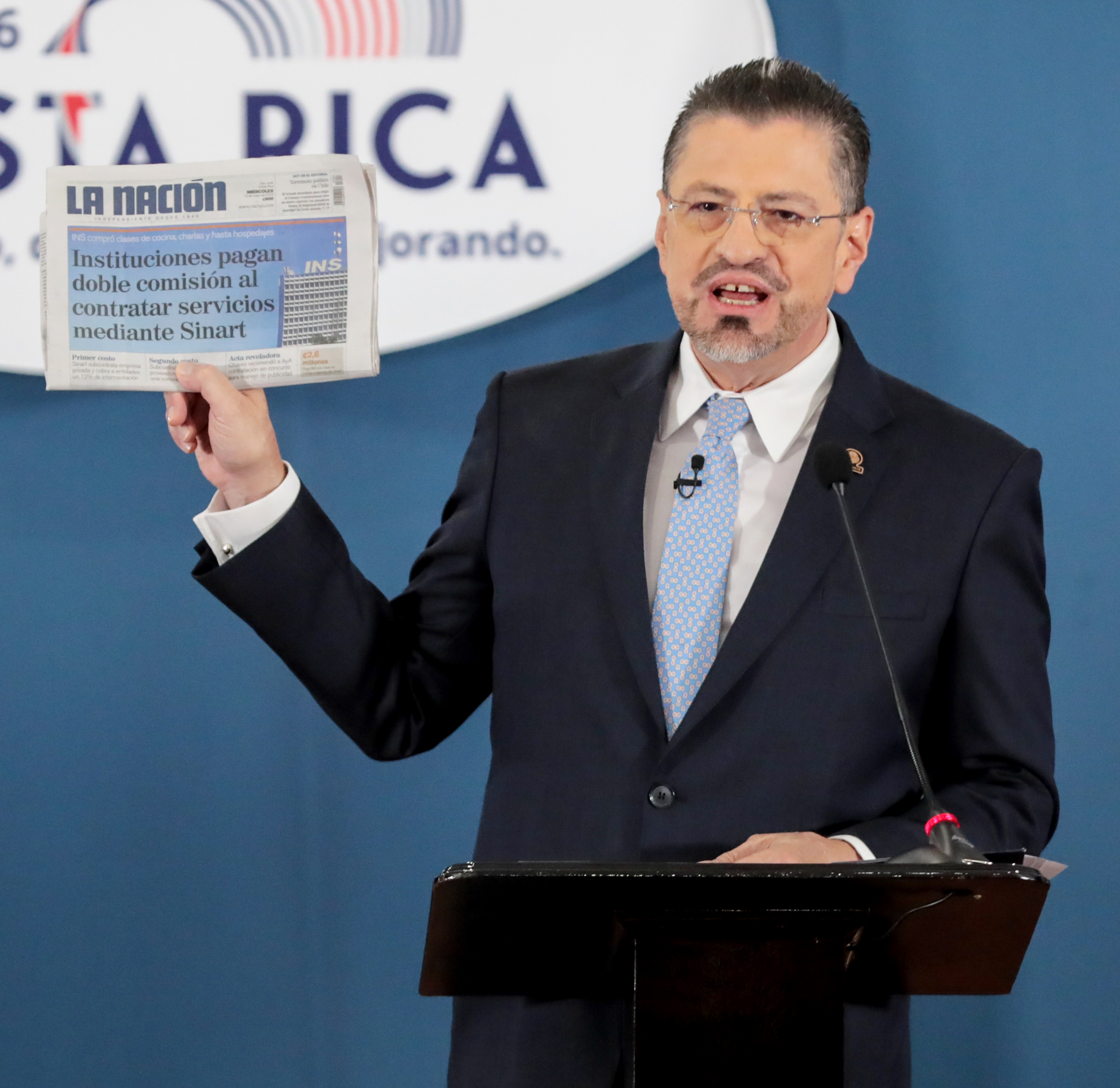
Rodrigo Chaves Robles showing a copy of La Nación at press conference.

The President of the Republic and officials of institutions requesting the establishment closure defended it by presenting at the press conference after the Government Council session on July 13, 2022 videos showing ambulances and fire vehicles unable to transit due to traffic collapse on streets surrounding Parque Viva during events there.

Public Force Director Daniel Calderón Rodríguez said a medical evacuation supported by police took more than an hour, while Fire Department General Director Héctor Chaves León stated that in the last five years the institution had attended 4,955 incidents in communities of San Antonio, El Roble, Ciruelas, and La Guácima in Alajuela Province (neighboring Parque Viva) and response times were affected by traffic congestions in the vicinity.

Minister of Public Works and Transport Luis Amador Jiménez explained that Parque Viva had no direct highway access so the adjacent street collapsed with 1,000 vehicles, while land use permit as amphitheater according to Federal Highway Administration standards implied displacement of about 6,667 vehicles, leading him to conclude that Parque Viva should never have received operating permit. He added that Grupo Nación had presented a proposal to quadruple park size and build access from National Route 27, but that would mean that highway would also collapse due to vehicular traffic.

For his part, the president dismissed allegations that park closure constituted an attack on freedom of the press and stated that "it enjoys good health and has a government that will defend it at all costs". He also accused Costa Rican correspondents of international media echoing Parque Viva closure of having "defamed this blessed homeland".

This is not about freedom of expression, it's about an business group thinking that because of their surnames and lineage they have the freedom to do whatever they please. The members of that group believe themselves a monarchy, but they were, because previous governments including former presidents who today tear their clothes for them, allowed them to be monarchy. These self-crowned feudal lords cannot believe that a government of the people and for the people has the audacity, the disrespect, to want to make them operate according to the law that governs ordinary mortals.

— Rodrigo Chaves Robles

== Constitutional Chamber ==
La Nación filed an amparo lawsuit on July 29, 2022, signed by its director, editor-in-chief, and several journalists. That same day the Constitutional Chamber magistrates voted to admit the recurso for substantive study, requesting discharge reports under oath from the President of the Republic and the Minister of Health. Although the newspaper requested temporary suspension of the park closure while the case was analyzed, the magistrates did not grant that injunction.

On September 1, 2022, the instructing magistrate required the Ministry of Health to provide the Chamber with a physical and legible copy of the 164 folios related to the complaint against Parque Viva and the final sanitary order, documentation delivered on September 5.

=== Allegations by La Nación ===
The media invoked as first allegation statements given on January 29, 2022, by Rodrigo Chaves during a campaign event where he promised to "cause the destruction of the corrupt structures of La Nación and Channel 7" and accused that less than two months after being sworn in the president had begun to materialize his warning since on July 6 of that year he called media and journalists "scoundrels", then during the press conference after that day's Government Council questioning La Nación capacity to pay 2014 debt bonds.

As second point La Nación accused that the report issued by the Ministry of Public Works and Transport regarding traffic collapse on surrounding routes did not address Parque Viva installations and that Ministry of Health inspectors' reports had ruled out any noncompliance in installations. Likewise, they alleged that issuance of the sanitary order suspending the park operating permit was without prior notice or possibility to exercise defense right and executed while institutions like the Costa Rican Fire Department and Red Cross gathered their own technical criteria.

The media accused that the sanitary order required the company to provide a remedial plan solving traffic collapse caused in park accesses despite Ministry of Health inspectors finding no problems during verifications and added that Alajuela mayor had stated that 2014 permits granted to the park coincided with rapid residential development in the area so the entertainment center could not be held responsible for traffic jams.

As fourth point, the newspaper noted that on July 15 the Ministry of Health issued a second sanitary order reconfirming the first but correcting technical deficiencies of the initial act, which they considered had "a clear purpose to limit freedom of speech by indirect means" and there was a threat to harm the company in retaliation for its editorial line, actions of its journalistic director—whom Chaves had mentioned by name in his January 29 proselytizing act—, journalistic publications regarding the sexual harassment sanction imposed by the World Bank on the president, and revelations of an alleged parallel campaign financing structure for which he was being investigated legislatively and criminally.

The fifth argument of La Nación was that Parque Viva had been affected as a consequence of the president's threats and that he as economist knew the entertainment center's purpose was to diversify company income sources, compensate for resource loss due to advertising migration to the Internet, and his statements could cause reputational damage by questioning payment capacity of 2014 bonds. The newspaper provided as evidence that Chaves acknowledged ordering then executive president of the Costa Rican Social Security Fund (CCSS), Álvaro Ramos Chaves, to request reports from the General Superintendence of Securities (SUGEVAL) on La Nación payment capacity and when he replied payments were being made as scheduled he called statements "diplomatic" and insisted on doubting bond payment, evidencing the president's actions aimed to see "if La Nación cash flow is choked".

The sixth allegation was that suspension of Parque Viva sanitary permit was an "arbitrary act and abuse of power" as it did not aim to satisfy public interests but to intimidate a media outlet, economically affecting the park-owning company and all working in the economic group's information media.

Finally the media alleged the State was responsible for traffic collapse near the park for authorizing construction of 44 condominiums and other buildings without foreseeing necessary public infrastructure and cited that according to an audit report by the Comptroller General in 2019–2021 the Alajuela Municipality had only executed on average 36.48% of cantonal road network resources, and in 2014 the Ministry of Public Works and Transport had approved Parque Viva planning study after reconversion from old La Guácima, leading it to invest more than 40 million dollars protected by legitimate trust and legal certainty principles, but now the State canceled sanitary operating permit, annulled returns on its investment after two years of closure due to the COVID-19 pandemic, and required a private entity a remedial plan for defects in a public road.

==== Legal basis ====
La Nación invoked the judgment issued by the Inter-American Court of Human Rights (IACtHR) in the case "Ríos et al. v. Venezuela" regarding offensive expressions by public power figures to directly or indirectly limit freedom of speech :

In a democratic society it is not only legitimate but sometimes a duty of state authorities to speak on public interest issues. However, in doing so they are subject to certain limitations as they must reasonably verify, though not necessarily exhaustively, facts on which they base opinions, and should do so with even greater diligence than used by individuals, due to their high office, wide reach, and potential effects their expressions may have on certain population sectors, and to avoid citizens and interested persons receiving a manipulated version of certain facts. Moreover, they must consider that as public officials they hold a guarantor position of people's fundamental rights and, therefore, their statements cannot disregard these nor constitute forms of direct or indirect interference or harmful pressure on rights of those seeking to contribute to public deliberation through expression and dissemination of their thought. This special care duty is particularly heightened in situations of greater social conflict, public order alterations, or social or political polarization, precisely due to risks they may imply for certain persons or groups at a given moment.

— Inter-American Court of Human Rights

Likewise, the newspaper cited Advisory Opinion No. OC-5/85 of the IACtHR stating that any public power act implying restriction to the right to seek, receive, and disseminate information and ideas, to a greater extent or by means different from those authorized by the same Convention, constitutes a violation of the American Convention on Human Rights. and the court's judgment in "Baruch Ivcher Bronstein v. Peru" of 2001 indicating that when evaluating an alleged restriction or limitation to freedom of expression "the Court should not limit itself solely to studying the act in question, but must also examine said act in light of the case facts as a whole, including circumstances and context in which they occurred".

=== Government allegations ===
Health Minister Joselyn Chacón Madrigal stated that acts carried out by her ministry were challenged and resolved in due time and form so they had respected due process and defense right of the complaining party, but their challenges were rejected considering assessments by the Ministry of Public Works and Transport, Fire Department, Public Force, and others. She also said the closure measure would remain until activities at Parque Viva did not cause access route collapse or annoyance to neighboring communities and allowed entry of emergency vehicles and personnel.

Chacón stated the Ministry of Health's actions adhered to law and complainants were trying to use their employer relationship with La Nación as a "coercive means of attack on the press" when obligations and commercial situations had to be borne regardless of holding positions as media owners.

For his part Rodrigo Chaves Robles stated the Political Constitution contained the State's obligation to guarantee, defend, and preserve the greatest well-being of all inhabitants; that every person had the right to a healthy environment and the Fundamental Charter enshrined protection to freedom of speech as long as it did not constitute an excess unlawfully violating or harming a third party.

Without surprise, but with much concern, I receive the amparo recurso filed by persons close to Grupo Nación, where they expose situations with little or no relation to restricting this media's freedom of the press, and rather it seems that, shielded in that mistaken discourse, they demand—without restraint—that the State must allow them to operate as they wish, even if contrary to law and detrimental to public well-being.

— Rodrigo Chaves Robles

Chaves defended questioning La Nación bond payment capacity stating CCSS officials had concerns whether the company could honor its 5,950 million colones obligation due to the business group's financial statements and real estate movements (including its main building) to a company trust. He also justified rapid government actions after the complaint stating it was to protect "thousands of people".

The president added that review of Alajuela Municipality file granting construction permits to Parque Viva showed land use permits for fairground, amphitheater, hotel, and food services did not respect the current regulatory plan; that the farm where the park is located was a green zone and not medium-intensity residential zone; and that environmental viability permit granted was for improvements to La Guácima Racetrack and not to develop a fairground.

I will not sleep with a clear conscience if during the next concert there is an emergency and a girl, an elderly person dies, humble people's houses are lost in a fire, simply for the economic benefit of a group that shields itself in freedom of expression every time it is requested to comply with the law. There is no, under any circumstance, an indirect attack on freedom of the press; at no time have I ordered health authorities to act in a certain way, all decisions have been made according to technical parameters acting based on a complaint filed by citizens themselves. As a Costa Rican and public official, I have the obligation and right to speak forcefully on situations endangering public health; paradoxically, it is a constitutional right assisting me to freely express my thoughts, and I will do so most vehemently when protecting Costa Rican families' rights, and even more when concerning the most vulnerable population.

— Rodrigo Chaves Robles

==== Legal basis ====
The Health Minister invoked articles 21 and 50 of the Political Constitution of Costa Rica regarding the right to life and right to health as fundamental rights with the State's duty to protect them, as well as article 140 regarding Executive Power powers. She also cited article 214 of the General Public Administration Law establishing administrative procedures as means to ensure compliance with public administration purposes through a process to determine the real truth of facts.

Chacón also invoked articles 1, 2, and 341 of the General Health Law stating population health is a public good protected by the State and among that institution's attributions is to order and take special measures enabled by said law to avoid risks or damages to persons' health or their spread or aggravation.

Finally the minister mentioned a press release issued on July 12, 2022, by the College of Journalists and Professionals in Collective Communication of Costa Rica (COLPER) indicating that after holding a meeting with the President of the Republic and Grupo Nación president they concluded majority interest was above individual interests and requesting a remedial plan from the conglomerate had no relation nor affected freedom of the press.

Chaves defended his right as public official to express opinions by virtue of Constitutional Chamber judgment 2022-9855 and similar rulings by that court, the European Court of Human Rights, and Inter-American Court of Human Rights which he did not individualize except for "Ríos et al. v. Venezuela" where the Inter-American Commission on Human Rights said annexed statements "although they may have strong and critical content that can even be valued as offensive, constitute legitimate expressions of thoughts and opinions on particular ways a media can exercise journalism".

Finally the president invoked the ninth principle of the Declaration of Chapultepec stating that "press credibility is linked to commitment to truth, pursuit of precision, impartiality, and fairness, and clear differentiation between journalistic messages and commercial ones".

=== Facts ===
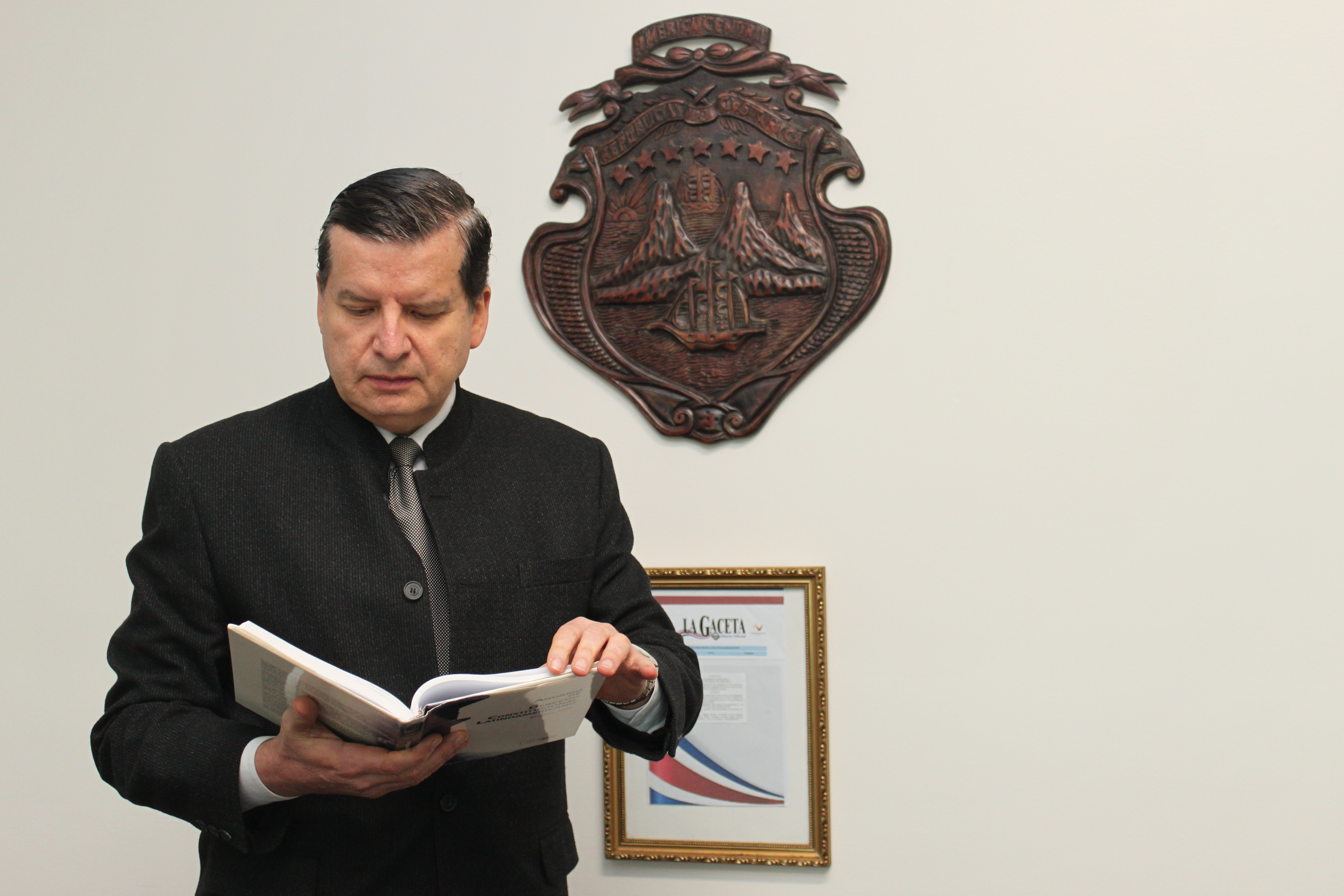
Jorge Araya García, instructing magistrate of the case.

The Constitutional Chamber president appointed magistrate Jorge Araya García as case instructor so it was his responsibility to bring a draft resolution to the full court for deliberation by all judges. The judgment consists of 49 "proven facts", six "relevant facts" for the Chamber, and two "unproven facts".

Among "proven facts" was one from 2014 that the Permits Unit and Studies and Designs Department of the General Traffic Engineering Directorate of the Ministry of Public Works and Transport had no objections to Parque Viva environmental impact study and others stating that in 2021 and 2022 the General Traffic Engineering Directorate, National Road Council, and National Concessions Council had expressed "no objection" to the project to build a road access to Parque Viva from route 27.

Also included was one from July 9, 2022, when a community leader from Guácima received a government request to speak in favor of Parque Viva closure and was sent a letter format addressed to the Health Minister supporting said closure; statements by Alajuela mayor Humberto Soto that traffic congestion in La Guácima was not caused solely by Parque Viva but also due to district residential growth and new condominiums built in the area and declarations by La Guácima councilor Alonso Castillo in an expanded district council session that district traffic problems were daily.

As "facts of interest" were listed journalistic publications by La Nación regarding Rodrigo Chaves related to World Bank sexual harassment sanctions, criticisms of his proposal to govern through referendums, and alleged parallel structures used in his political campaign financing. These publications dated August 30 and 31, September 7, October 18 and 19, 2021; February 4 and 13, March 5, 8, 28, and 29, April 1 and 25, 2022.

Likewise, Chaves' statements from January 29, 2022, promising to "cause the destruction of the corrupt structures of La Nación and Channel 7", his manifestations on January 30 in a campaign closing event reiterating "this tsunami will sweep you like house garbage", his statements on February 6 declaring that when referring to "scoundrel press" he alluded to La Nación, CRHoy, and Channel 7; as well as his statements the next day affirming those three media "are at the service of interests greatly affected in a Rodrigo Chaves government and have done the impossible for a political execution and lynching".

The court also considered manifestations given on July 6 in press conference where Chaves asked what would happen if La Nación cash flow mainly from Parque Viva was cut; his statements in press conference on July 20 noting that among reasons for canceling the "Greater Metropolitan Area Passenger Electric Train" project financed by the Central American Bank for Economic Integration (BCIE) was that one branch would pass through Parque Viva and his statements on August 3 in press conference comparing press media to rats and "other fauna species".

The "unproven facts" were that before Parque Viva began operations its representatives had been required to present and implement a plan addressing imputed traffic problems, and that Parque Viva representatives had been notified of what was disposed in offices MSP-DM-DVURFP-DGFP-DRSA-SBDRA-D26-0827-2022 from Alajuela Public Force Direction and PE-243-07-2022 from the Executive Presidency of the National Housing and Urbanism Institute (INVU).

=== Substantive judgment ===
(pdf) Substantive judgment of the Constitutional Chamber on the case.

The magistrates began the substantive judgment by recapping the right to freedom of speech calling it "one of the pillars on which the rule of law is founded" and comprising the guarantee to express own or others' thoughts and opinions. In that sense the court cited the judgment in "Herrera Ulloa v. Costa Rica" issued by the Inter-American Court of Human Rights in 2004, the Special Rapporteur for Freedom of Expression of the Inter-American Commission on Human Rights, and articles 28 and 29 of the Political Constitution of Costa Rica regarding that right. Likewise, as international law source it invoked the International Covenant on Civil and Political Rights, the Universal Declaration of Human Rights, the American Convention on Human Rights, the American Declaration of the Rights and Duties of Man, the Declaration of Chapultepec, the Declaration of Principles on Freedom of Speech, the European Convention on Human Rights, and the Charter of Fundamental Rights of the European Union.

The court recalled its jurisprudence dating from judgment 8196 of 2000 indicating freedom of speech is considered an essential freedom serving as basis for exercising other freedoms, prohibition of prior censorship, and limits applied to freedom of speech, especially that only through formal law from the Legislative Power by constitutional procedure can fundamental rights and freedoms be regulated and restricted.

It is clear that the use or application by state authorities or individuals of indirect restrictions gravely and flagrantly attacks freedom of expression and freedom of the press. Hence, the importance of the safeguard and protection provided by our Political Constitution and the American Convention on Human Rights, among other instruments; hence also the responsibility on this Constitutional Chamber to ensure compliance.

— Constitutional Chamber

The Constitutional Chamber recognized that traditional mass media experienced marked economic decline in recent years due to several factors, one main being the arrival of the Internet transforming how people access information, as well as decrease in advertising investment in traditional media as many companies migrated ads to large digital platforms like Google and Facebook translating into significant change in public information consumption habits from acquiring printed press and tuning radio or television programs to informing through digital devices like smartphones, tablet computers, and computers.

The ruling recognized that due to economic challenges traditional media have been forced to innovate and seek new income and audience sources to finance journalism (especially investigative journalism) and have implemented various commercial strategies like creating digital platforms with subscription models ("pay to view"), production of high-quality and exclusive content to attract audience, use of podcasts to transmit audio content, organization of events, forums, and congresses with experts charging participation, sale of content to third parties (even competitors), and licensing their brand for third companies to use in related products or services like international news agencies.

Likewise, it was noted that as part of strategies used by media to maintain financial sustainability some have opted to acquire or associate with other companies, whether directly related to journalism or not, such as The Boston Globe and The New York Times bought in 2013 by John Henry, owner of baseball team Red Sox and soccer team Liverpool FC; acquisition by Warren Buffett in 2012 of 73 Media General newspapers in the southeastern United States or purchase by Jeff Bezos (founder and owner of Amazon) of The Washington Post. The Chamber equated those examples to Grupo Nación case for buying and transforming La Guácima Racetrack into Parque Viva events center to compensate for advertising revenue loss due to migration to online platforms.

This type of financial structures, like the rest of supra cited examples, become an income or resource source aiding or making possible journalistic work, considering revenues they generate allow covering or offsetting many expenses demanded by a media outlet. Therefore, it is a reality that if this type of mechanisms or proposals are illegitimately or arbitrarily affected, journalism exercise is harmed in turn; essentially, freedom of the press as manifestation of freedom of expression.

— Constitutional Chamber

The court recognized those additional financing structures must comply with regulations including urban, building, sanitary, safety, and fiscal norms, but if restrictions or sanctions were imposed illegitimately and disproportionately it generated a violation of freedom of the press and an abuse of authority.

==== Specific case ====
The court structured the explanation of its judgment in four sections: "prior clarifications", "Parque Viva closure through arbitrary, unfounded, and disproportionate action", "Parque Viva closure and indirect violation of freedom of expression", and finally "final clarifications of interest".

As prior clarification, magistrates recalled the Constitutional Court usually does not intervene in technical matters related to requirements for obtaining sanitary permit or technical decisions to revoke them; however, they noted that limitation did not prevent analyzing sanitary orders from constitutional perspective when directly related to fundamental rights in exceptional cases, particularly when a sanitary order affected other public freedoms closely linked to democratic system sustainability like freedom of expression.

From the above, it is highly relevant to consider that in this amparo we face an absolutely exceptional situation, as one of the most important and transcendent fundamental rights for the people of Costa Rica and its prized democratic system is at stake, namely freedom of expression. Hence the full justification for this Constitutional Court to hear this matter substantively via amparo, and rule on the accused facts.

— Constitutional Chamber

==== Analysis of government action ====
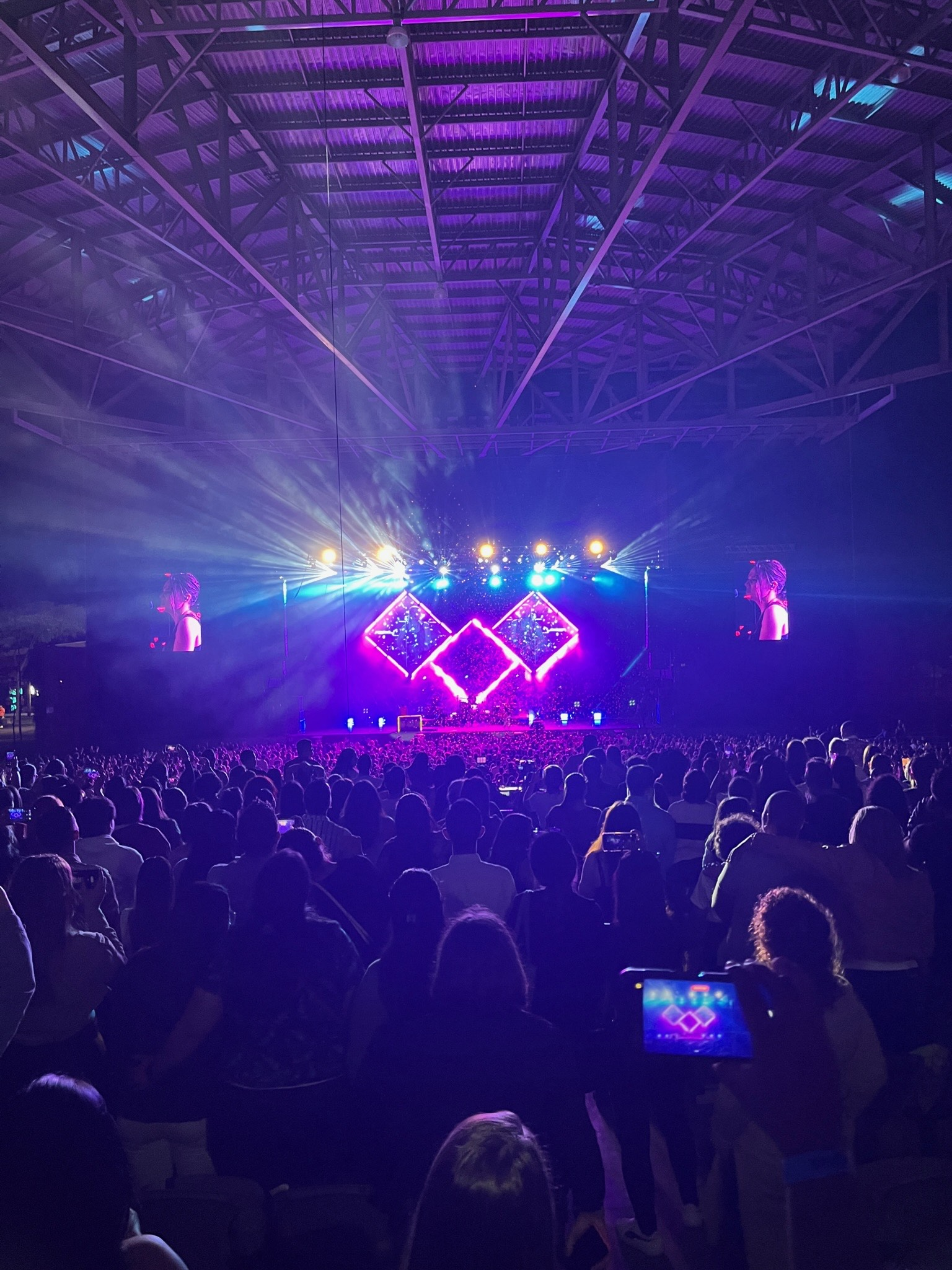
Concert by Mexican duo Jesse & Joy at Parque Viva in September 2023.

After recounting facts deemed "proven", allegations by both parties, and evidence incorporated into the file, the court entered the next section stating from the outset that Parque Viva closure was carried out through a sanitary order lacking adequate motivation or foundation, as it did not mention legal reasons supporting its issuance and was based on inspection acts not directly related to irregularities at the site, plus the order was issued before valid technical criteria supporting the measure were collected, turning it into public administration arbitrariness as it transgressed the affected party's right to counsel and due process.

The ruling particularly emphasized the main problem leading to park closure was related to access streets located outside installations involving vehicular support, street condition, and traffic congestion issues, not exclusive responsibility of the commercial venue since involved roads were local competence and the Alajuela Municipality was the entity responsible for maintaining them and solving area traffic problems; moreover, because Ministry of Health authorities did not request an opinion from that local government during complaint processing despite that when the Ministry of Health required technical criteria from Ministry of Public Works and Transport (MOPT) authorities these indicated responsibility lay with Alajuela Municipality.

The court argued that in the case it was not recorded that before granting operating permits for Parque Viva in 2015 its representatives had been required to present a project addressing imputed traffic problems like building access outside the venue or larger projects, but if such requirement had been made and adequate action omitted the proper course was to file a process in jurisdictional instances instead of issuing a sanitary order and requesting a remedial plan as means to remedy a possible omission.

Likewise, it said the traffic problem in La Guácima was not due exclusively to events organized at Parque Viva but also related to vertiginous urban development in the community including numerous condominiums built since 2010. Moreover, they noted Ministry of Health authorities were not only requiring presentation of a remedial plan but also its implementation and execution which would complicate compliance and could keep the site closed indefinitely.

The court highlighted that Parque Viva and its representatives had taken precautions to address vehicular congestion problems in surroundings as they had managed a road project to build a direct four-lane access from Route 27 to the establishment, project with preliminary approval from several government instances during 2021 and early 2022. However, the project was publicly discredited by the president creating a difficult situation for the park as it was required to present and execute a remedial plan to solve the traffic problem while a project aimed at fulfilling that purpose was discredited. The court did not affirm the project in question had to be approved but it was an interesting proposal and technical option advanced in administrative process but rejected without solid technical or legal foundation despite support from several technically competent administrative instances.

On the other hand the ruling noted the president's argument mentioning requirement to shopping centers to build access before opening was not applicable to Parque Viva case as the amparo lawsuit was raised in a different circumstance since the venue had been operating for more than seven years until required to build such accesses or present a larger plan to address area congestion problems. Moreover, it was highlighted that Parque Viva demand was not limited to building access but involved solving vehicular congestion problems in La Guácima which was much more complex and difficult to comply with, so the requirement to the park was "unfounded" and "arbitrary" as it was asked to solve problems not its exclusive responsibility arising from circumstances different from those applied to other commercial establishments in different situations.

The judges criticized that the president had used two reports (one from Alajuela Public Force regional subdirector and another from INVU executive president) as justification for Parque Viva closure as they indicated it was unknown when, how, why, and by whom those reports were requested nor how they reached the president's hands. Moreover, the court argued those offices' content could not be used to divert attention from what occurred in the case as they did not serve as foundation for issuing the sanitary order leading to venue closure and because it was not recorded those documents had been notified to Parque Viva representative, which would have allowed exercising defense right and due process.

For the court if there had been noncompliance with requirements by Parque Viva when granting operating permits as alleged by the president the proper course was to resort to ordinary legal channels and file pertinent processes instead of using those reports as basis for establishment closure, especially because Alajuela Municipality had publicly denied aspects noted in INVU report. They also emphasized all actions must adhere to legality principle regardless of position held by the public official.

Next the Constitutional Chamber highlighted that Parque Viva closure was issued for any type of event (mass or not) lacking foundation and improper since the initial complaint referred to problems occurring at the venue when mass activities were held. It was also noted that subsequent technical reports issued by various institutions also referred only to mass events and did not recommend total venue closure and even the Ministry of Transport recommended holding mass gatherings up to 2,400 people per event.

Thus disposed totally deprives Grupo Nación of perceiving any type of income, despite that, as stated, there was no foundation supporting the decision not to allow non-mass events.

— Constitutional Chamber

The court highlighted the speed with which Ministry of Health authorities acted in response to the anonymous complaint filed on July 5, 2022, originating the sanitary order and Parque Viva closure as the complaint was forwarded by the Health Minister and authorities conducted an inspection one hour later; moreover, the Ministry of Public Works and Transport issued an opinion on the complaint the same day it was requested. The panel of judges stated that while Public Administration was obligated to act with efficacy, efficiency, and resolve complaints in reasonable terms it was "unusual" to act with such speed in this case so it warned the government that with its actions it set "an important precedent" and expected it to continue acting diligently in similar cases in the future.

In the ruling was mentioned the news published on July 10, 2022, in La Nación reporting a La Guácima neighbor stated a public institution official provided her a draft letter addressed to the Health Minister supporting Parque Viva closure, making her believe the government was trying to correct a situation they themselves caused by closing the events center. It was also highlighted the president mentioned in his report the anonymous complaint was made by La Guácima neighbors despite being anonymous so complainants' geographic location could not be determined, aspects magistrates indicated did not constitute fundamental rights violation but mentioned them to be considered together with other considerations exposed in the judgment.

In application of reasonableness and proportionality examination the Constitutional Chamber determined the Parque Viva closure measure for any activity lacked "legitimacy, suitability, necessity, and proportionality in strict sense":

- Legitimacy: As it was issued "hastily, arbitrarily, and without certain foundation" supporting it given factual and legal assumptions on which the sanitary order was based were not exclusive to Parque Viva and not duly proven when issuing the order, plus because the measure imposed a burdensome consequence without legal order support.
- Suitability: As objective material elements motive-content were not supported by technical evidence.
- Necessity: As there were less harmful alternatives to achieve the same objective of protecting public health.
- Proportionality in strict sense: As it harmed essential content of other fundamental rights, particularly right to defense and due process.

The Constitutional Court concluded that while protecting life, health, and integrity of persons was important it did not justify "precipitous and disproportionate" adoption of measures affecting other fundamental rights. Likewise, it indicated that while there were problems in the road network near Parque Viva that needed addressing to ensure safe transit in emergencies those problems could not be entirely attributed to the company nor justify imposing responsibility to solve them through absolute closure of its installations considering it "a drastic and extreme measure".

==== "Indirect violation" of freedom of expression ====
In the third section magistrates analyzed whether the park closure, already determined as "arbitrary administrative act, lacking support, and also disproportionate", constituted a violation of the right to freedom of speech. For this they again considered amparo lawsuit allegations, president's defense, and evidence incorporated into the file.

First the court recapped Rodrigo Chaves' statements and manifestations against media (especially La Nación, Channel 7, and CRhoy) and noted they coincided in time with news publications addressing topics like sexual harassment accusations and his campaign financing, concluding it represented an attempt to intimidate and threaten the press due to its coverage. In that context the court noted the sanitary order issued against Parque Viva had an indirect impact on La Nación as it negatively affected its business group revenues and found striking that it was issued one day after the newspaper published a note defending its finances against the president's statements added to the fact the president himself acknowledged to the Chamber that La Nación depended on Parque Viva for financial subsistence, confirming venue closure harmed the media.

Having that factual picture noted magistrates concluded Parque Viva closure did constitute an indirect violation of freedom of expression and the president's actions were "a clear and unquestionable warning issued to La Nación to refrain from incurring in already described facts, namely, publishing news harming the president's or government's image in general".

Punishment is then for what was already published and made known regarding the president, his political party, and his way of intending to govern, but also a warning is issued so this type of news is not disclosed again to citizens. Moreover, it is important to note this threatening message attacking freedom of expression is sent not only to Diario La Nación but also dangerously to the country's other media daring to publish any news against the President and his government. Thus, it is evident Parque Viva closure is an indirect, hasty, and illegitimate mechanism violating freedom of expression. Previous state of affairs proscribed by the American Convention on Human Rights itself in its numeral 13.3 and which, as also clarified, can not only be carried out through "abuse of official or private controls of newsprint, radio frequencies, or equipment and devices used in information dissemination" but also "by any other means aimed at impeding communication and circulation of ideas and opinions". Parque Viva closure perfectly fits this last description and becomes yet another example, like those cited in considering VII of this judgment, of how fundamental right to freedom of expression can be indirectly violated.

— Constitutional Chamber

The judges stated Parque Viva closure was carried out "with abuse of authority through an indirect mechanism, with a purpose clearly different from the stated one" and they had it "absolutely clear". Likewise, they said this evidenced that in the analyzed case they faced what that same court had resolved in a prior vote in 2016 when noting "a perverse and anti-democratic way of using State power to direct opinion, according to a 'reward or punishment' system to those exercising constitutionally and conventionally guaranteed freedom of the press and free expression".

The court compared Chaves and his government's actions to those carried out by the Venezuelan government against Radio Caracas Televisión condemned by the IACtHR for holding it is not possible to restrict the right to freedom of expression based on political discrepancy a certain editorial line may generate for the government, and discredited the president's defense of having right to express insults toward media:

It has been the President of the Republic himself—highest-ranking public official in our country, with great power and influence—who has made the above-noted statements and who while assisted by the right to opine what he thinks, the truth is he must do so under certain limits by virtue of his investiture and, moreover, without violating other rights or to the detriment of other equally essential freedoms, especially in a Democratic Rule of Law State. In this regard, it is worth reminding the presidential president something very important on which this Constitutional Chamber elaborated and explained extensively in considering VI of this Judgment, namely that high-ranking public officials, as is his case, are obligated to tolerate, with greater margin or amplitude, criticisms to which they are subjected and continuously exposed precisely due to the position they hold and public interest surrounding actions they carry out.

— Constitutional Chamber

Next magistrates warned accused facts represented "a breach of the Constitutional Rule of Law" requiring their intervention particularly considering attacks on media "are usually the first targets of anti-democratic and authoritarian political systems or, at least, those heading or directing toward that".

For all this the Chamber concluded article 29 of the Costa Rican Constitution and article 13.3 of the American Convention on Human Rights were violated "due to veiled censorship and indirect restrictions on freedom of speech".

==== Final clarifications ====
In the last section of the judgment the court made known it was not advocating acting outside the law framework but applying law fairly and adequately. It clarified it was not preventing oversight of commercial ventures but required such oversight be carried out according to established legal framework avoiding hasty and arbitrary methods. Likewise, it recognized importance of protecting life, health, and integrity of persons but emphasized administration actions must comply with the block of legality.

Finally judges clarified their judgment did not mean commercial activities linked to media were exempt from legal controls but closing a business to silence a media outlet represented an indirect violation of public freedoms and fundamental rights.

=== Operative part ===
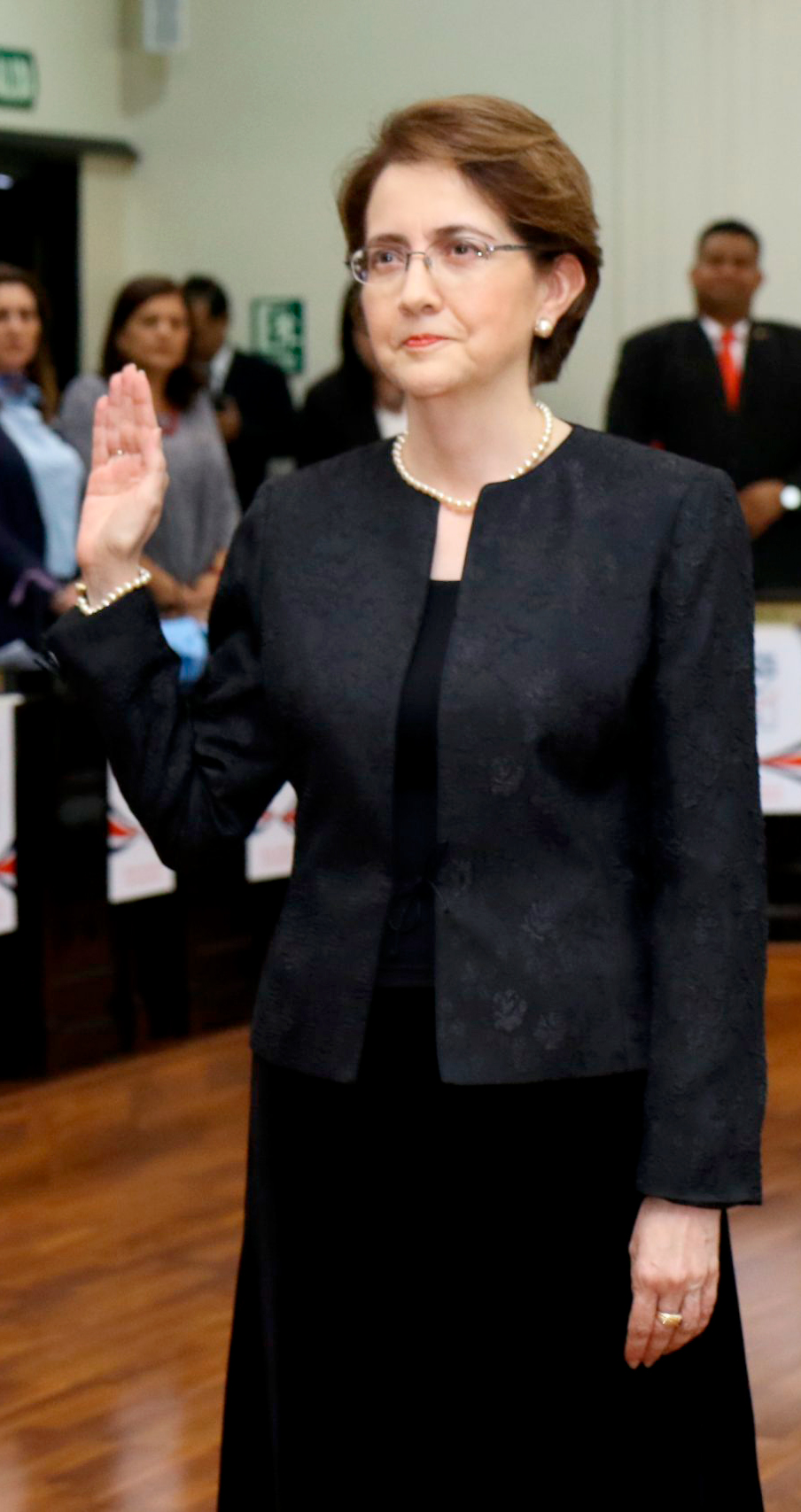
Magistrate Anamari Garro Vargas partially saved the vote.

The judgment was signed by magistrates Fernando Castillo Víquez, Fernando Cruz Castro, Paul Rueda Leal, Luis Fernando Salazar Alvarado, Jorge Araya García, and José Roberto Garita Navarro forming the majority, while magistrate Anamari Garro Vargas issued a partial dissenting opinion.

The majority ordered granting the amparo lawsuit in all its extremes annulling the sanitary closure order of Parque Viva and condemning the State to pay costs, damages, and losses caused by accused facts. Magistrate Cruz Castro filed an individual note regarding freedom of opinion and its distortions while magistrate Salazar Alvarado filed additional reasons and added that having declared "with place" the amparo annulling the sanitary order the respondent authorities must carry out coordination measures to execute the remedial plan referenced in the process within 18 months, to provide an integral solution to the traffic congestion problem affecting La Guácima neighbors.

Magistrate Garro Vargas partially dissented with a 117-page writing declaring "with place" the amparo for her own reasons regarding defense of freedom of expression considering the president's actions constituted "a direct, manifest, though relative act of censorship" and declared it "without place" regarding annulment of the sanitary order as she considered matters relative to that process could not be known by constitutional jurisdiction and because complainants had not fulfilled requirement of accrediting legitimacy to litigate on behalf of the company they worked for.

== Impact ==
=== Parque Viva closure ===
- Former Costa Rican President Miguel Ángel Rodríguez stated: "I have no affection for La Nación which persecuted me like no one: 26 front pages with headlines against me in a month, even a front page with only previous headlines against me. But this seems to me barbaric and a grave danger".
- Former President Laura Chinchilla Miranda said she joined the concern expressed by Rodríguez: "We do not defend a particular media but our exceptional freedom of speech regime which has not been product of chance but permanent exercise of tolerance by its rulers".
- Deputy Andrea Álvarez Marín of the National Liberation Party called the park closure "revenge" and stated it attacked freedom of expression and enterprise.
- International press media echoed Parque Viva closure and linked it to Chaves attacks on La Nación.
- College of Journalists president Belisario Solano said "I, at least personally, consider there is no [attack on freedom of speech] because we are really talking about two different things".
- The Speed Pilots Association, TCR Motorsport, Header Piques, Racing Adventure, and Kartism Racers Association (ACEK) reported "incalculable economic losses" due to total Parque Viva closure.
- The Competitiveness Promotion Council (CPC) requested the Government to "respect fundamental rights and due process that for decades have characterized Costa Rica, to guarantee legal certainty".
- The Inter American Press Association (SIP) expressed "concern over the public discourse of Costa Rica's president Rodrigo Chaves and administrative actions against the newspaper La Nación and one of its companies".
- The Costa Rican Chamber of Industries (CICR) stated Parque Viva closure "puts legal certainty at risk" and national and foreign investment.
- The Chamber of Mass Events Promoters and Related (CAPEMA) expressed concern after closure: "After two years of paralysis of our activities due to the pandemic, this decision again puts our industry and income sources of thousands of Costa Ricans depending on it at risk".
- The University of Costa Rica Students Federation (FEUNA) issued a statement indicating: "We repudiate actions taken by Rodrigo Chaves government to withdraw Ministry of Health operating permit from Parque Viva, property of Grupo Nación. That measure, by the way it was carried out and previous facts between the media and president's statements in previous days, represents clear persecution and alarming signal of authoritarianism, bullying, and populism by Chaves government".
- The Progressive Liberal Party legislative fraction stated "the haste in the measure adopted by the Ministry of Health puts legal certainty in the country at risk, and therefore we will demand accounts on the issued order. The six PLP deputies will ensure consumers' rights are safeguarded, as thousands of Costa Ricans had already bought tickets for events to be held at this location".

=== Judicial resolution ===
- La Nación director Armando González stated the ruling "is a feeling of enormous joy for us, but above all for the country. Freedom of speech is a right on which all others rest… We awaited the ruling with much anxiety, but with great certainty the result would be favorable".
- Grupo Nación executive director Pedro Abreu stated the Constitutional Chamber ruling was an achievement for the company, the country, and its institutionality: "The country we live in has been exemplary throughout its history; it is a democratic country with strong institutionality. What is correct, laws, prevail, and that is fundamental for a democracy".
- The Presidential House issued a brief press release indicating "the Government will continue defending citizens' health and safety according to our Political Constitution".
- Rodrigo Chaves Robles accused the Constitutional Chamber of performing a "legal contortion" in favor of La Nación: "It is incredible and difficult to understand that neighbors' health in La Guácima is put on the scale, while on the other side private business of mass permits in a park built without corresponding permits and with great appearance of illegality, if not evidence, is put. The scale tipped toward interests".
- Former President Carlos Alvarado Quesada stated the ruling "is an unequivocal message about what Costa Rica is and must continue to be".
- Former President Luis Guillermo Solís Rivera said he hoped the government would rectify decisions taken using technical means to "dress evident political decisions".
- College of Journalists president Belisario Solano stated "this ruling marks a milestone in the Chamber's jurisprudential history, where apparently it would be based on existing criteria and rulings from the Inter-American Court of Human Rights, which has somehow said that freedom of press and expression cannot be threatened even by indirect means, the Constitutional Chamber by majority has noted that this type of measures could affect freedom of press and speech and like any judicial ruling, it must be respected"
- Legislative Assembly Vice President Gloria Navas Montero qualified the ruling as "a historic pronouncement for constitutional jurisprudence and Costa Rican fundamental rights" and emphasized the judgment demonstrated that when the government ordered Parque Viva closure "it was an abuse of power".
- PLN fraction leader Kattia Rivera Soto said they always considered the need to defend communication right and different actors' participation right, but initially remained silent because they did not want to enter a specific case of a private company.
- National Liberation Party subchief Óscar Izquierdo Sandí considered the judicial decision "demonstrates ignorance of laws by President Chaves and Health Minister Joselyn Chacón".
- Progressive Liberal Party fraction chief Eliécer Feinzaig stated "I think it's excellent that the Government promotes change and wants to improve things, but it must do so within the framework of respect, legality, and due process".
- Social Christian Unity Party deputy Vanessa de Paul Castro said "the Chamber has made a legal and timely decision, and I celebrate it because it means strengthening that fundamental freedom of press for the country, more with the context we have today".
- Broad Front deputy Ariel Robles Barrantes expressed concern because "due to a government grudge, a political issue, now the State has to pay costs and inconveniences generated for Parque Viva".
- Street Racing League president (company organizing motorsports championships in Costa Rica) Lisandro Salas said the guild was optimistic after the judgment and awaited notification to organize events by year-end.
- "Noches de Piques" and "Piques de Cabezales" organizer Diego Chavarría stated "it is joy for the entire motorsports guild. Grupo Nación made a great effort to return pilots the opportunity to compete. It has not been easy for anyone, economic losses were very large and now we must convince racers and sponsors events will continue both this year and 2023".
- Rock Fest founder and producer Ernesto Adduci stated: "It makes me very happy because Parque Viva is an optimal place to hold concerts in Costa Rica. There is no place with Parque Viva characteristics. It is a perfect place for us as entrepreneurs, for the music industry needing spaces of this type and there is not a single one resembling Parque Viva".
- Move Concerts producer Andrés Guanipa qualified the measure as "absolutely in accordance with the right. Obviously this should never have happened. There was no need to do that, if the same criterion had been applied to other venues, other venues would also have had to close".
- Journalists filing the amparo lawsuit announced they would not charge the State costs, damages, and losses recognized by the Constitutional Court in its judgment.
- An OPol Consultores poll indicated 52.8% of the population was against the Constitutional Chamber judgment versus 30.7% in favor.

== Bibliography ==
- Constitutional Chamber of the Supreme Court of Costa Rica (December 7, 2022). Judgment 2022-025167 [Sentencia 2022-025167] (PDF) (Report) (in Spanish). Delfino.cr.
- IACtHR (January 28, 2009). Judgment of January 28, 2009 (Preliminary Exceptions, Merits, Reparations, and Costs) [Sentencia de 28 de enero de 2009 (Excepciones Preliminares, Fondo, Reparaciones y Costas)] (PDF) (Report) (in Spanish). IACtHR.
