= Pilatus Bank =

Maltese bank

- Company type: Corporation
- Founded: 2014
- Defunct: 2018
- Headquarters: Ta' Xbiex, Malta
- Key people: Seyed Ali Sadr Hasheminejad, founder and CEO

Pilatus Bank Plc was a bank established in Ta' Xbiex, Malta. The bank was created in 2013 to provide private and commercial banking services to high net-worth individuals and was closed down in 2018, after major local and international money laundering scandals. The bank was also involved in major local political controversies involving former energy minister Konrad Mizzi, former OPM chief of staff Keith Schembri, and businessman and murder suspect Yorgen Fenech.

== History ==
Pilatus Bank started its operations in January 2014. Its owner was Seyed Ali Sadr Hasheminejad, known as Ali Sadr. The bank came into the spotlight after reporter Daphne Caruana Galizia accused the bank of laundering funds from allegedly corrupt schemes on behalf of offshore companies and individuals. An 18-month investigation by a magistrate in Malta disproved any claims that Egrant was connected to Joseph Muscat or Michelle Muscat. However, the bank was found to lack any serious controls to monitor money transfers, fined and eventually had its banking licence revoked.

Ali Sadr was charged with violating US sanctions against Iran in the United States in March 2018. Found guilty at trial, the court decision was reversed in July 2020.

On 4 November 2018, the bank had their banking license revoked by the European Central Bank (ECB). Following the release of Ali Sadr in 2020, Pilatus tried unsuccessfully taking legal action through the European Court of Justice for the return of the banking license and for damages against the ECB. In September 2022, the International Centre for Settlement of Investment Disputes has called on Malta to halt any possible legal action against Ali Sadr. Sadr is claiming Maltese authorities, namely the MFSA and FIAU have personally prosecuted him and violated his rights. There is intense political pressure for Maltese authorities to take legal action against Sadr.

== Pilatus Bank clients ==
"Aliyev Empire", by The Sentry, maps many of Pilatus Bank’s high-risk and politically connected customers from Azerbaijan, including Arzu and Leyla Aliyeva, daughters of Azerbaijan’s President Ilham Aliyev, who leads a brutal and repressive regime.

The Sentry's network map is live here: https://atlas.thesentry.org/azerbaijan-aliyev-empire/network-map/

== See also ==
- List of banks in Malta
