= Panama Papers and Europe =

Countries with politicians, public officials or close associates implicated in the leak on April 15, 2016 (As of May 19, 2016)

The Panama Papers are 11.5 million leaked documents that detail financial and attorney–client information for more than 214,488 offshore entities. The documents, some dating back to the 1970s, were created by, and taken from, Panamanian law firm and corporate service provider Mossack Fonseca, and were leaked in 2015 by an anonymous source.

This page details related allegations, reactions, and investigations, in Europe.

== European Union ==
Many senior EU figures have been implicated in the Panama Papers scandal. The European Commissioner for Taxation, Pierre Moscovici, has said that the European Union as a whole had a "duty" to prevent the kind of tax avoidance uncovered in the Panama Papers scandal. Moscovici told reporters the use of offshore companies to hide what he called "shocking amounts" of financial assets from tax authorities was "unethical". He estimated that the tax shelters resulted in an annual loss of some €1 trillion in public finances, adding that the European Commission has attempted to tighten tax rules across the union since November 2014 due to the Luxembourg Leaks scandal, also revealed by the ICIJ, and that he hoped the extent of the Panama Papers revelations would spur countries to action.

In a 2013 letter, unearthed by the Financial Times to the then president of the European Council, Herman Van Rompuy, the then Prime Minister of the United Kingdom David Cameron said that offshore trusts should not automatically be subject to the same transparency requirements as shell companies.

== Andorra ==
The Panama Papers revealed that the Minister of Finance of Andorra, Jordi Cinca, while he was CEO of Orfund SA, maintained an offshore company called Mariette Holdings Inc, until its dissolution in 2002 for fear of discovery of his participation in these businesses. The business activities of Orfund had ties to the blood diamond trade, and the refining and sale of African gold. This company closed shortly before the civil war in Ivory Coast.

The opposition demanded his resignation as a result. In response, Cinca said that "if their connection would affect the Government of Andorra, will step down". Still, he did not.

== Austria ==
Austria's financial market authority has announced that they will audit two Austrian banks that were mentioned in the Panama Papers – Raiffeisenbank International (RBI) and Hypo Vorarlberg. It will be specifically examining whether the banks have complied with their obligation to prevent money laundering. Hypo Vorarlberg subsequently announced that while they have complied with all laws in the past, they are planning to retreat completely from the offshore sector.

== Bulgaria ==
In 2018, investigative media Bivol.bg accessed the Panama Papers under an agreement with the International Consortium of Investigative Journalists. Later, they published a story about the offshore company Viafot which is attempting to acquire a key asset of Bulgaria's defense industry: the arms producer Dunarit. The Panama Papers show that Viafot is owned by Alexander Angelov who is the lawyer of media mogul Delyan Peevski. Other Bulgarian media had reported how all state institutions helped Viafot acquire Dunarit through illegitimate means. However, no inquiry was opened by Bulgaria's General Prosecutor Sotir Tsatsarov.

Initially, in 2016, access to the Panama Papers was granted only to journalist Alexenia Dimitrova. However, the spokesperson of the Ministry of Foreign Affairs (Bulgaria) raised concern that Dimitrova worked for the communist secret services, so her work with the papers may be biased.

== Cyprus ==
Central Bank of Cyprus officially declared: "With regard to press reports citing leaked documents, known as the Panama Papers, the Central Bank of Cyprus announces that it is assessing the information to the extent that it may concern the Cypriot banking system and taking, where necessary, appropriate action." A Cypriot online paper said "The Cyprus link stems from the fact that Fonseca runs an office in Cyprus and, more specifically, in Limassol. In a chart, the leaks name Cyprus as a tax haven (countries that offer little or no tax), although it has a corporate tax rate of 12.5%, the same as Ireland."

== Denmark ==
In September 2016, Danish tax authorities purchased Panama Papers data on 320 companies and some 500-600 individuals to investigate. Although the data came from an anonymous source, it was vetted with credible sample data.

== France ==
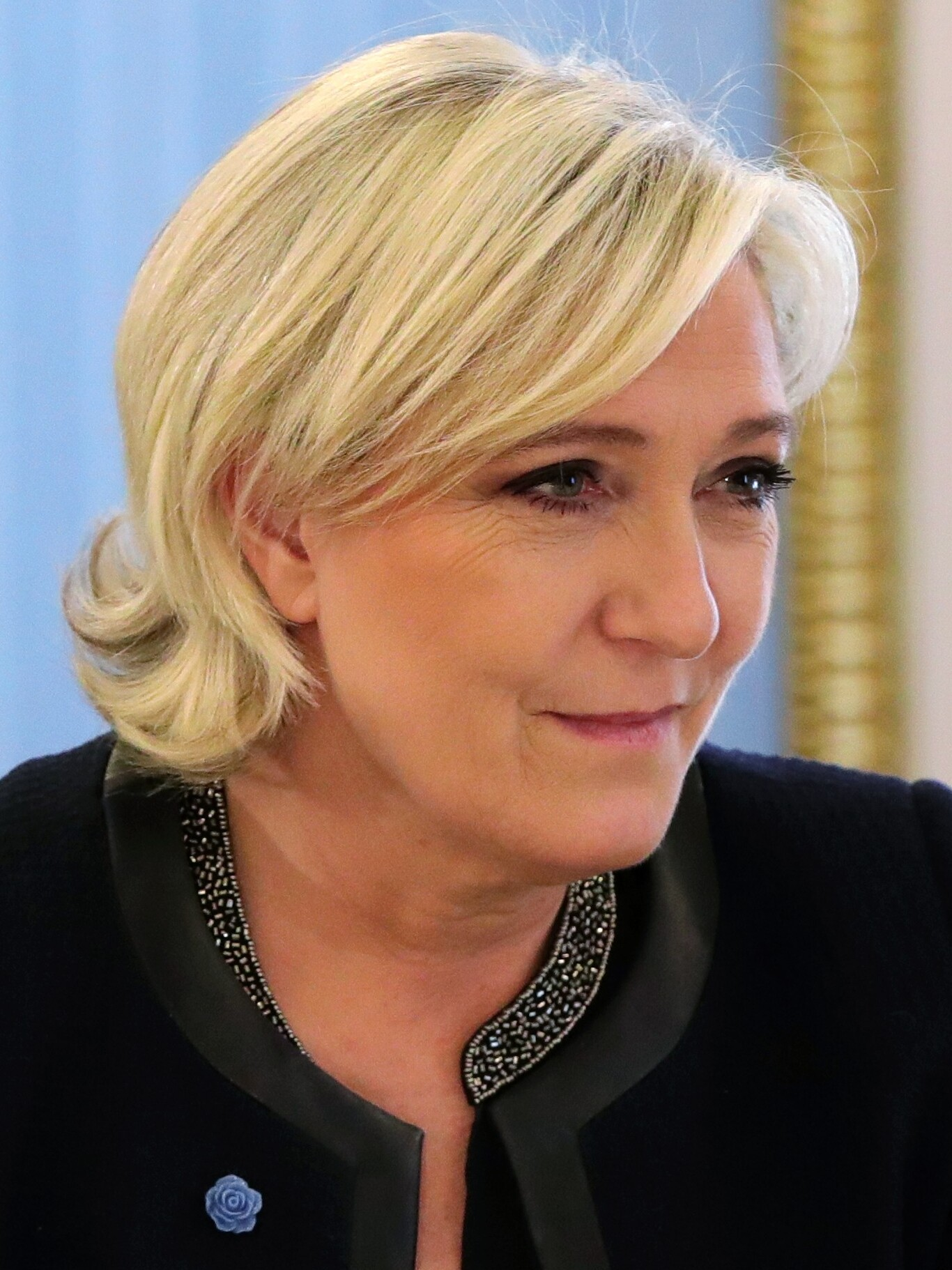
Marine Le Pen

French financial prosecutors opened a probe, and former President François Hollande declared that tax evaders would be brought to trial and punished. Also as a result of the leak, France restored Panama to its list of tax havens, from which Panama had recently been removed.

Former French budget minister Jérôme Cahuzac, who spearheaded a crackdown on tax fraud while in office, was a client of Mossack Fonseca, legal partners central to the global Panama Papers tax evasion and money laundering scandal. Leaked documents of the law firm's revealed Cahuzac's chain of ownership of a Seychelles company, Cerman Group Limited, incorporated in 2009. When France investigated 2013 allegations by Mediapart that in 2000 Cahuzac had held undeclared assets in an account first in Switzerland, then Singapore, he resigned his cabinet post, protesting his innocence, but admitted a few months later that he indeed had hidden €600,000 in a UBS account and then moved it to keep it hidden, "while continuing to lead France's clampdown on tax evasion". The French Socialist Party unanimously voted to expel him a week later. Spurred by the April 2013 Cahuzac affair, President Hollande created the National Financial Prosecutor's Office (Parquet national financier; PNF), a judicial investigation unit specializing in large-scale fraud and corruption investigations.

Jean-Marie Le Pen, founder and long-time leader of the far-right-wing Front National (FN) and formerly a member of the European Parliament, already was the subject, along with his daughter Marine Le Pen and his staff, of a PNF tax fraud investigation. Drawing official scrutiny was an undeclared HSBC account containing €2.2m in gold and coins, managed from Geneva by an aide through a trust based in the British Virgin Islands which was closed and then moved to the Bahamas in 2014; allegations of overbilling; misuse and comingling of campaign funds; and tax evasion. Jean-Marie Le Pen is also suspected of using his European Parliament funds for the campaign and administrative expenses of his French political party. Jean-Marie Le Pen is mentioned in the documents, along with his daughter Marine Le Pen, who is the current party leader, and Frederic Chatillon, an FN insider who is also a close friend of Marine. Among the three of them, they may have hidden as much as a million pounds in offshore accounts.

== Greece ==
The Panama Papers confirmed that the politician Stavros Papastavrou, who was the advisor of former Prime Ministers Kostas Karamanlis and Antonis Samaras, had been a member of the council of the Panamanian foundations, Green Shamrock Foundation and Diman Foundation, from 2005 to 2014. In 2006, he became deputy chairman of the Aisios Foundation, which still exists today. However, Papstavrou resigned from the Aisios Foundation in 2012.

Several Greek families with significant art collections were implicated in this scandal.

== Iceland ==
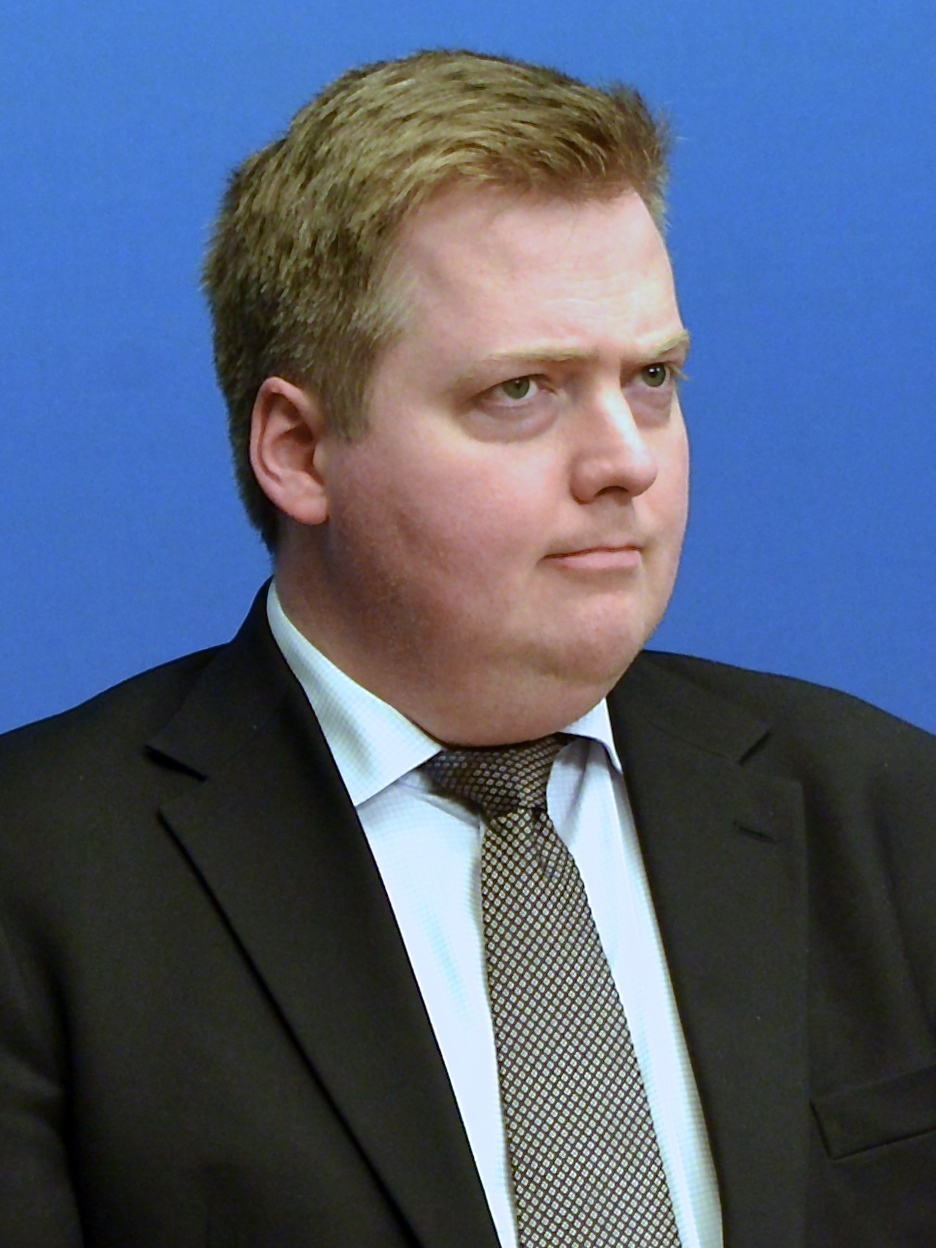
Sigmundur Davíð Gunnlaugsson, Prime Minister of Iceland, stepped aside on April 5, 2016.

Prime Minister Sigmundur Davíð Gunnlaugsson, elected after the 2008 banking collapse in Iceland, had pledged to clean up corruption in the banking system. But when Sigmundur Davíð took his seat he did not disclose his 50% interest in Wintris, a company that owned bonds of one of the bankrupt banks, nor divest himself of it, until the day before a new law took effect on January 1, 2010, that would have required him to declare this conflict of interest. He sold his share to his wife, who owns the other half. The couple both come from wealthy families. When they bought Wintris he was working as a journalist and she is an anthropologist. Until he failed to disclose the asset, he broke no laws. But the country remembers the 2008 financial crisis all too well and thought it had put it in the past. Since Sigmundur Davíð negotiated on behalf of Iceland with creditors of failed Icelandic banks, the discovery that Sigmundur Davíð's wife is a bondholder caused so much outrage that 22,000–24,000 people attended an anti-government protest outside the parliament on April 4, 2016, almost 8% of the population. Sigmundur Davíð suggested a snap election, but the other members of the coalition government did not want elections, just his resignation. On April 5, 2016, Prime Minister of Iceland Sigmundur Davíð Gunnlaugsson announced his resignation.

The Reykjavik Grapevine and the news site Kjarninn revealed that President Ólafur Ragnar Grímsson had connections to Lasca Finance Limited, registered in 2005 in the British Virgin Islands. Ólafur Ragnar had categorically denied any personal or family ties to companies in tax havens. The parents of his wife, Dorrit Moussaieff, operated the company 1999–2005. The financial statements of the Moussaieff family business show it received nearly £7 million ($10.2 million US, €9.1 million) in interest payments from Lasca during 2000–2005. In 2005 Moussaieff Jewelers Limited sold its 10% stake of Lasca to S. Dorrit Moussaieff's deceased father and her mother, now 86 years old and the registered owner of the Lasca ownership stake. Dorrit and her sisters Tamara and Sharon will inherit her fortune, considered among the largest in the world.

Bjarni Benediktsson, Iceland's finance minister and the chairman of Sigmundur Davíð's coalition partner, comes from one of Iceland's wealthiest families. He confirmed that he owned 33% of Falson & Co., a Seychelles shell company founded in 2005 to purchase real estate in Dubai. It was still active in 2009, when Bjarni was already a member of parliament with financial disclosure requirements. He said he registered the company with tax authorities, and he was not aware that it was registered in the Seychelles. Minister of the Interior Ólöf Nordal and her husband had powers of attorney for Dooley Securities S.A., an offshore company located in Panama. She said that the company was founded for her husband but was never used, so she did not think she had to disclose it. Hrólfur Ölvisson, the managing director of Sigmundur Davíð's Progressive Party, says the Mossack Fonseca companies that list his name have been inactive for a very long time, and were legal.

Businesswoman Ingibjörg Pálmadóttir and her husband Jón Ásgeir Jóhannesson have for several years financed their business dealings through a Panamanian company, Guru Invest, which owns shares in retailer Sports Direct through Rhapsody Investments (Europe), based in Luxembourg. Guru Invest paid around US$16 million to Glitnir bank after it crashed to cover the debt of Gaumur, one of Jón Ásgeir's companies, and loaned ISK 100 million to Jón Ásgeir's company Þú Blásól through an offshore company he owns named Jovita. Asked by journalists at Kjarninn where that money came from, Ingibjörg did not reply. Ingibjörg is the primary owner of the 365 media group, which owns the Icelandic news outlets Vísir.is, television channel Stöð 2 and radio stations Bylgjan, X-ið and FM 957, none of which seem to be reporting this disclosure.

== Ireland ==
The Irish Times newspaper handled the Irish component of the leak. Prominent Irish names listed included golfer Pádraig Harrington, property developer Sean Mulryan and the manager of Irish rock group U2, Paul McGuinness. The lists also included Stanley Watson, a senior partner of Ireland's largest tax-law firm, Matheson, who has led the creation of many of the Irish corporate tax management tools used by US multinationals in Ireland to avoid billions in US taxes. The list also included Irish Fine Gael political advisor, Frank Flannery.

== Italy ==
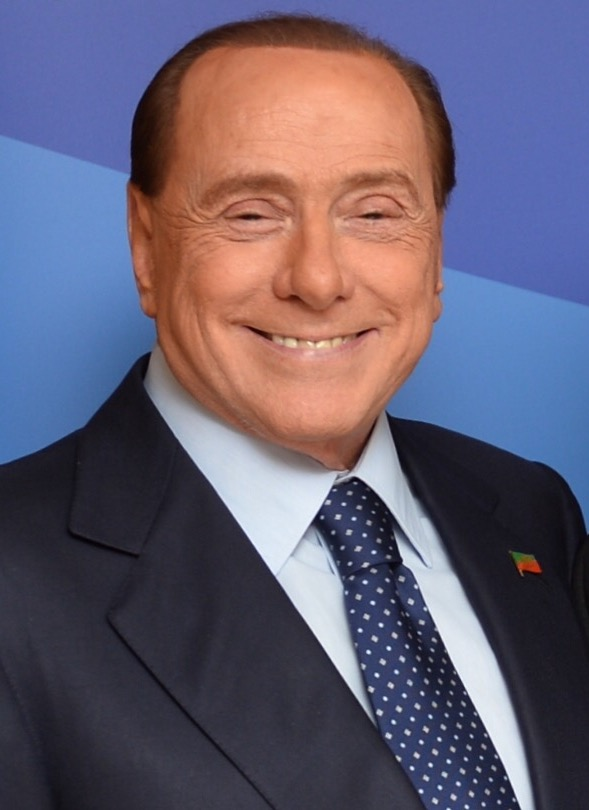
Silvio Berlusconi, former Prime Minister of Italy

On April 6, 2016, Italy's Procura of Turin ordered the Guardia di Finanza to investigate the 800 Italians contained in the Panama Papers' documents.

Former long-time prime minister Silvio Berlusconi, who had been already convicted for tax evasion and expelled from the Parliament, was included in the papers. Other notable people whose names are mentioned in the Papers include entrepreneurs Luca Cordero di Montezemolo, Flavio Briatore, Adriano Galliani, and actor Carlo Verdone.

An investigation by ICIJ partner The Namibian found that the imprisoned mafioso Vito Roberto Palazzolo shielded his finances from Italian, Namibian and South African authorities with shell companies in the British Virgin Islands set up by a German banker in Hong Kong, Wolf-Peter Berthold, which they also used to transfer control of Palazzolo's assets to his son.

== Malta ==
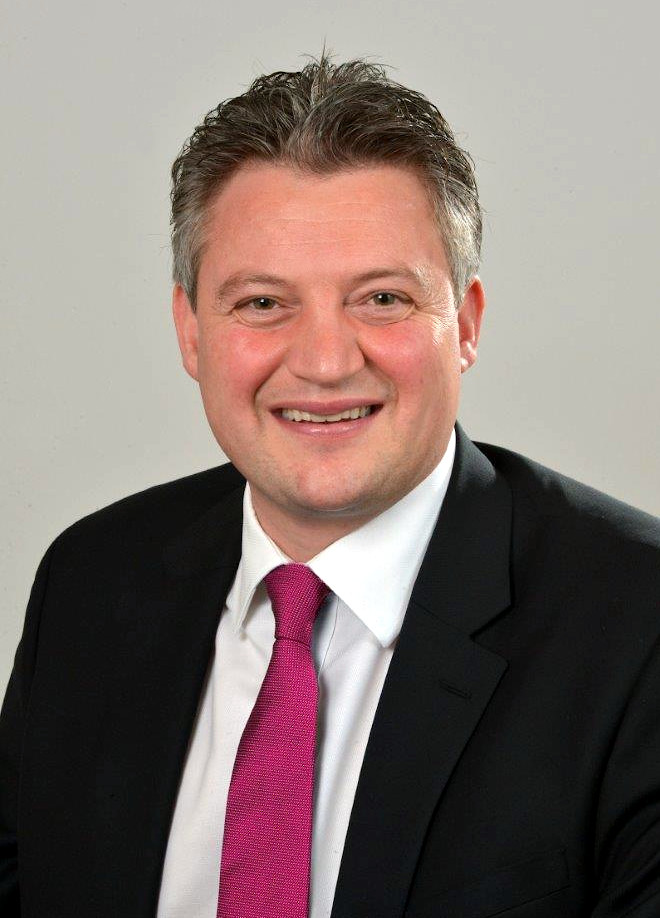
Konrad Mizzi, former Minister for Energy and Health and former Minister for Tourism, Malta

The Panama Papers linked a minister in the government of Prime Minister Joseph Muscat, Konrad Mizzi, and the prime minister's chief of staff, Keith Schembri, to shell companies in Panama. Furthermore, Mizzi's wife, Sai Mizzi Liang, who is Malta's trade envoy to China and Consul General for Malta in Shanghai, China, was also named as beneficiary, together with their children, of a trust based in New Zealand holding Mizzi's Panama shell company.

Mizzi, until April 28, 2016, Minister for Health and Energy is listed in the Panama Papers as the owner of a Panama shell company called Hearnville Inc.

Indications in the Maltese press of Mizzi's links to an offshore trust did not prevent Mizzi from being elected deputy leader for party affairs of the ruling Labour Party on February 25, 2016, following a change in the party statutes to enable a sitting MP to be appointed. Mizzi stepped down as deputy leader of the Labour Party on April 28, 2016.

Schembri, a businessman who managed the electoral campaign of the Labour Party in the 2013 Maltese general elections, and serves as chief of staff to Muscat, was reported to hold an offshore company based in the British Virgin Islands, and owns an anonymous shell company in Panama, called Tillgate Inc, held by a trust established for him in New Zealand. Konrad Mizzi and Keith Schembri acquired their shell companies in Panama, Hearnville Inc and Tillgate Inc respectively, via the Mossack Fonseca representatives in Malta, who also tried to open bank accounts linked to the two shell companies of the two politically exposed persons in various jurisdictions. The owner of a third anonymous shell company in Panama, Egrant Inc, whose existence was revealed in the same document referring to the other two companies, remains unknown, although the strict secrecy observed in its acquisition, including the avoidance of e-mail communications and the utilization of communications via Skype, have fuelled strong suspicions that a third top Maltese politically exposed person is involved.

In a 2015 declaration of assets, dated February 8 and submitted to the Maltese Parliament at the end of March 2016, which Muscat said he'd been shown in draft form before the Panama Papers were leaked, Mizzi listed the trust in New Zealand and the shell company in Panama. As of April 28, 2016, a report on the matter commissioned by the Government of Malta by an unnamed international audit firm was still pending. On April 28, 2016, Muscat announced a cabinet reshuffle; Mizzi lost his ministerial portfolio of Health and Energy, but was retained as a minister without portfolio in the Office of the Prime Minister.

Malta is the only member of the European Union that have a minister implicated in this scandal and to date. Not withstanding Mizzi and Schembri's involvement in this scandal they still hold very high positions in the Maltese government. Mark A. Sammut wrote a book about the case, called L-Aqwa fl-Ewropa. Il-Panama Papers u l-Poter (The Very Best in Europe. The Panama Papers and Power). In October 2017, Daphne Caruana Galizia, a blogger who led the Panama Papers investigation into corruption in Malta, was killed by a car bomb near her home.

Since then Malta, as an EU Member State, has been required to strengthen the transparency of its registers of corporate ownership, showing who ultimately controls every company within its jurisdiction. The Malta Financial Services Authority was demerged from Malta's Registry of Companies in 2018 in order to focus on separate regulatory roles and duties. The Registry of Companies is a stand-alone agency and is known as the Malta Business Registry.

== Norway ==
The Norwegian Tax Administration expects to demand access to information from DNB (Norway's largest financial services group) about approximately 30 companies formed by DNB that are owned by Norwegians, 20 of whom are living in Norway. 200 Norwegians are on the client list of Mossack Fonseca.

== Portugal ==
The ICIJ's Offshore Leaks Database shows that Portugal had 246 Offshore Entities, 300 Officers, 40 Intermediaries and 175 Addresses linked to the activities described in the Mossack-Fonseca papers, with newspapers reporting the involvement of several politicians, government officials, bankers and company managers. As of May 2017, there were no criminal or judicial consequences for any of the involved.

== Russia ==
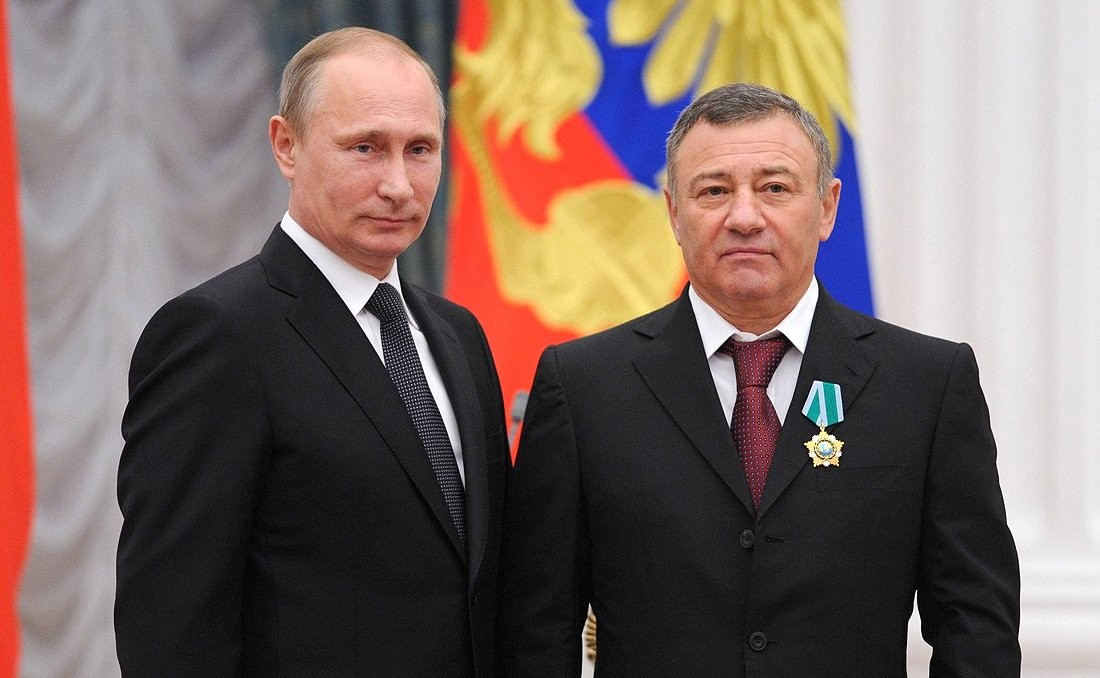
Russian president Vladimir Putin with Russian businessman and oligarch Arkady Rotenberg

The Süddeutsche Zeitung, one of the newspapers participating in the project that made the papers public, described the connections of various individuals listed in them to Russian president Vladimir Putin. They quoted Nobel-winning economist Paul Krugman and US State Department documents saying that Russia is a "kleptocracy" and a "mafia state" respectively. The Süddeutsche Zeitung reported about $2 billion had moved through a network of companies associated with Russian firms and individuals in "just a few years" and the companies appeared to have been used for "questionable business transactions".

Putin has criticized offshore companies as "unpatriotic" on several occasions since 2011 and in 2013 a law was passed banning foreign bank accounts for government officials.

Putin's name does not appear in any of the records released to date, but those of his associates do. Construction billionaires Arkady and Boris Rotenberg, musician Sergei Roldugin and business magnate Alisher Usmanov are mentioned in the leaked documents, as are Putin's long-standing friend, billionaire Gennady Timchenko, as well as his press secretary's spouse, his cousin, and former KGB colleagues, as well as several oligarchs connected to Mossack Fonseca shell companies.

Sergei Roldugin, a cellist with the St Petersburg orchestra who is the godfather of Putin's eldest daughter and who has been described as Putin's "best friend", appears prominently in the Panama Papers. According to the leaked papers, Roldugin acquired assets worth at least $100 million, including a 12.5% stake in Video International (Russia's largest television advertising firm), companies that own stock options for some of Russia's biggest companies and the rights to loans worth hundreds of millions of dollars. In 2008, a company controlled by Roldugin joined with several other offshore companies to help "another Putin insider" acquire control of Kamaz, Russia's largest truck manufacturer, and obtain investment from German carmaker Daimler AG, $250 million for 10% of Kamaz. Sandalwood, another company in which Roldugin and other insiders have an interest was issued lines of credit between 2009 and 2012 worth $800,000 by Russian Commercial Bank (RCB) in Cyprus, then a wholly owned subsidiary of VTB Bank, largely owned by the Russian state. Panama Papers documents indicate that Roldugin companies received several loans with no collateral, or at very low interest rates, or never repaid. In 2013, several shell companies linked to the brothers Boris and Arkady Rotenberg loaned worth about US$200 million to a company in Roldugin's network. The leaked documents do not show whether they were repaid. Shortly before the loan was granted, Arkady Rotenberg's company had been awarded the tender for the South Stream pipeline project, worth billions. Asked about his companies, Rodulgin said "I have to take a look and find out what I can say and what I can't", and that financial matters are "delicate".

Putin's spokesperson Dmitry Peskov called Western reporting of the Panama Papers "Putinophobia", said that they target Putin and are part of a conspiracy against Russia orchestrated by the Central Intelligence Agency, the United States Department of State and others.

Putin denied "any element of corruption", and said his opponents are trying to destabilize Russia. Putin also said: "WikiLeaks has showed us that official people and official organs of the US are behind this." On 2016's annual Direct Line with Vladimir Putin, he called the leaked documents "reliable" but confined his comments to Roldugin, saying that Western media did not understand that the musician has spent all his off-shore income on "musical instruments for Russia". Putin also said Goldman Sachs owned shares in the parent company of Süddeutsche Zeitung, which is in fact owned by a Munich family and a German media group. The Kremlin apologized for this "mistake".

Initially, mainstream Russian media almost entirely ignored the leak. Neither state-owned Channel 1 and Rossiya 1, nor privately owned REN-TV and NTV, mentioned the story on April 4, the day the story broke. The minimal coverage of the story ran in the middle of the night on Vesti TV and was in relation to Lionel Messi and Michel Platini. An exception was the Russian opposition newspaper Novaya Gazeta, described as "the ICIJ's Russian partner", which reported on the story both in hard copy and online.

By the end of April OCCRP published an analysis of a further batch of the leaked documents demonstrating a cash flow to the Rodulgin accounts from the 2007 tax theft of $230m by Moscow tax inspectors uncovered and reported by Sergei Magnitsky.

== Spain ==
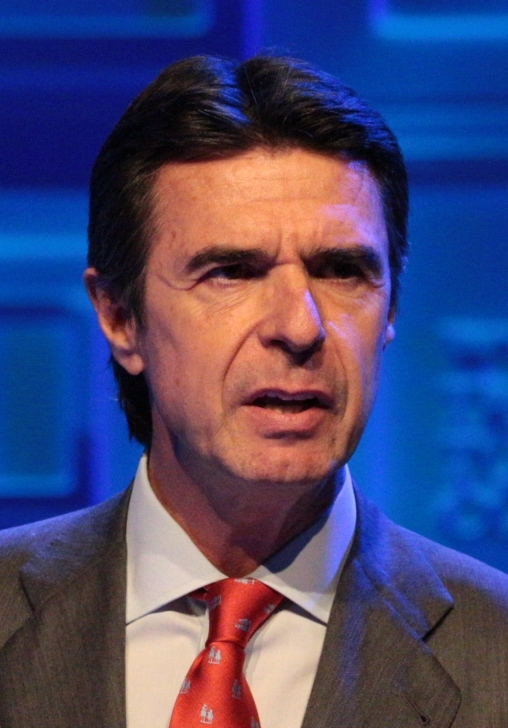
José Manuel Soria, Minister of Industry of Spain, resigned on April 15, 2016.

On April 15, 2016, José Manuel Soria was forced to leave his post as acting Minister of Industry, Energy and Tourism when the Panama Papers revealed that he and his family had maintained several offshore societies in tax havens during the previous decades. Soria initially denied this, but reports kept leaking that contradicted him. On April 14, a company came to light that he had owned in Jersey until 2002, while mayor of Las Palmas. Soria was put in a critical political position as a result of his confusing and changing explanations on the issue, and resigned the next day.

He is not the only prominent Spanish politician who had offshore companies.

Former IMF president Rodrigo Rato, vice-president in the conservative government of Prime Minister José María Aznar, had more than €3.6 million in two offshore companies. He has been charged by Spain with alleged tax offenses, money laundering and corruption among individuals in other cases of corruption. Micaela Domecq-Solís, the wife of Miguel Arias Cañete, currently the European Commissioner for Climate Action and Energy and formerly the EU Minister of Agriculture, Food and Environment, also opened shell societies.

The Spanish Royal Family is also involved in this tax scandal: Princess Pilar of Borbón, Duchess of Badajoz, sister of former King Juan Carlos I and aunt of the current King, Felipe VI, had an offshore corporation for 40 years, until the abdication of her brother. She assembled a company called Delantera Financiera, in 1974, and was its president and administrator. She initially denied this when her name appeared in the Panama Papers. Her husband, who died in 1991, was secretary-general of the corporation. His son, Bruno Gomez-Acebes, is treasurer and manager of this company. The name of Amalio de Marichalar, the count of Ripalda and the brother of Jaime de Marichalar, the former husband of the king's daughter, Elena de Borbón, also appears.

Moreover, in a huge corruption scandal involving the royal house, Iñaki Urdangarin and his business associate in the Nóos foundation, were advised by Mossack Fonseca to move funds.

Two great-grandchildren of the dictator Francisco Franco, Francisco and Juan José Franco Suelves set up registered societies in the British Virgin Islands through Mossack Fonseca. Juan José Franco opened Malini Investments in 1997, being director in 2012 and closed in 2013. He told the newspaper El Confidencial he was "absolutely ignorant". Francisco Franco Suelves, his older brother, also opened Vamfield Alliance Limited in 1997 as a director.

Oleguer Pujol, son of Jordi Pujol, former President of the Generalitat of Catalonia, granted the diversion of a commission of 6.8 million euros from the sale of an office to an opaque society, which repaid, with another offshore company, about 5 million more. His Pujol family, parents and children, are charged with several counts of tax fraud and corruption, among other crimes.

The current wife of former prime minister of Spain Felipe González, María García Vaquero, opened an account in Switzerland for Carmingo Ltd in 2004 in the tax haven of Niue, an island in the South Pacific. The lawyer Cándido Conde-Pumpido Jr., son of former General Prosecutor of Spain and magistrate of the Supreme Court of Spain, Cándido Conde-Pumpido, asked to open a Mossack Fonseca offshore company in 2008, though the transaction wasn't completed. He had intended the offshore company to be an intermediary in a project to build a skyscraper in the capital of Panama, not to hide money.

Francisco Paesa, an important spy for the CNI, while working for the Ministry of Interior, opened an offshore account after faking his death in 1998.

Top bankers and Spanish businessmen used this firm to open accounts and companies: Miguel Blesa, president of Caja Madrid, tried in Spanish courts for numerous cases of corruption, Jesus Barderas, a businessman close to ex-prime minister Felipe González, children of the lawyer Javier de la Rosa, who also is linked to corruption cases, Carlos Ortega, CEO of Pepe Jeans, and families with major hotel chains such as the Riu (RIU Hotels & Resorts), the Escarrer (Meliá Hotels International) and the Martinón (Group Martinón).

Art collectors Marina Ruiz-Picasso and Borja Thyssen have Mossack Fonseca companies. Thyssen's lawyer said his company was fully declared to tax authorities and Ruiz-Picasso declined comment. Other celebrities involved include Spanish director Pedro Almodóvar, who won an Oscar in 2003 for Habla con ella and with his brother Agustin created a company in 1991 called Glen Valley in the British Virgin Islands. Agustin responded saying he closed the company in 1994 and it paid all of its taxes.

Showbiz personality Carmen Lomana said that after the death of her husband, the owner of the offshore company, she took care of it but without knowing anything at all about the business or about tax. Bertín Osborne, host and Spanish singer, and the famous actor Imanol Arias, protagonist of one of the longest and most important series of Spanish television, Cuéntame cómo pasó, were named. Osborne said his account was legal and that he used it as recommended, to save money. He is also involved in a scandal over fraud to the Treasury, with actress and fellow protagonist on the series, Ana Duato.

Juan Luis Cebrián, journalist, co-founder of El País, and CEO of Prisa, a Spanish media conglomerate, owns 2% of Star Petroleum, a related oil corporation with tax havens. After being named, he decided to take legal action against La Sexta, who revealed his involvement in this scandal.

The former president of FC Barcelona, Josep Lluís Núñez, the current vice president, Carles Vilarrubí, and Eduardo Fernando de Blas, the vice president of Real Madrid, had offshore companies with Mossack Fonseca.

== Sweden ==
The Swedish Financial Supervisory Authority (FI) said on April 4, 2016, it would investigate the actions of Nordea, one of the largest financial institutions in the Nordic countries, after the Panama Papers revealed the bank's Luxembourg office had helped to set up nearly 400 offshore companies for its clients between 2004 and 2014 in Panama and the British Virgin Islands for their customers.

The Swedish Financial Supervisory Authority (FI) has said that "serious deficiencies" exist in how Nordea monitors for money laundering, and had given the bank two warnings. In 2015 Nordea had to pay the largest possible fine—over five million EUR. In 2012 Nordea asked Mossack Fonseca to change documents retroactively so that three Danish customers' power of attorney documents would appear to have been in force since 2010. The director for Nordea Private Banking, Thorben Sanders, has admitted that before 2009 Nordea did not screen for tax evaders: "In the end of 2009 we decided that our bank shall not be a means of tax evasion," said Sanders. Other Swedish banks are also present in the documents, but Nordea occurs 10,902 times and the next most frequently mentioned bank only occurs 764 times. The Swedish Financial Supervisory Authority (FI) later said that they would also investigate the other three big banks in Sweden: Handelsbanken, Skandinaviska Enskilda Banken (SEB) and Swedbank.

Nordea cut all ties with Mossack Fonseca following an interview with Nordea CEO Casper von Koskull on SVT on April 4.

In response to the leaks, Prime Minister Stefan Löfven said he is very critical of Nordea's conduct and role, and Minister of Finance Magdalena Andersson characterized the bank's conduct as "totally unacceptable".

== Switzerland ==
On April 6, the federal police searched UEFA headquarters in Nyon as part of a "criminal mismanagement" probe into a Champions League television rights deal signed by FIFA's new president Gianni Infantino. The same day, Geneva's attorney general opened several procedures in reaction to a report about misconduct by Swiss lawyers and trustees.

On April 8, a few hours after the publication of a new series of articles focusing on art hidden behind offshore companies, a prosecutor sequestered a Modigliani worth some $25 million at Geneva Freeport. Litigation in New York alleged the painting had been stolen by Nazis during World War II; the defendants said they did not own it, but the leaked documents show that they control International Art Center, a shell company registered in Panama which does own it.

Yves Bouvier and Russian billionaire Dmitry Rybolovlev, in litigation over art pricing, both have Mossack Fonseca companies.

The leaked papers also shed light on the ownership of shell companies in protracted litigation in Lausanne over ownership of artwork from the Gstaad chalet of the late Greek shipping tycoon Basil Goulandris.

On April 11, another investigation into the abuse of the name of charities like the Red Cross or WWF was launched.

Swiss-based Diacore is a Mossack Fonseca client, and has approximately thirty companies through them. Diacore is run by Daniel Steinmetz, but until recently his brother Beny Steinmetz had a power of attorney for the company. Diacore is part of the Steinmetz Group.

According to ICIJ, 1,339 Swiss lawyers, financial advisors and other middlemen had set up more than 38,000 offshore entities over the last 40 years. These entities listed 4,595 Swiss-linked officers or administrators.

== Ukraine ==
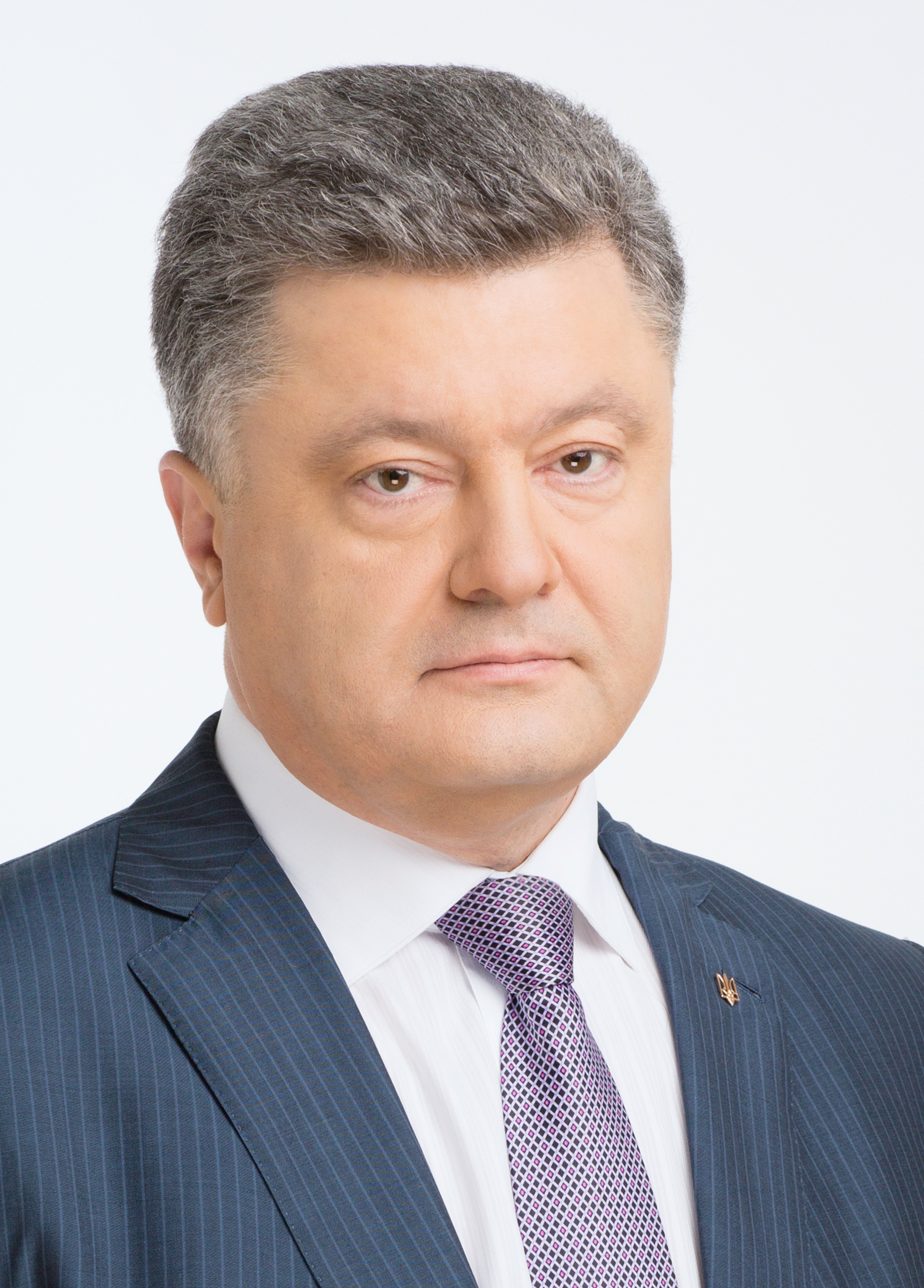
Ukrainian President Petro Poroshenko

When Ukrainian President Petro Poroshenko took office in 2014, a popular uprising had just toppled his predecessor, Viktor Yanukovych. Poroshenko pledged to sell his candy business (Roshen) if elected, but leaked documents indicate that on August 21, 2014 he instead had Mossack Fonseca set up offshore holding company Prime Asset Partners Ltd in the British Virgin Islands and moved his company there, roughly two months after the election. The move had the potential to save him millions of dollars on his Ukrainian taxes. Records in Cyprus show him as the firm's only shareholder. Some legal experts say the explanation may be sound; however this isn't making a difference to Ukrainian media making the point that Poroshenko opened his offshore account in August 2014 as Ukrainian soldiers were being massacred by the Russians in Ilovaisk. The Panama Papers report may also have figured in the defeat of a trade deal with the Netherlands in a referendum there on April 6.

Anti-corruption group Transparency International believes that the "creation of businesses while serving as president is a direct violation of the constitution". Also, journalists from the Organized Crime and Corruption Reporting Project believe that with the move Poroshenko committed two other illegalities, starting a new business while in office and failing afterwards to report it on his disclosure statements. Poroshenko denied any wrongdoing and a spokesman said the offshore company had no active assets and was a legitimate corporate restructure aimed at helping to sell Poroshenko's Roshen group. Analysts in Ukraine responded that the secretive way Poroshenko set up these accounts was certain to undermine trust in him, his party and Ukraine itself.

The news about Poroshenko's offshore business came as his government campaigned against offshore companies. Oleh Lyashko, leader of the Radical Party, urged lawmakers to begin impeachment proceedings, and even some of his allies backed calls for a parliamentary commission to investigate the allegations.

In the Ukrainian Parliament, relations between the Poroshenko bloc and the People's Front party of Prime Minister Arseniy Yatsenyuk had over previous months already soured, with mutual accusations of corruption. Prime Minister Arseniy Yatsenyuk also announced he would resign over the Panama Papers leaks.

== United Kingdom ==
The then British prime minister David Cameron. Jeremy Corbyn, the Leader of the Opposition, called for an immediate independent investigation into the tax affairs of Cameron's family.

According to The Guardian, "More than £170bn of UK property is now held overseas. ... Nearly one in 10 of the 31,000 tax haven companies that own British property are linked to Mossack Fonseca."

Included among the Panama Paper documents are the names of six members of the House of Lords, several of whom have been donors to Cameron's Conservative Party, as well as other Conservative donors. These include:

- Anthony Bamford: £4 million in Conservative Party donations, made a Conservative life peer in 2013;
- David Rowland: £3.8 million in Conservative Party donations, former party treasurer;
- Fleming Family & Partners: Over £400,000 in Conservative Party donations, including direct donations to David Cameron;
- Juniper Equities Trading: £250,000 loan to the Conservative Party from an offshore fund with an opaque ownership structure;
- Tony Buckingham: £100,000 donation to the Conservative Party;
- Lord Ashcroft: the man who published "piggate" allegations about Cameron;
- Baroness Pamela Sharples (via her Bahamas company Nunswell Investments Limited): made a life peer in 1973;
- Former MP Michael Mates via his company Haylandale: claimed his company "never had any real value" and registered interests with Parliament.

As the United Kingdom still exercises varying degrees of control over British Overseas Territories and Crown dependencies which make up a large number of the many tax havens and "secrecy jurisdictions" that exist, pressure mounted on Prime Minister David Cameron to make changes. According to The Wall Street Journal, the Panama Papers "are shining a light on the constellation of offshore centers in the last remnants of the British Empire, from Gibraltar to the British Virgin Islands (BVI)." Of the companies created by Mossack Fonseca which were included in the leaked data, the BVI companies topped the list, with 113,000 of the nearly 215,000 companies that Mossack Fonseca managed or incorporated there. British Overseas Territory Anguilla was 7th on the list.

Cameron criticized complex offshore structures in 2013, saying that it is "not fair and not right what some [companies] are doing by saying 'I've got lots of sales here in the UK but I'm going to pay a sort of royalty fee to another company that I own in another country that has some special tax dispensation.'" He said he would bring up the issue at the G8 summit that year. At the summit, Cameron demanded more transparency, arguing that it would be better for business. In 2014, Cameron asked all Overseas Territories and Crown dependencies to set up an open register of firms and individuals with investments registered in their jurisdictions, but by the time of the Panama Papers leak in April 2016, only Montserrat and Gibraltar had agreed to do so.

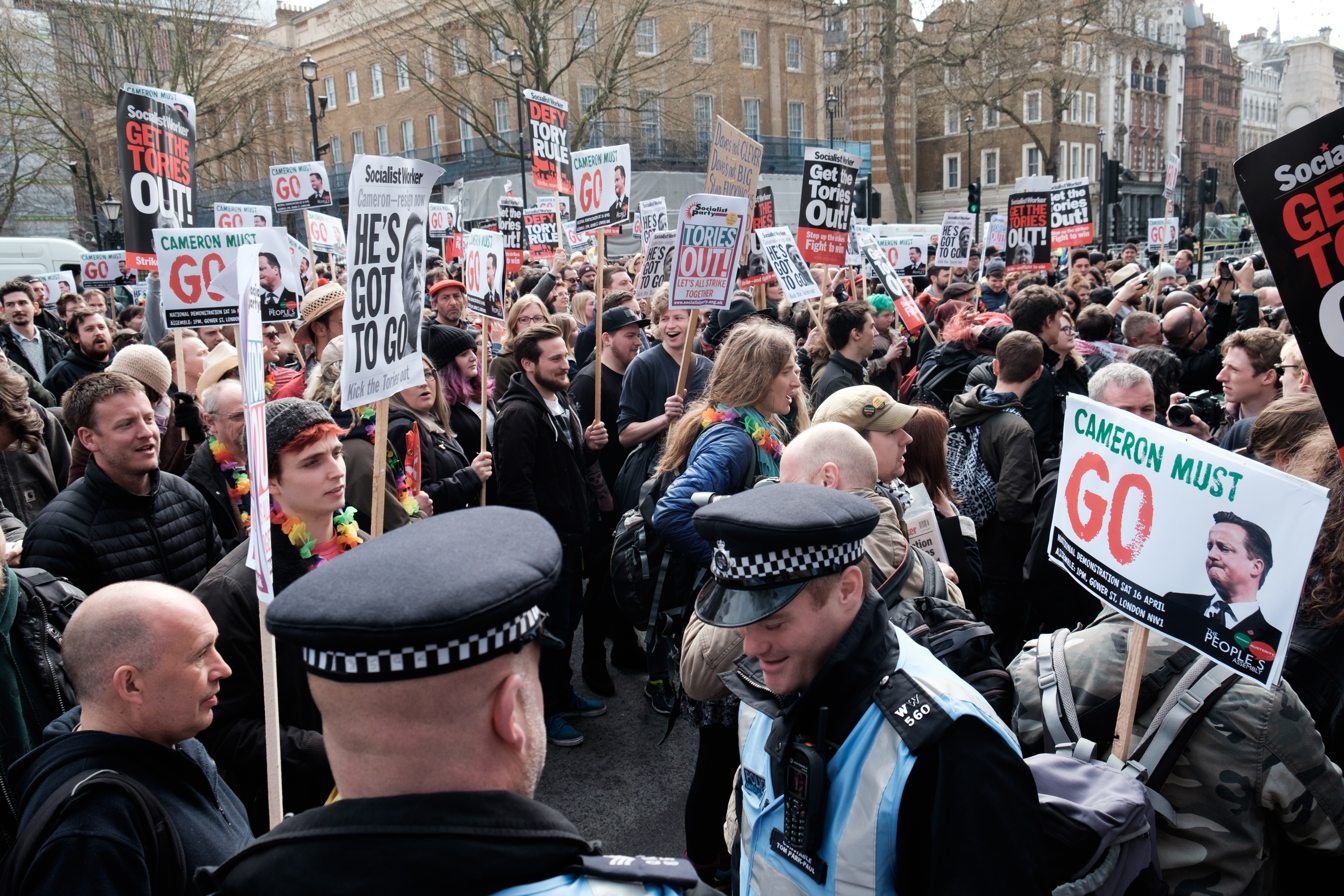
Protesters outside 10 Downing Street call for David Cameron's resignation, April 9, 2016

Leader of the Opposition Jeremy Corbyn said "The government needs to stop pussyfooting around on tax dodging" and called for "direct rule" to be imposed over British Overseas Territories and Crown dependencies that act as tax havens. Former Business Secretary Vince Cable agreed, although former attorney general Dominic Grieve described the proposal as a "bit of a nuclear option" which would "destroy the livelihoods" of BVI inhabitants in the finance industry. The Labour Party also said that Cameron's planned "anti-corruption" summit in May would be "a charade" if Cameron, as chairman of the summit, did not require representatives of all Crown dependencies and overseas territories to attend.

Jennie Granger, a spokeswoman for HMRC, said that the department had received "a great deal of information on offshore companies, including in Panama, from a wide range of sources, which is currently the subject of intensive investigation". She said HMRC had asked ICIJ to share all its data.

Private Eye revealed that Edward Troup, appointed executive chair of HMRC in April 2016, was a former partner with Simmons & Simmons, the London-based legal firm whose clients included the Panama-registered fund created by David Cameron's father, Blairmore Holdings. Papers obtained by the Süddeutsche Zeitung and ICIJ reveal Simmons & Simmons' close relationship with running offshore companies and major overseas property owners, including an investment company run on behalf of Sheikh Hamad bin Abdullah Al Thani, while Troup was its senior tax partner.

=== Blairmore Holdings, Inc. ===
Ian Cameron, the late father of UK Prime Minister David Cameron, ran an offshore fund (Blairmore Holdings, Inc.) through Mossack Fonseca that avoided UK taxes for 30 years. His company moved to Ireland after David Cameron became prime minister. On April 6, Cameron admitted that he had owned shares in Blairmore, but said he sold his shares before becoming PM.

Prominent politicians criticized the involvement of the Cameron family in the scandal; Leader of the Opposition Jeremy Corbyn urged an immediate independent investigation into the tax affairs of Cameron's family as well as tighter laws on UK tax avoidance.
