= Financial Intelligence Analysis Unit =

Maltese intelligence agency

- Analiżi ta' intelliġenza finanzjarja

Agency overview
- Formed: October 1, 2002
- Jurisdiction: Malta
- Headquarters: Financial Intelligence Unit, 65C, Tower Road, Birkirkara, BKR 4012
- Employees: 136
- Annual budget: €11.5 million
- Website: fiaumalta.org

The Financial Intelligence Analysis Unit (FIAU) is the national central agency in Malta responsible for receiving, analyzing, and disseminating financial intelligence to combat money laundering and terrorism financing. It was founded on October 1, 2002. The FIAU is an independent government agency. It operates as the national financial intelligence unit (FIU) in compliance with international standards and frameworks.

Under the European Union policy framework, the FIAU provides the permanent single common representative for Malta in both the Supervisory composition and the FIU composition of the General Board of the Anti-Money Laundering Authority (AMLA).

== Powers and functions ==
The FIAU collects financial intelligence and passes it on to the police, who can then carry out criminal investigations or arrest/prosecute any person. The FIAU also exchanges information with foreign financial intelligence agencies and supervisory authorities in Malta or overseas to investigate suspicious financial activities.

As an administrative intelligence agency, FIAU can demand and collect information from any individual, authority, or entity, including the police, government ministry, public department/agency, and any supervisory authority. Such a demand for information "overrides any obligation of secrecy or confidentiality under any other law."

FIAU operates independently and its activities are not disclosed on the public domain.

== Activities ==
In 2022, FIAU organized its first international conference of bank account register administrators and other specialists from 21 European countries, which was endorsed by the European Commission.

== Notable cases and controversies ==
According to its 2019 annual report, the FIAU forwarded 61 cases of money laundering to the police for investigation. In addition, it received more than 2,500 suspicious transaction reports from banks, legal professionals, casinos, gaming companies and real estate agencies, up by 65% from the previous year.

The Financial Intelligence Analysis Unit operates opposite Malta's financial entities. One of its primary responsibilities is enforcing Anti-Money Laundering (AML) legislation. Over the years, the FIAU expanded the criteria for violations under said legislation, leading to increased administrative penalties. Administrative penalties in 2021 increased to €12.4 million from €4.7 million in 2020, creating speculations among experts in the financial sector that FIAU is enjoying the "moral authority to impose fines."

The FIAU gained media attention due to its case against Pilatus Bank in 2018. In September 2022, Pilatus Bank owner Ali Sadr Hasheminejad, won his case in front of the International Centre for Settlement of Investment Disputes, which recommended a suspension of all proceedings by Malta against Ali Sadr until it decided on the case, after he claimed that he was wrongfully prosecuted by the Maltese financial authorities.

== See also ==
- Malta Financial Services Authority
