= Malta Financial Services Authority =

Financial regulator of Malta

- Awtorità għas-Servizzi Finanzjarji ta’ Malta

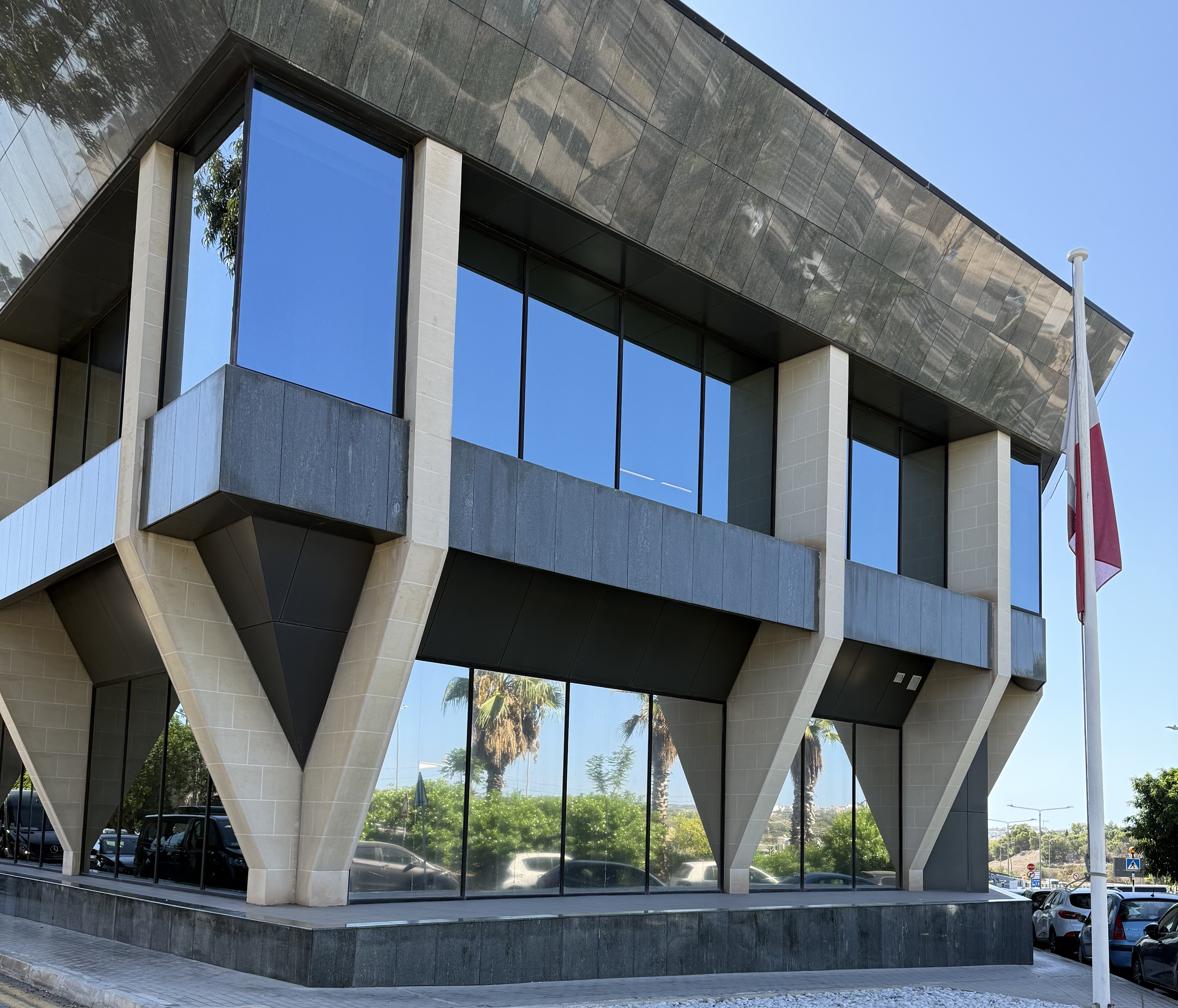

Agency overview
- Formed: 23 July 2002
- Preceding agency: Malta Financial Services Centre
- Jurisdiction: Malta
- Headquarters: Triq l-Imdina, Zone 1 Central Business District, Birkirkara
- Employees: 307
- Annual budget: €26 million (yearly average)
- Agency executives: Jesmond Gatt, Chairman; Kenneth Farrugia, Chief Executive Officer
- Key document: Malta Financial Services Authority Act
- Website: www.mfsa.mt

The Malta Financial Services Authority (MFSA) is the main financial supervisory authority of Malta, based in Birkirkara. It supervises banking, investment, insurance, financial, pension companies and securities markets in Malta, and monitors financial crime in liaison with the Financial Intelligence Analysis Unit. It was established in 2002, succeeding the Malta International Business Authority (MIBA, 1988-1994) and the Malta Financial Services Centre (MFSC, 1994-2002) and also taking over prudential and market supervisory duties previously under the Central Bank of Malta.

Under European Union policy frameworks, the MFSA is the national competent authority for Malta within European Banking Supervision. It is a voting member of the respective Boards of Supervisors of the European Banking Authority (EBA), European Insurance and Occupational Pensions Authority (EIOPA), and European Securities and Markets Authority (ESMA). It is Malta's designated National Resolution Authority and plenary session member of the Single Resolution Board (SRB). It is also a member of the European Systemic Risk Board (ESRB).

== History ==
=== Background ===
A formal framework of financial regulation developed gradually in Malta following the country's independence in 1964. The Central Bank of Malta (CBM) was created in 1968 out of the prior Board of Commissioners of Currency. In 1970, the CBM was empowered with supervision of the banking sector.

In its early years as an independent republic under long-serving prime minister Dom Mintoff, Malta's economic policy was oriented towards domestic manufacturing-led development supported by heavy-handed state intervention. Following the electoral victory of the Nationalist Party in 1987, Malta started pivoting towards a new model as an offshore financial centre and enacted the Malta International Business Activities Act in 1988 to that effect. Meanwhile, legislation in 1990 granted the CBM supervisory authority over the Malta Stock Exchange.

=== Malta International Business Authority ===
The MIBA was established in early 1989 as the International Business Activities Act entered into force. It functioned as a company register for offshore businesses, which at the outset were clearly separated from domestic ones in terms of applicable regulations.

=== Malta Financial Services Centre ===
In 1994, the Nationalist government adopted a new orientation that partly reversed its prior development of Malta as an offshore financial center, not least as it increasingly favored future membership of the European Union. In that phase, the distinction between offshore and domestic businesses was eroded. The MIBA was correspondingly reorganized as a general-purpose financial supervisory authority and renamed as the MFSC. In 1995, it moved into its current building in the Mrieħel business district of Birkirkara.

=== Malta Financial Services Authority ===
Upon establishment in 2002, the MFSA took up the operations of the prior MFSC and also the supervisory duties of the CBM.

The Registry of Companies, representing the core of the original activity of MIBA in 1988, was demerged from the MFSA in 2018, so that the latter would focus on its regulatory duties. The Registry of Companies thus became a stand-alone agency and was renamed the Malta Business Registry (MBR).

== Powers ==
The MFSA has the powers to regulate, monitor, and supervise the financial sector of Malta, protecting the interests of the consumers and promoting the market transparency and efficiency. It has the powers to review business practices, advise the government on policies, and to investigate potential harmful and unfair practices in the financial industry.

== International relations ==
The MFSA is a member of the European Banking Authority, the European Insurance and Occupational Pensions Authority, the European Securities and Markets Authority, the International Organization of Securities Commissions, and the International Association of Insurance Supervisors.

== Controversy ==
In June 2016, the MFSA drew criticism from the MEP Sven Giegold for poor regulatory supervision of the Maltese financial institutions.

In 2018, Joseph Cuschieri was appointed as CEO of the Malta Financial Services Authority. He started his position accompanied by his close friend Edwina Licari, and during their time at the MFSA, they had more than 35 “business trips” together, where €0.5 million from taxpayers’ money were spent. In 2020, Joseph Cuschieri decided to resign from the role due to the revelations of his closeness with Yorgen Fenech, the main suspect behind the assassination of journalist and anti-corruption activist Daphne Caruana. Edwina Licari still works at MFSA as a General Counsel with a high annual salary of €100,000.

In March 2018, the MFSA took control of Pilatus Bank, a Maltese bank headed by Ali Sadr Hasheminejad, whose money laundering scheme of sanctioned Iranian money was exposed by late Daphne Caruana Galizia. Later, in June, the MFSA asked the European Central Bank to withdraw Pilatus Bank's licence. In July of the same year, Pilatus Bank's depositors threatened to sue the MFSA for freezing €80 million in funds held by innocent victims. In October, the bank's directors followed with their own lawsuit to the MFSA. In November 2018, the bank's European licence has been withdrawn by the ECB.

In October 2018, the MFSA froze the assets of SataBank due to anti-money laundering concerns. The freeze resulted in vocal criticism of the bank's account holders. The bank is co-owned by Christo Georgiev, the owner of LeoPay startup.

In August 2019, the Malta Financial Services Authority became embroiled in scandal after paying €150,000 severance to its human resources department director, George Spiteri, who later was rehired for a similar position by the Malta Business Registry, which had branched out of the MFSA just a few weeks earlier.

== Leadership ==
- Joseph (Joe) Bannister, MFSC chairman 1995–1997 and 1999–2002, then MFSA chairman 2002-2018
- André Camilleri, Director General of MFSC then MFSA 1995–2014
- Edward Scicluna, MFSC chairman 1997–1999
- Marianne Scicluna, MFSA Director General 2014–2018
- John Mamo, chairman 2018–2023
- Joseph Cuschieri, CEO 2018–2020
- Christopher Buttigieg, Acting CEO 2020–2021
- Joseph Gavin, CEO 2021–2022
- Michele Mizzi, Acting CEO 2022–2023
- Jesmond Gatt, chairman since 2023
- Kenneth Farrugia, CEO since 2023

== See also ==
- List of financial supervisory authorities by country
