= Amelia Rueda =

Costa Rican journalist

Amelia Rueda Ahumada, born in Buenos Aires on October 3, 1951, is a Costa Rican journalist who began her career in 1974 and has been practicing for more than 40 years.

== Career ==
She has worked in different media outlets including:

- Telenoticias Canal 7
- Canal 2: First in Contacto Directo and then in Noticiero Univisión
- Repretel 6: Esta Mañana and Aló qué tal?

Currently, she is the information director of the company Central de Radios and hosts the program Nuestra Voz (Our Voice).

She was involved in the investigation carried out at the Panamanian law firm Mossack Fonseca in relation to the documents called "Panama Papers". This research was developed by the Semanario Universidad in conjunction with ameliarueda.com.

== Awards ==
- Ángela Acuña Braun Award for gender issues
- UNICEF Award for Communication
- Award for best program director and scriptwriter for Our Voice on Radio Monumental
- Golden Microphone by the Federation of Radio and Television Associations of Spain (2003).
