= Joselyn Chacón =

Costa Rican politician

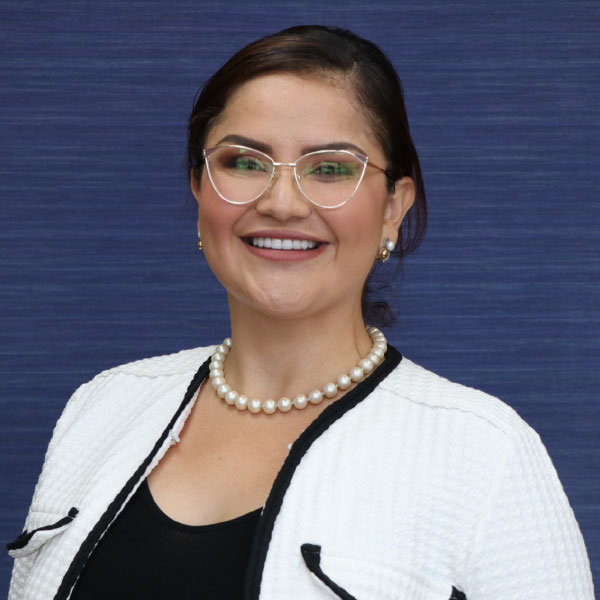

Minister of Public Health of Costa Rica
- In office 8 May 2022 – 7 February 2023
- President: Rodrigo Chaves Robles
- Preceded by: Ileana Vargas González
- Succeeded by: Mary Munive Angermüller

Personal details
- Born: Joselyn María Chacón Madrigal; July 25, 1991 (age 35) San Jose, Costa Rica
- Party: Social Democratic Progress Party
- Parent(s): José Chacón Sibaja; Aida Madrigal García
- Education: Universidad Latina de Costa Rica; Universidad Centroamericana de Gestión Pública; Universidad Europea del Atlántico
- Profession: Physician, politician

Joselyn María Chacón Madrigal (born 25 July 1991 in Hospital, San José, Costa Rica) is a Costa Rican physician and politician. She served as Minister of Public Health of Costa Rica during the administration of President Rodrigo Chaves Robles from 8 May 2022 to 7 February 2023.

== Early life and education ==
Chacón was born to José Chacón Sibaja and Aida Madrigal García. She completed her secondary education at the Academic High School of Puriscal. She earned her degree in Medicine and Surgery from the Universidad Latina de Costa Rica in 2017. In 2018, she obtained a master's degree in health services administration from Universidad Santa Lucía, and in 2020, she earned a diploma in hospital care quality management from the Universidad Centroamericana de Gestión Pública.

== Medical career ==
In 2016, she completed her rotating internship in surgery and internal medicine at Hospital Monseñor Sanabria in Puntarenas, in family and community medicine at Clínica San Rafael de Puntarenas, and in gynecology, obstetrics, and pediatrics at Hospital San Rafael de Alajuela.

From 2017 to 2018, she served her social service as a general practitioner at the EBAIS clinic in Paracito, Moravia. From July to November 2018, she worked as a general practitioner in the Goicoechea 2 Health Area. From November 2018 to 2019, she was an administrative medical assistant at Hospital México's General Directorate. From 2019 to 2022, she was a medical assistant in the Department of Hemato-Oncology and Radiotherapy at the same hospital.

She ran as a candidate for deputy with the Social Democratic Progress Party representing San José province in the 2022 Costa Rican general election. Though not elected, she served as the campaign manager for Rodrigo Chaves Robles in the second round of the election.

== Tenure as Minister ==
After Rodrigo Chávez's victory in the runoff election, Chacón was appointed Minister of Public Health and took office on 8 May 2022. That same day, she announced new decrees lifting the mandatory use of face masks and COVID-19 vaccination requirements. The announcement was criticized, as such decisions should have been made by the National Vaccination and Epidemiology Commission (CNVE), which had not issued such a resolution. The decrees were published on 11 November and confirmed that vaccination mandates remained in effect.

During her time at the Ministry, Chacón issued decrees to lower the cost of medications through drug approval harmonization, enable parallel imports of health-related products, and fortify rice with nutrients. She also introduced policies to reduce waiting times for mammograms and supported a national digital health strategy.

== Resignation ==
Chacón resigned as Minister of Health on 7 February 2023, citing "personal and force majeure reasons". On the same day, the Office of the Attorney General of Costa Rica requested a certified copy of a legislative hearing transcript where Chacón admitted under oath to paying an Internet troll to "attack" three media outlets.
