= Malta Business Registry =

Maltese government agency for registering and regulating companies

- Reġistru tan-Negozju ta’ Malta
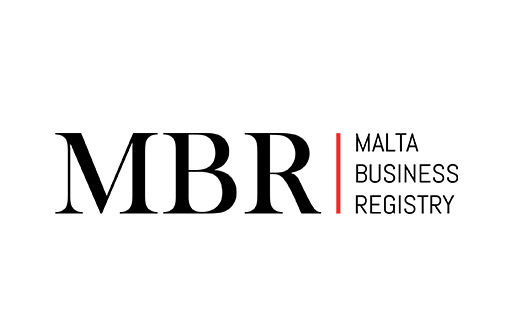

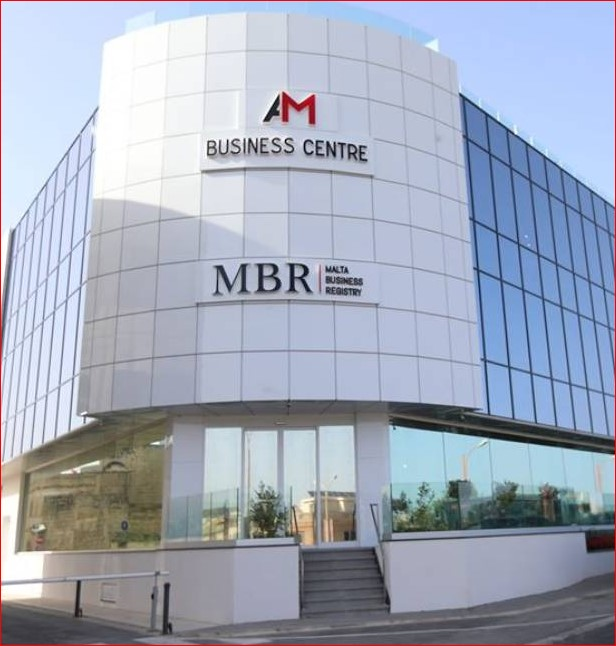
- Malta Business Registry Building

Agency overview
- Formed: 2018
- Preceding agency: Malta Registry of Companies
- Jurisdiction: Malta
- Headquarters: Malta Business Registry AM Business Centre, Triq il-Labour, Zejtun 2401, Malta
- Agency executive: Dr.Geraldine Spiteri Lucas, Registrar/Chief Executive Officer
- Key document: LEGISLATION 595.27 MALTA BUSINESS REGISTRY (ESTABLISHMENT AS AN AGENCY) ORDER
- Website: Official website

The Malta Business Registry is a Maltese government agency responsible for the registration and regulatory compliance of companies and commercial partnerships within its jurisdiction.

== Powers ==
The Malta Business Registry is responsible for the registration of new companies and commercial partnerships, the registration of documents related to commercial partnerships, the issuing of certified documentation including certificates of good-standing, the reservation of company names, the collection of registration and other fees, the publication of notices and the imposition and collection of penalties. The Registry is also charged with conducting investigations of companies and maintaining Malta's company and partnership register.

In 2020 additional investigative powers were granted to the Registry. A Compliance Unit was set up to conduct the screening of companies, investigate suspicious transactions and act on discrepancies found regarding the beneficial ownership of Maltese entities and their missing annual returns. 32 suspicious transactions reports were submitted by MBR’s money laundering reporting officer in 2020. New software systems also began screening foreign shareholders and changes in directorships that same year. Annual in-depth reviews of companies were subsequently doubled to 45,409 directors, shareholders and beneficial owners. Over eight hundred company applications were also rejected in 2021.

== History ==
Malta Business Registry's (MBR) functions were previously held by the Registry of Companies as part of the Malta Financial Services Authority (MFSA). The Registry of Companies became a stand-alone agency and was renamed the Malta Business Registry in 2018. Its new offices were inaugurated in Zejtun by then Prime Minister Joseph Muscat in June 2019. It was claimed that the MBR would be the first government agency to run on blockchain technology to increase transparency and reduce bureaucratic procedures. The Registry's online system, first developed in 2004, was slated for replacement by the end of 2020. The agency is expected to be fully digitised and paperless by 2021.

The agency had approximately 96,000 companies on its books in 2020 and reported a net increase of 4,472 new companies registered in 2019. MBR reported an operational surplus of €10 million on an income of €16 million for financial year 2019. Investments in fixed assets also totaled €6 million for the year.

The MBR underwent a change of leadership in October 2021. A financial surplus of nearly €12 million was reported that same year.

== Controversy ==
In 2019, Malta's anti-money laundering regime was found to be inadequate by an expert review of the Council of Europe (Moneyval). The OECD similarly noted a lack of relevant information on commercial entities and the low annual filing rates of companies. University of Malta research also confirmed a "tendency to comply only at a superficial level with the principles of good corporate governance" in Malta. This lack of transparency, it was argued, did not fully protect the interests of these entities' shareholders and trading partners.

Subsequently, legislation was enacted requiring the accurate publication of ownership and financial data of Malta-listed companies. Random sampling assessments were then initiated in Spring 2020 by the MBR and over 10,000 non-compliant entities were struck-off the registry. In July 2020, it was confirmed that 54,000 listed companies (out of circa 96,000) had complied fully with MBR regulations. It was separately reported that 13,498 companies had also missed the filing deadline to submit annual returns that year. One entity of which was said not to have filed a financial report since 2004.

Public access to beneficial ownership details of companies on the Maltese registry was restricted in November 2022 after a EU Court of Justice privacy ruling.

The lack of clarity regarding the government's procurement of MBR's new office building and its location has been repeatedly queried.
