= LeoPay =

LeoPay (previously LeuPay) is an e-wallet payment and financial platform that enables money transfers and offers clients multi-currency IBAN accounts.

Originally based in Malta, it is now operated by iCard Services AD in Bulgaria. It offers Visa debit cards.

In summer 2018, it rebranded from LeuPay to LeoPay.

On 22.10.2018 LeoPay terminated accounts of clients that are not EU residents with immediate effect. In the email sent out to the owners of the blocked accounts the company promised to redeem the remaining balances within 2 months.
