= Ali Sadr Hasheminejad =

Businessman

- Born: 9 February 1980 (age 46); Tehran, Iran
- Citizenship: Iran
- Education: Cornell University
- Years active: 2014–present

Ali Sadr Hashemi Nejad also known as Ali Sadr, is an American businessman.

In 2018, he fought federal charges brought against him for allegedly violating the U.S. sanctions against Iran in connection to a construction project of low-income housing in Venezuela in 2010.

After a two-year long legal battle, Sadr was exonerated and all the charges against him were "dismissed with prejudice" due to prosecutorial misconduct.
