= Joseph Cuschieri =

Maltese politician (born 1968)

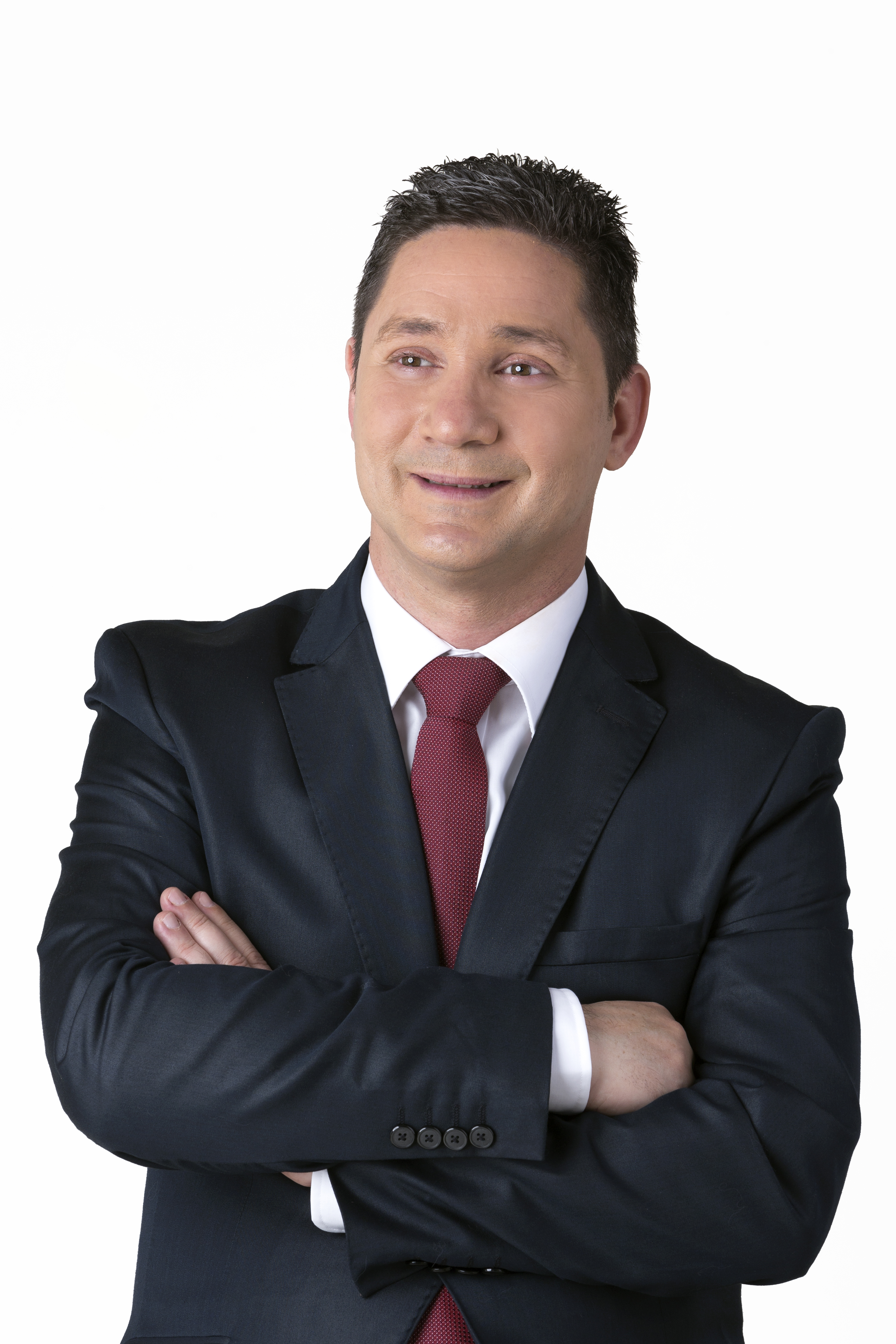

Member of the European Parliament
- In office 6 June 2009 (de facto); S&D Member - 1 December 2011 (de jure) – 30 June 2014
- Majority: 19,672

Member of Parliament
- In office Opposition Member 1998 – 2008
- Succeeded by: Joseph Muscat

St Julian's Local Council
- In office Deputy Mayor 1994 – 1996
- Succeeded by: Vincent Aquilina

Personal details
- Born: 20 February 1968 (age 58) Attard, Malta
- Party: Labour Party (Partit Laburista)
- Website: European Parliament; Facebook

Joseph Cuschieri (born February 20, 1968) is a Maltese politician who has been a Member of the European Parliament since 2011 - 2013. Previously he served in the House of Representatives of Malta from 1998 to 2008. In 1994 he was elected and nominated first Deputy Mayor of St Julian's. He was born in a working-class family and joined the Labour Party at a very early age.

== Background ==
Joseph Cuschieri was born in Attard. Before becoming a politician, he worked in the textile industry, at the dockyards, journalism and broadcasting, and tourism. He was one of the pioneers who set up Super One Radio (now ONE Radio), where he worked as a journalist and broadcaster. He was also the personal reporter for then Leader of the Malta Labour Party and Prime Minister, Dr Karmenu Mifsud Bonnici.

=== Political career ===
Joseph Cuschieri became active in the Labour Party at the age of 13 when he joined the Labour Youth League in Sliema, Malta.

=== As a Councillor and Vice Mayor ===
In 1994 he was elected and nominated first Deputy Mayor of St Julian's, after polling the largest number of votes among independent candidates. In the second local council elections in 1996 he was re-elected with the largest numbers of votes among all candidates.

=== As a Member of Parliament ===
Joseph Cuschieri was elected as an MP for three consecutive terms commencing 1998. He garnered a greater share of the vote in 2003 and then in 2008.

From 1998 to 2003 he served, alongside Charles Mangion, as spokesperson for Local Councils. From 2003 to 2008 he served with Karmenu Vella and Evarist Bartolo as spokesperson for tourism, Air Malta, and hotels industry. He was also appointed speaker for the Infrastructure and Capital Projects, together with Charles Buhagiar.

During his ten-year parliamentary career Joseph Cuschieri served on delegations to the United Kingdom, Isle of Man, Tunisia, Australia, South Korea, Germany, Palestine, Israel and Jordan, among others.

=== Altruistic resignation from the House of Representatives ===
On 29 September 2008 Joseph Cuschieri ceded his parliamentary seat to newly elected Labour leader Dr Joseph Muscat, who at that time was not a Maltese member of Parliament. Thus he made it possible for the new Labour Leader to carry out his duties as Leader of the Opposition in Parliament on behalf of the Malta Labour Party.

Joseph Muscat thanked Cuschieri for "his extraordinary and generous decision", and Charles Mangion, former Deputy Leader of the Labour Party for Parliamentary Affairs and acting Opposition Leader Charles Mangion, described Cuschieri as a hard worker and remarkably altruistic, calling his resignation historically and politically important for the country. Joseph Muscat was the Prime Minister of Malta between March 2013 and January 2020.

Following his resignation from Parliament, Cuschieri was elected unanimously as a member of the National Executive of the Labour Party.

=== Joseph Cuschieri as an MEP ===
Following the entry into force of the Protocol amending Protocol No 36, Joseph Cuschieri was designated as an MEP with effect from 1 December 2011 for the remainder of the 2009-2014 European Parliament parliamentary term.

Cuschieri has contested the 2009 European Parliament Elections and has garnered the 4th largest numbers of first count votes among all candidates.

In the European Parliament, Joseph Cuschieri was a member of the Progressive Alliance of Socialists and Democrats in the European Parliament and the Head of Delegation of the S&D Maltese members.

In the European Parliament, Cuschieri served as a member of the Committee on Transport and Tourism and a substitute member of the Committee on Regional Development. He was also a member on the Delegation for relations with the Arab Peninsula and the Delegation for relations with South Africa.

=== Diplomatic career ===
As of 21 January 2016, Joseph Cuschieri has been appointed Ambassador Extraordinary and Plenipotentiary of the Republic of Malta to the Hellenic Republic. He presented his Credentials to H.E. Prokopis Pavlopoulos, President of Greece.
