= Anthony Vella =

Maltese judge

Anthony J. Vella
- Incumbent
- Assumed office 2018

Personal details
- Born: 1965 (age 60–61)
- Education: University of Malta
- Profession: Judge

Anthony J. Vella (born 8 December 1965 in Malta) is a Maltese judge.

== Biography ==
=== Studies ===
Anthony Vella studied at Stella Maris School and St. Aloysius College. He subsequently read law at the University of Malta. Between 1988 and 1990 he presided the Students of Law Association and represented students on the Faculty Board. He graduated as Doctor of Law (LL.D.) in 1991. In 1997 he also gained a bachelor's degree in philosophy and theology and two years later earned a master's degree in financial services.

=== Member of the Judiciary ===
==== Magistrate ====
Vella was sworn in as magistrate by President Guido de Marco in 2004, upon recommendation of Prime Minister Lawrence Gonzi.

He worked for several years in Malta's family court.

In 2017-2018, Vella conducted the magisterial inquiry into the assassination of journalist Daphne Caruana Galizia, becoming "a household name" according to the Times of Malta.

==== Judge ====
In June 2018 Anthony Vella was appointed as Judge by President Marie-Louise Coleiro Preca upon recommendation of Prime Minister Joseph Muscat.

In his swearing-in ceremony he called to put an end to the distinction between Judges and Magistrates, stating that "the career of a magistrate should be a career in its own right".

== See also ==
- Judiciary of Malta
