= Corruption in Malta =

Corruption in Malta is a rampant problem which affects various sectors of the government and public services and is also rooted very deeply into social and political culture. It does not only undermine public trust in government institutions but also adversely affects economic development and the rule of law. Corruption in the Maltese islands has significantly increased since the Malta Labour Party returned to power in 2013. In fact, Malta's record of clean governance has decreased since 2013, and the country is now considered one of the worst EU member states in tackling corruption according to Transparency International. The same association reported that Malta dropped to its lowest ever ranking of 65th place in a report published in February 2025.

== Corruption scandals ==
An example of high-profile corruption case in Malta involved Steward Healthcare, an American healthcare company. It was awarded a €400 million contract to renovate and manage three state-owned hospitals into world-class healthcare providers within eight years. Allegations of fraud and corruption emerged and this involved high-ranking government officials such as the former prime minister Joseph Muscat. It was found through leaked emails that Steward Healthcare transferred millions of euros to Accutor, a Swiss firm that paid consultancy fees to Muscat. Although there is no direct evidence yet linking the payments as bribes to Muscat, Steward Healthcare's payments were passed off as consultancy payments to consultants such as the former prime minister. A criminal report later revealed that the company created a political support fund that diverted money from the hospital contract to Muscat and two other senior Maltese officials via Accutor and related firms. Steward Healthcare is also accused of conducting surveillance and disinformation operations against its critics.

Another corruption scandal that demonstrates the institutionalization of corruption in Malta involved the drug trafficking case of the Nigerian nationals Kofi Otule and Austine Uche in 2016. Allegations of judicial corruption stem from perceptions of inconsistencies in the evidence presented as well as questions of fairness and integrity on the part of involved authorities within the judicial system. In Otule and Uche's case, the court's decision to employ unreliable witness affected the length of the litigation process and also undermined the case brought against the defendants.

There is also the case of Christian Borg's acquittal for illegally hiring foreign workers. The case itself is insignificant compared to other infractions as Borg has been accused of using his car business to launder money from drug trafficking and criminal activities. None of these accusations have been refuted nor investigated.

Malta is also affected by the significant power of incumbency where the government hands out jobs by the thousands in order to ensure their support in elections. Even during a caretaker period, there are no restrictions on their ability to do this. Politicians offering to patients up the treatment line or paying for essential works on constituent's homes are also normalised.

Nepotism in Malta is also entrenched, especially in the business sector, such as the case where the former architect of developer Joseph Portelli joined the planning authority board deciding on permits and sanctions.

The criticism of the Maltese judicial system rests on its inefficiencies, particularly with regard to the length of time needed to resolve cases. Money laundering cases take the longest to close in the trial courts. In 2018, for instance, courts took about six years to litigate these cases and several of these still remain unresolved. A 2020 Council of Europe report supported this as it highlighted that criminal cases in Malta take two to eight times longer than the EU average. It is noted that court delays lessen the chances that the dispute will be justly decided and that corrupt actors evade consequences by delaying their case.

=== Cycle of corruption ===
Another corruption issue in Malta concerns the “revolving door” practice where individuals move from public office to private sector roles. The resulting intertwining of political and business interests perpetuates a cycle of corruption. Muscat's consultancy for companies like Steward Healthcare is an example. After he resigned due to the political fallout of the assassination of journalist Daphne Caruana Galizia, he transitioned into private consulting role and reportedly earned over €480,000 a year. In the revolving door phenomenon, public officials use insider knowledge and connections for personal gain.

== Police corruption ==
The Malta Police Force (MPF) is the main law enforcement authority in Malta. It is the responsibility of the MPF to "preserve public order and peace, to prevent, detect and investigate offences, to collect evidence", and to ultimately bring the offenders before the court. Further, the MPF obtains the duty of maintaining efforts in investigating the abuse of police power and undertakings of corrupt activity.

Unfortunately, for the Maltese community, it is common practice that there is a "code of silence" within the MPF, where an officer may "turn a blind eye" to the misconduct performed by their fellow officer. Typically, this behaviour is customary regardless of the severity of the consequence, as it heightens the likelihood of the corrupt officer reciprocating assistance, trust and support when needed.

Whilst over one-third of Maltese citizens believe that the MPF engage in police corruption, particularly acts of bribery and abuse of their legitimate power, this figure has significantly reduced from 2014. A nation’s corruption level can be determined through the Corruption Perception Index (CPI). The CPI ranks countries on how corrupt their public sector is perceived by the World Bank and the World Economic Forum. Malta's CIP is 5.7 out of ten, which indicates Malta is 54% better than the average. This achievement can be seen as an outcome of the Maltese Government initiating various preventive bodies and relevant legislation.

The Economic Crime Unit of the Malta Police Force was initiated in 1987, and is primarily involved in investigating and detecting a variety of corruption offences, including smuggling, fraud and bribery. The MPF and the Police Commissioner initiate all prosecutions in Malta. Thus, to ensure legitimacy across all prosecutions, the MPF are required to adhere to disciplinary rules and are bound by a Code of Ethics. Additionally, chapter 164 of the Maltese Police Act 1961 regulates the organisation, discipline and duties of the Malta Police Force. Specifically, section 7 of Article 33 Offences Against Discipline, provides a comprehensive list of activities undertaken by a member of the MPF that are considered to be "corrupt practices". Such "corrupt practices" include, but are not limited to: receiving any bribe; failing to promptly return any money or property received; improperly using their position as a police officer for "private advantage"; or, directly or indirectly requesting or receiving any gratuity without the consent of the Commissioner.

As corrupt practices are considered to be a serious punitive offence within Malta, if a member of the public submits a complaint regarding a minor corruption practice of a police officer, the Internal Affairs Unit will investigate. Alternatively, where allegations regard serious police corruption offences, the Economic Crime Unit will intervene, investigate and may consequently initiate criminal proceedings. However, from 1998, there have been few cases of police officers charged with corruption offences, consisting of five bribery prosecutions and six unlawful arrest cases.

To further ensure societal security from police corruption, the Permanent Commission Against Corruption (PCAC) was established in 1988. The PCAC entirely deals with investigations for alleged or suspected police corruption practices. The PCAC comprises one chairman, and two members who are selected by the Malta President and act on advice of the Prime Minister. Article 4 of Chapter 326 Permanent Commission Against Corruption Act 1988 highlights the functions of the commission, these include: considering and investigating alleged or suspected corrupt practices; investigating "the conduct of any public officer"; investigating "any person who is/has been entrusted with functions relating to the administration of a partnership where the Government has a controlling interest" and the Commission believes such conduct may be corrupt; investigating "practices and procedures of government departments where the Government has a controlling interest to facilitate the discovery of any corrupt practices"; and, to "instruct, advise and assist ministers who are entrusted with the administration of government departments where the government has a controlling interest on ways in which corrupt practices could be eliminated". Reports of the commission's findings are then submitted to the Minister of Justice.

== Impact ==
Corruption has eroded public confidence in Malta's governmental institutions and the rule of law. Transparency International’s Corruption Perceptions Index has posted a significant decline in Malta’s ranking since its high score of 60 in 2015 on a scale from 0 ("highly corrupt") to 100 ("very clean"). The country scored 51 in 2023 and 46 in 2024. The 2024 score was equivalent with countries considered “flawed democracies”, which posted an average score of 48 in the Index.

In 2025, Malta's score improved to 49. For comparison with regional scores, the best score among Western European and European Union countries (Note: Austria, Belgium, Bulgaria, Croatia, Cyprus, Czechia, Denmark, Estonia, Finland, France, Germany, Greece, Hungary, Iceland, Ireland, Italy, Latvia, Lithuania, Luxembourg, Malta, Netherlands, Norway, Poland, Portugal, Romania, Slovakia, Slovenia, Spain, Sweden, Switzerland, and the United Kingdom.) was 89, the average score was 64 and the worst score was 40. For comparison with worldwide scores, the best score was 89 (ranked 1), the average score was 42, and the worst score was 9 (ranked 181, in a two-way tie).

Inefficiencies in the governmental processes also lead to economic losses. This is evident in the state's procurement processes, which are commonly marred by irregularities and conflicts of interest. These hamper Malta's economic development.

There are anti-corruption measures in place that aim to curb corruption. However, there is a lack of a comprehensive legal framework that identifies and penalizes corruption. For example, to address the revolving door phenomenon, Malta instituted a policy in 2020 that bars certain public employees from engaging in profit-making activities for up to two years after leaving government service. However, this policy does not cover elected officials and Cabinet ministers, allowing them to exploit their previous roles in the government for personal gain.
