= Michelle Muscat =

Maltese First Lady

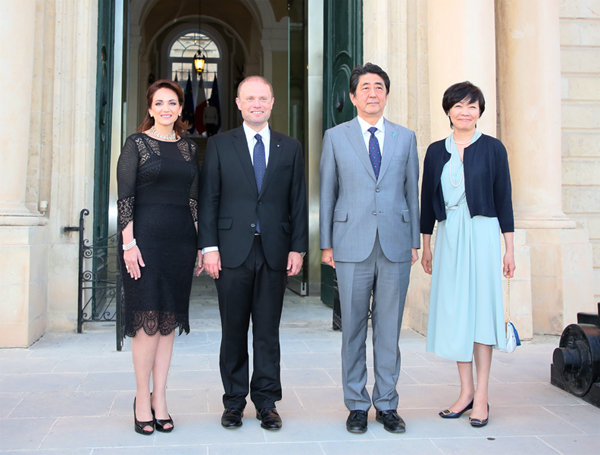
- Michelle Muscat, Joseph Muscat, Shinzō Abe und Akie Abe (left to right)
- Born: Michelle Tanti; May 16, 1974 (age 52)
- Spouse: Joseph Muscat (m. 2001)
- Children: 2

Michelle Muscat (née Tanti; born 16 May 1974) is the wife of the former Prime Minister of Malta, Joseph Muscat.

== Biography ==
Michelle Muscat met Joseph Muscat in 1995 at a "Labour Youth Forum activity". The couple married in 2001, and have twin children born in 2007. Her mother died in 2015; her father died in 2020.

Prior to her husband's term as Prime Minister, she worked as personal assistant to Alfred Sant and as a secretary to a Labour minister.

In 2018, she described herself as "passionate about social democratic values". Muscat was a campaigner for Robert Abela in 2019.

== Business and philanthropy ==
=== Panama Papers ===
In 2017, as part of the reaction to the Panama Papers, she was alleged to be involved in Panama-based letterbox companies in a network of political-business connections of her husband. After Muscat's election in 2013, employees of Brian Tonna created the letterbox company Egrant Inc. in Panama. In April 2017, journalist Daphne Caruana Galizia suggested that shares in Egrant Inc. were held by Mossack Fonseca nominees for Michelle Muscat. In December 2019, an inquiry was published, which investigated if the Panama company Egrant Inc. was owned by the prime minister, his wife or his family. The investigation found no evidence to support the claim made by Caruana Galizia.

=== Marigold Foundation ===
As of 2023, Muscat leads The Marigold Foundation – BOV in the Community, often shortened to the Marigold Foundation. The foundation, established in 2014 by the Bank of Valletta, is a distributor of donations to other non-profits. In 2019, Muscat took over the Foundation after several years of serving as its chairperson. As part of her work with the Foundation, she has held an annual long-distance charity swim.

Her time as leader has drawn criticism from some media outlets, who suggest she has misappropriated foundation funds.

=== Philanthropy ===
In the earl 2010s, Muscat was appointed a patron of Eurodris – the EU Alliance for Rare Diseases. She continued to be a patron until at least 2024. In 2017, she was appointed an International Global Citizen Ambassador for Children’s Health and Disease Prevention by Global Citizen.

Muscat has been an advocate for people with autism. She attended the annual World Forum on Autism from 2013 to 2016. As of 2016, Muscat was the Honorary President of the Association of Parents of Autistic Children. She also has attended conferences held by Autism Speaks.

She has also advocated for breast cancer awareness and education.

== Honours ==
- 2015: Order of Merit of the Federal Republic of Germany (Großes Bundesverdienstkreuz mit Stern und Schulterband)
- 2017:
  - National Volunteer of the year, Malta Council for Voluntary Work
  - Celebrating Women International award
- 2018: Order of Merit of the Italian Republic
- 2019: Bupa Malta Award, GlobalCapital Health Insurance
