= Charles Mangion =

Maltese politician

Member of Parliament
- In office 10 May 1987 – 9 March 2013

Leader of the Opposition
- In office 5 June 2008 – 1 October 2008
- President: Eddie Fenech Adami
- Prime Minister: Lawrence Gonzi
- Preceded by: Alfred Sant
- Succeeded by: Joseph Muscat

Deputy Leader of the Labour Party
- In office 23 May 2003 – 13 June 2008
- Preceded by: George Vella
- Succeeded by: Angelo Farrugia

Chairman of Air Malta plc
- In office 12 July 2017 – 31 December 2020
- Succeeded by: David Curmi

Personal details
- Born: 14 November 1952 (age 73) Pietà, Malta
- Party: Labour (PL)
- Spouse(s): Carmen; 3 children
- Profession: Civil law notary
- Website: Charles Mangion; Partit Laburista

Charles Mangion (born 14 November 1952) is a Maltese politician. He was a Member of Parliament in the House of Representatives of Malta from 1987 till 2017. He has served in the government as Minister of Justice and Local Government from 1996 to 1998. He was briefly Acting Leader of the Opposition in 2008.

== Personal life and family ==
Mangion was born in Pietà and lives in Luqa. He is married to Carmen, and they have three children.

== Education ==
He had his primary education in Hal Luqa and continued his secondary level education at the Lyceum in Hamrun. He graduated from the University of Malta with a B.A. (Hons.) degree in English Literature (1974), and in 1982 he achieved the Doctorate in Laws. He practised his profession as notary with his company, Mangion & Mangion Ltd.

== Political life ==
Mangion joined the Labour Party (PL) and in 1987 he was first elected to Parliament; he has continued to be elected in the following general elections. As a Member of Parliament, he represents the 6th District – Qormi, Siggiewi and Luqa.

From 1992 and 1994, he served as Shadow Minister of Home Affairs and between 1994 and 1996, he served as Shadow Minister of Industry and Local Government. Moreover, from 1992 and 1996 he served as a Deputy Speaker of the House of Representatives. In the Labour Party government led by Alfred Sant, he served as Minister of Justice and Local Government from 1996 to 1998. In May 2003, the Labour Party delegates elected him as a Deputy Leader of the Party for parliamentary affairs.

In 2003, he became the Shadow Minister for the Economy and Finance. Sant resigned as Leader of the Labour Party in 2008, following the Labour Party's narrow defeat in the March 2008 general election, and Mangion was Acting Leader for a brief period between March and June, when Joseph Muscat was elected Leader of the Labour Party. Between 5 June and 1 October 2008, Mangion assumed the role of Leader of the Opposition.

Party political offices
Preceded by George Vella	Deputy Leader of the Malta Labour Party; Parliamentary Affairs; 2003–2008	Succeeded by Angelo Farrugia
