= Marie Louise Kold =

- Born: Århus Denmark
- Known for: Art, Metallurgy

Marie Louise Kold is an artist who works with the patination and etching of metals. She is Danish, born in Århus, Denmark in 1974, but lives and works in Sweden.

Her works vary from single squares of bronze, copper or brass, patterned and coloured by immersion in acids, or by having their aging process speeded up through natural and chemical means, to complex portraits made up of thousands of small squares, given individual patination by various processes.

Her use of multi-layering, juxtaposition and interlacing of copper foil with metal plate, is also an intrinsic part of her artistic process. Recurrent themes in her art are etched quotations from writers such as the Danish Karen Blixen and Hans Christian Andersen, art-nouveau reminiscent angels, and large letters, framed by waves of colours brought out of the metal itself.

Major exhibitions include solos in Galleri Svenshög in Lund and Galleri New Form in Trelleborg, both in Sweden, as well as Illums Bolighus on Strøget, Copenhagen and Nordic Council of Ministers' Gallery, also in Copenhagen.
