= Joseph Muscat =

Prime Minister of Malta from 2013 to 2020

Joseph Muscat KUOM KCMG
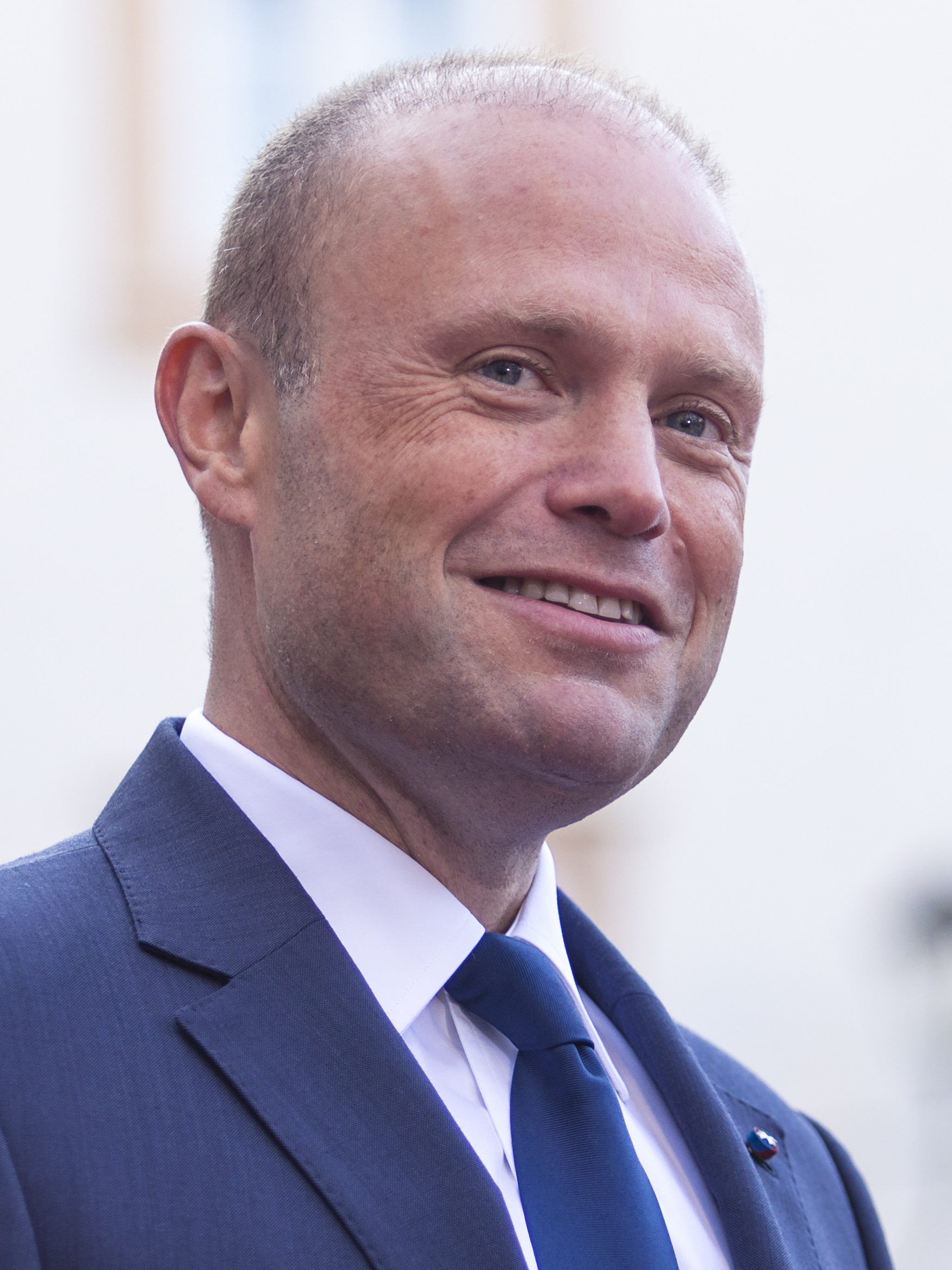
- Muscat in 2018

13th Prime Minister of Malta
- In office 11 March 2013 – 13 January 2020
- President: George Abela; Marie Louise Coleiro Preca; George Vella
- Deputy: Louis Grech; Chris Fearne
- Preceded by: Lawrence Gonzi
- Succeeded by: Robert Abela

Leader of the Opposition
- In office 1 October 2008 – 11 March 2013
- President: Eddie Fenech Adami; George Abela
- Prime Minister: Lawrence Gonzi
- Preceded by: Charles Mangion
- Succeeded by: Lawrence Gonzi

Leader of the Labour Party
- In office 6 June 2008 – 12 January 2020
- Preceded by: Alfred Sant
- Succeeded by: Robert Abela

Member of the European Parliament for Malta
- In office 12 June 2004 – 25 September 2008

Chairman of the Malta Premier League
- Incumbent
- Assumed office June 2022

Personal details
- Born: 22 January 1974 (age 52) Pietà, State of Malta
- Party: Labour
- Spouse: Michelle Tanti
- Children: 2
- Education: University of Malta; University of Bristol
- Website: Official website

Joseph Muscat KUOM KCMG (born 22 January 1974) is a Maltese politician who served as the 13th prime minister of Malta from 2013 to 2020 and leader of the Labour Party from 2008 to 2020.

Muscat was first elected Prime Minister in March 2013 with 54.83% and re-elected in June 2017 with 55.04%. Previously he was a member of the European Parliament (MEP) from 2004 to 2008. He was the leader of the opposition from October 2008 to March 2013. Muscat identifies as a progressive and liberal politician, with pro-business leanings, and has been associated with both economically liberal and socially liberal policies.

Muscat succeeded Alfred Sant as party leader in June 2008. He rebranded the Labour Party, which embraced an increasingly socially liberal and centrist position. His premiership was marked for pulling together a national consensus for economic growth, based on a restructured Maltese economy. His administration led to large-scale changes to welfare and civil liberties, including the legalisation of same-sex marriage in July 2017 and the legalisation of medical cannabis in March 2018.

Muscat presided over the rise of the Labour Party and its dominance in Maltese politics, and the relative decline of the Nationalist Party. He has been criticised by figures on both the left and right, and has been accused of political opportunism, broken promises on meritocracy and the environment, as well as corruption allegations.

On 1 December 2019, under pressure from the 2019 street protests calling for his resignation in relation to the assassination of journalist Daphne Caruana Galizia, Muscat announced his resignation, and stepped down on 13 January 2020.

In May, 2024, Joseph Muscat together with Konrad Mizzi, Keith Schembri, and others were criminally charged with, among other things, bribery, criminal association, and money laundering in relation to Steward Health Care, Vitals Global Healthcare and the related Hospital contract controversy.

Joseph Muscat is the only leader of a Maltese political party to have won all the elections he contested, ten in a row, both as Leader of the Opposition and Prime Minister, between 2009 and 2019, defeating three leaders of the Nationalist Party — Lawrence Gonzi, Simon Busuttil and Adrian Delia.

== Early life and career ==
=== Family ===
Muscat was born on 22 January 1974, in Pietà, Malta, to a Burmarrad family. He is an only child. With his father a fireworks importer, Muscat constantly referred to his family roots when describing his aversion to bureaucracy that hinders business. Muscat is married to Michelle Muscat (née Tanti) and they are the parents of twins.

=== Education ===
Muscat attended the Government Primary School in St. Paul's Bay, Stella Maris and St. Aloysius' College. Educated at St. Aloysius' in the 1980s, Muscat experienced the closure of Church schools by the Labour government of the day. This experience was reflected in the Labour party's 2013 manifesto with a pledge to continue financially supporting Church schools.

Muscat graduated with a Bachelor of Commerce in Management and Public Policy (University of Malta, 1995), a Bachelor of Arts with Honours in Public Policy (University of Malta, 1996), and a Master of Arts in European Studies (University of Malta, 1997). In 2007, he attained a Doctorate of Philosophy in Management Research from the University of Bristol with a thesis on Fordism, multinationals and SMEs in Malta, written during Muscat's term as MEP.

== Politics ==
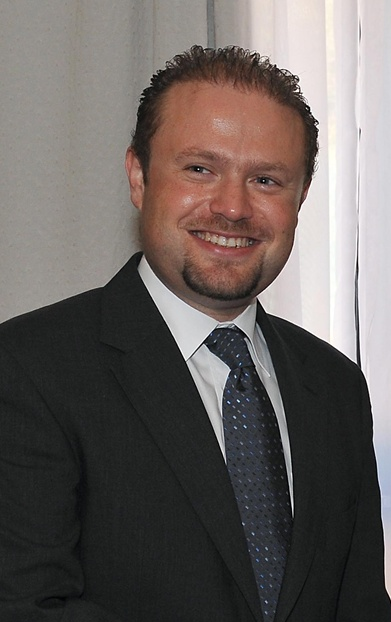
Muscat in 2010

Muscat was a member of the youth section of the Labour Party, the Labour Youth Forum (Forum Żgħażagħ Laburisti) where he served as financial secretary (1994–97) and acting chairperson (1997). During the Labour government of 1996–98 he was a member of the National Commission for Fiscal Morality (1997–98) and was considered a protégé of Mario Vella. He later served as education secretary in the central administration of the party (2001–2003) and chairman of its annual general conference (November 2003).

During his university years, from 1992 till 1997, Muscat worked as a journalist with the Labour Party's media arm, and founded the Party's now defunct news portal maltastar.com. He also worked as a journalist with the party's radio station, Super One Radio. He later took on a similar role at the Labour Party's Super One Television, chaired by Alfred Mifsud, becoming assistant head of news in 1996. Muscat wrote a regular column in L-Orizzont, a Maltese-language newspaper published by the General Workers' Union, as well as its sister Sunday weekly It-Torċa; he was a regular contributor to the independent newspaper The Times of Malta.

Upon graduation, in 1997 Muscat was employed as investment adviser by the Malta External Trade Corporation (METCO) and soon after joined as market intelligence manager the newly established Institute for the Promotion of Small Enterprise (IPSE) under the Malta Development Corporation (MDC) headed by Mario Vella; as he himself noted in his PhD thesis, in this post Muscat was effectively considered a political appointee and a person of trust of the ruling party. This situation made it harder for him to retain the confidence of the management after the return in power of the Nationalist Party in 1998 and the departure of Mario Vella from the MDC. He stayed in the position till 2001.

After staunchly campaigning against Malta's membership in the European Union at the 2003 referendum, the Labour Party lost its second general election in a row. In 2003, Muscat was nominated to a working group led by George Vella and Evarist Bartolo on the Labour Party's policies on the European Union. This working group produced the document Il-Partit Laburista u l-Unjoni Ewropea: Għall-Ġid tal-Maltin u l-Għawdxin ('Labour Party and the European Union: For the benefit of the Maltese and the Gozitans') which was adopted by the Labour Party Extraordinary General Conference in November of that year. The working group was instrumental in changing the Labour Party's eurosceptic policies, leading it to embrace a pro-EU stance. At this General Conference, Muscat was approved as a candidate for member of the European Parliament.

=== Member of the European Parliament (2004–2008) ===
Despite having previously expressed opposition to Malta's entry into the European Union, Muscat was elected to the European Parliament in the 2004 European Parliament election. He was the Labour Party (formerly the Malta Labour Party) candidate who received the most first-preference votes. Sitting as a Member of the European Parliament, with the Party of European Socialists, he held the post of Vice-President of the Parliament's Committee on Economic and Monetary Affairs and substitute member of the committee on the Internal Market and Consumer Protection. He was a member of a number of delegations for relations with Belarus and with the countries of south-east Europe. He was also a member of the EU-Armenia, EU-Azerbaijan and EU-Georgia Parliamentary Cooperation Committees. As an MEP he supported a reduction in the tax for satellite television, the right for customers to watch sport events for free, and a number of issues related to environmental protection in Malta. He formed part of a team responsible for a report on the roaming mobile phone bills and sale of banks.

In 2006, he was the recipient of the Outstanding Young Person of the Year. Muscat resigned his seat in the European Parliament in 2008 to take up a seat in the Maltese Parliament, and the role of Leader of the Opposition. Four months previously, he had been elected Leader of the Labour Party. Before his resignation, the European Parliament adopted his report proposing new regulations for the EU's financial services sector.

=== Leader of Labour Party ===
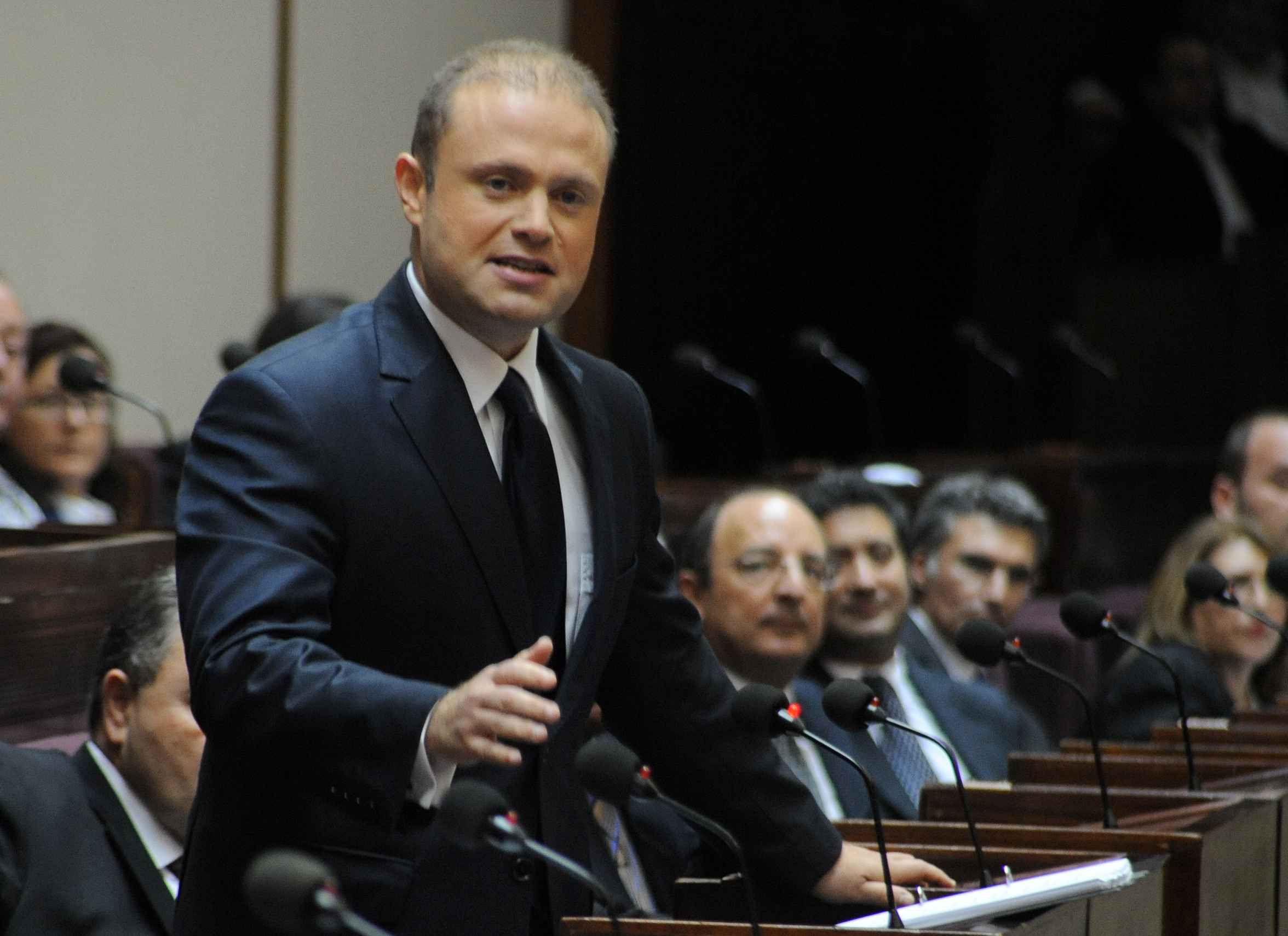
Muscat addressing the Maltese Parliament in 2011

On 24 March 2008 Muscat announced his candidacy for the post of party leader, to replace Alfred Sant, who had resigned after a third consecutive defeat for the Party in the March 2008 general election and a heavy defeat in the EU referendum in March 2003. Muscat's vision for the Labour party was that of a positive, organised and forward-looking party that went beyond the confines of the party itself, forming the basis for a wider movement embracing all progressives and moderates together.

Although at the time Muscat was not a member of the Maltese House of Representatives, he was elected as the new party leader on 6 June 2008. Muscat was just three votes short of winning the contest outright, obtaining 435 of the 874 valid votes cast, three fewer than the 438 needed (50 per cent plus one). He garnered 49.8 per cent of valid votes cast while the combined number of votes of the other contestants was 50.2 per cent. In order to take up the post of Leader of the Opposition, Muscat was co-opted in the Maltese Parliament on 1 October 2008 to fill the seat vacated by Joseph Cuschieri for the purpose. The latter eventually took up the sixth seat allocated to Malta in the European Parliament once the Treaty of Lisbon was brought into effect in 2011. On taking up the Leadership post, Muscat introduced a number of changes to the Party, notably the change of official name and party emblem.

In November 2008, the General Conference of the Labour Party approved a new statute. A National Congress was created that was empowered with choosing the party's leader in the future and approving the electoral programme. Other changes included measures aimed at drawing more women and youths to the party's structures, lowering the party's membership age threshold to 16 and dissolving the Brigata Laburista and the party's Vigilance and Disciplinary Board.

Labour started 2009 with an innovative initiative. On 14 March, thousands visited the National Labour Center in Hamrun and the Labour Party Center in Victoria, Gozo to sign up for a court case urging the Nationalist government to refund the VAT charged on their car registration tax.

In the 2009 Maltese European Parliament Elections, the first with Muscat as Party Leader, Labour candidates obtained 55% of first-preferences against the 40% obtained by candidates of the Nationalist Party. Labour surpassed the Nationalist Party by almost 36,000 votes and elected three of the five Maltese MEPs.

Local council elections were also held in 2009 with the Labour Party obtaining almost 55% of votes cast.

2009 ended with an unusual visit to the National Labour Center by former Prime Minister Dom Mintoff. It was Mintoff's first visit to PL HQ since its opening in 1995. Muscat and Mintoff had a private meeting. The former Labour leader was also shown around the building where he saw the preparations for a fundraising marathon which was going to be held on the occasion of the thirty-fifth anniversary of Republic day.

Towards the end of 2010, it was revealed that Prime Minister Lawrence Gonzi and his Cabinet members had been receiving an increase of almost €600 a week in their salary since May 2008, when at the same time the government had imposed the highest ever water and utility bills in the country's history.

2011 will be remembered for the referendum held on the introduction of divorce in Malta. In July 2010 Nationalist MP Jeffrey Pullicino Orlando presented a Private Member's Bill in Parliament to introduce divorce in Malta.

In February 2011 the Nationalist Party took an official stand against the introduction of divorce. One month later Joseph Muscat said that on a personal basis, he was going to campaigning for the introduction of divorce in Malta. The referendum was held on 28 May 2011. Just over 53% voted in favor of the introduction of divorce. The Labour Leader said that with this result, a new Malta was born and stressed that he was proud to have done what was right, instead of what was the least politically risky.

2012 started with the Nationalist government surviving a motion of no-confidence, with the casting vote of the Speaker, after Nationalist MP Franco Debono abstained. In March the Local Councils elections were won by Labour with 56% of the vote.

In May, Home Affairs Minister Carmelo Mifsud Bonnici resigned after losing a no confidence vote, with Nationalist MP Franco Debono voting with the Labour Opposition. In June, Prime Minister Lawrence Gonzi accepted the resignation of Malta's ambassador to the EU Richard Cachia Caruana, after Nationalist backbencher Jeffrey Pullicino Orlando voted in favour of an opposition motion of censure against Cachia Caruana. The motion was carried by 35 votes in favour and 33 against after another government MP, Jesmond Mugliett, abstained. In July Pullicino Orlando resigned from the Nationalist Party and became an independent MP. Joseph Muscat said Lawrence Gonzi had officially lost his majority.

Between 14 and 23 September, in preparation for the general election which was approaching, the Labour Party convened the first National Congress in its history. The Congress discussed Labour's proposals for education, health, energy, environment, economy and civil rights, among others.

On 10 December 2012 Nationalist MP Franco Debono voted against the 2013 Budget, effectively bringing down the Nationalist government. The day after Prime Minister Lawrence Gonzi held a 45-minute meeting with President George Abela and advised him to dissolve Parliament on 7 January 2013.

=== First term as prime minister ===
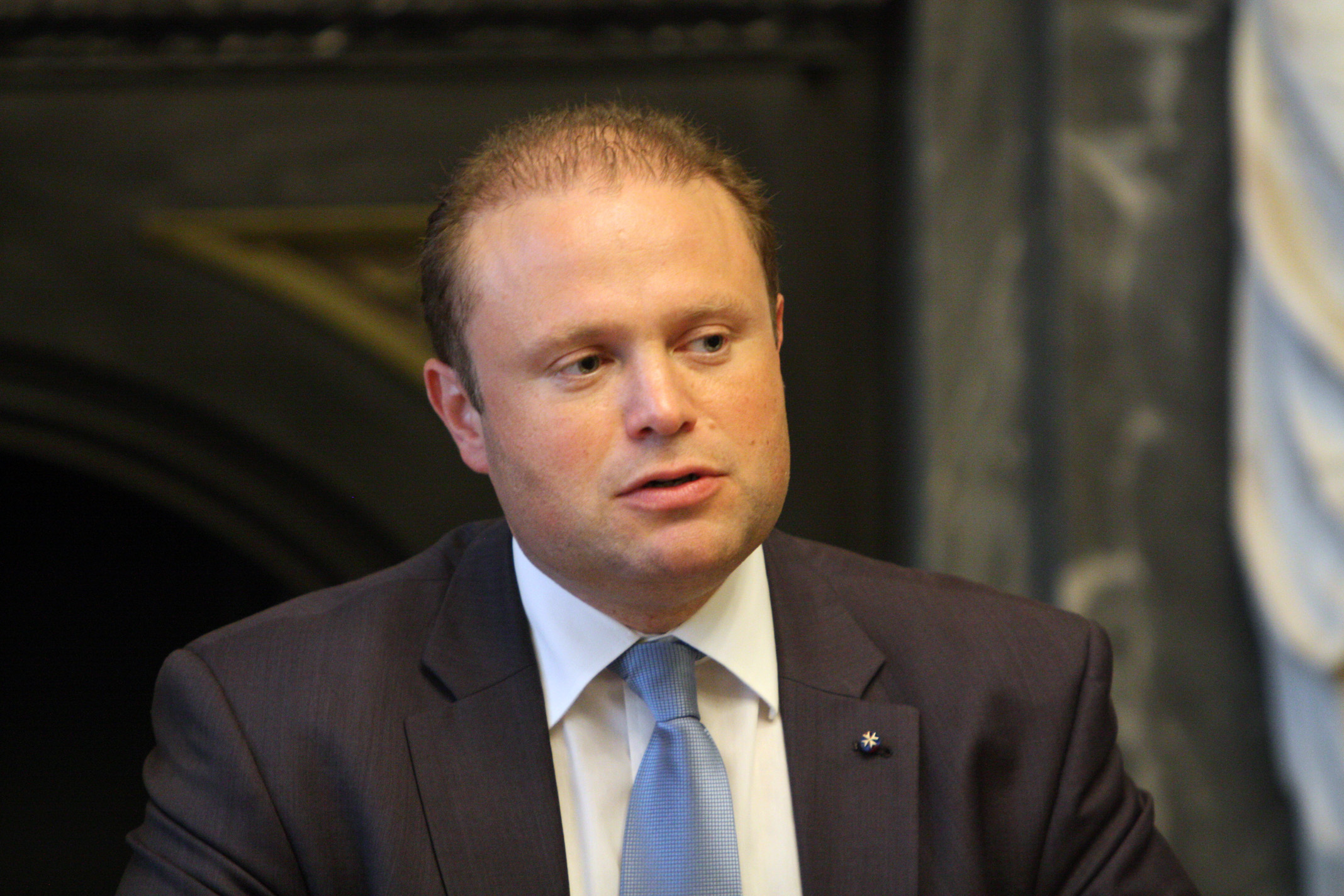
Muscat in 2014

Muscat contested Malta's general elections for the first time in March 2013.

Under the slogan "Malta belongs to all of us" (Malta taghna lkoll) the Labour Party defeated the Nationalist Party, winning by 11.5 percentage points, the largest majority obtained by any party since 1955. The Nationalists reached a 51-year low of 43%. Labour achieved 55% and a nine-seat majority in parliament, with Muscat becoming Prime Minister.

Muscat was elected on District 2 on the first count, with 13,968 votes and on District 4 again on the first count with 12,202 votes. On 11 March 2013 he was sworn in as Prime Minister of Malta. Following his election victory, Muscat was congratulated in a statement by the President of the European Commission, José Manuel Barroso, on behalf of the European Commission.

The new government found that the public finances were in such a bad shape that the European Commission by May 2013 opened an excessive deficit procedure for Malta. The deficit in the first three months of 2013 was €23.5 million more than in the same period of the preceding year while the debt at the end of March advanced by €333.7 million over the comparable period of 2012.

At the start of 2012 the Maltese economy had entered into recession. In March 2013 there were 7,350 unemployed persons. At the same time the country's main utility provider was on the verge of bankruptcy.

After his first months in office, Muscat claimed that he had presided over Malta's economic turnaround, and amongst others was instrumental for the reduction in energy tariffs, which was Labour's main commitment in its 2013 electoral manifesto, improvements in the health and energy sector, the elimination of out-of-stock medicines, the introduction of free-childcare centres, higher social benefits to parents and the youth employment guarantee and the introduction and strengthening of civil liberties.

In 2014, Muscat's government introduced the Malta Individual Investor Programme, for which it contracted Henley & Partners. Through such programmes, applicants acquire Maltese citizenship against investing a minimum of 1 million EUR in the country. The citizenship-by-investment programme generated around €600 million in revenues. Muscat repeatedly defended this programme, also presenting and promoting it personally at global Henley & Partners events in Dubai and elsewhere.

In 2015 the National Development and Social Fund (NDSF) was set up to receive revenue from the Maltese Individual Investor Programme and administer these funds in the public interest. From money deposited in the NDSF, investment projects of around €90 million were announced in the fields of health, social housing, community centres catering for specific needs of vulnerable groups and sports, among others while assisting various NGOs.

The Malta Individual Investor Programme also played a crucial role in helping to fund COVID-19 relief measures in 2020 and 2021, such as the wage supplements scheme.

Malta became an attractive location for foreign direct investment in financial services, online gaming, information technology, maritime and aviation hubs and high value-added manufacturing clusters. His administration led to large-scale changes to welfare with the introduction of social benefit tapering policies, and increases in minimum wage.

The directional change resulted in economic growth of over 6%, the lowest unemployment rate in the eurozone, the elimination of the public deficit and the first surplus in almost four decades and a decrease in the public debt burden. Poverty was reduced and pensions were increased for the first time in 25 years. Muscat insisted that these results were delivered by his government as a team. Among others, the Muscat administration's family friendly measures led to a 9% increase in female participation in the labour market, substantial savings to first-time home buyers, the value-added tax car registration refund, in-work benefits to low-income couples and single parents, stipends given to over 5,000 students who repeated a year and the introduction of civil unions.

In the area of good governance in 2013 the Whistleblower Act came into force, in 2014 prescription on acts of political corruption was removed, while in 2015 Parliament approved a new law regulating the funding of political parties.

The Cabinet not only continued to meet on a regular basis at the Office of the Prime Minister in the Auberge de Castille but started also to convene in various localities around Malta and Gozo to give all Local Councils the opportunity to voice their ideas, proposals and concerns. At the same time, a series of public consultation meetings with the theme A Government that Listens were launched.

In 2014, 16-year-olds were given the right to start voting in Local Council elections while four years later in 2018, Malta became the second country in the European Union to lower the voting age in all elections from 18 to 16 years.

After 2013, many measures taken by the Labor Government to put more money in people's pockets. Income tax was reduced every year. Thousands started to receive tax rebates, while the first ever tax-free budgets were also presented.

At the same time the Government's policy on fuel led to price stability for consumers, while thousands of members of corps established before 1979, former port workers and members of the police force received millions in compensation for grievances dating back more than 30 years.

Tourist arrivals reached record levels, with 2019 seeing 2.8 million tourists visiting Malta.

Positive economic trends were also reflected in Gozo, which experienced the largest economic growth in history. For two consecutive years, economic growth in Gozo was greater than in Malta. The number of Gozitans working in Gozo increased by more than 3,000 and the majority of new jobs in Gozo were in the private sector. At the same time Barts Medical School opened its Gozo campus, offering students from all over the world a new facility for the teaching and study of Queen Mary University of London's MBBS medical degree.

The increase in employment opportunities led to the creation of a new middle class. The number of homeowner families increased by 30,000 while household deposits with local banks increased by €5 billion.

In the environmental field, a new gas-fired power station was inaugurated in Delimara in 2017, while the old heavy fuel oil plant was shut down. In 2018, the process of dismantling the Marsa power station, which for years was a major source of air pollution in the south of Malta, was complete. Carbon dioxide (CO_{2}) emissions in the area were reduced by up to 761,000 tonnes a year. The chimney of the old Delimara power station, a symbol of the use of heavy fuel oil under successive Nationalist governments, was also demolished.

In 2018 amendments to the IVF law were introduced giving prospective parents a better chance of having a child. In 2019 an agreement was signed between the National and Social Development Fund and the Housing Authority, for a €50 million project for the construction of more than 500 social housing apartments in twelve localities.

New schools were built and maintenance work carried out on many others, free tablets were given to students, healthy breakfast clubs for children in primary schools before school time were launched and fees for the SEC and MATSEC exams were removed.

Waiting time for operations decreased, medicines provided for free by hospitals and pharmacies increased considerably, new wards were built at Mater Dei Hospital, massive investment in new medical equipment was done, new community health centers and facilities were inaugurated, a €40 million project for a new "health hub" in Paola, which would act as a regional medical centre, was initiated and government began covering the travel expenses for both parents, instead of one, when children are sent abroad for treatment.

Muscat admitted that his first administration had its challenges, namely the environment and good governance.

The end of 2015 saw two high-level international meetings held in Malta.

The Valletta Summit began in Malta on 11 November and brought together the Heads of Governments of the European Union and of a substantial number of African countries who discussed how to strengthen cooperation in the field of migration. Then between the 27th and 29 November, the fifty-three leaders of the Commonwealth countries met in Malta, with the meeting being opened by Queen Elizabeth. Over 4,000 delegates attended each summit, excluding 2,000 journalists who covered the events.

Following this meeting, Malta was the chair in office of the Commonwealth for two and a half years. The valuable work done by the Maltese government was recognized by the British Prime Minister Theresa May at the Commonwealth leaders meeting held in London in 2018.

On 7 April 2014, Muscat suffered from temporary blindness caused by ultraviolet radiation, probably related to burns to his cornea. Like 60 other people with similar symptoms, he had participated at a political rally the day before.

==== Panama Papers ====
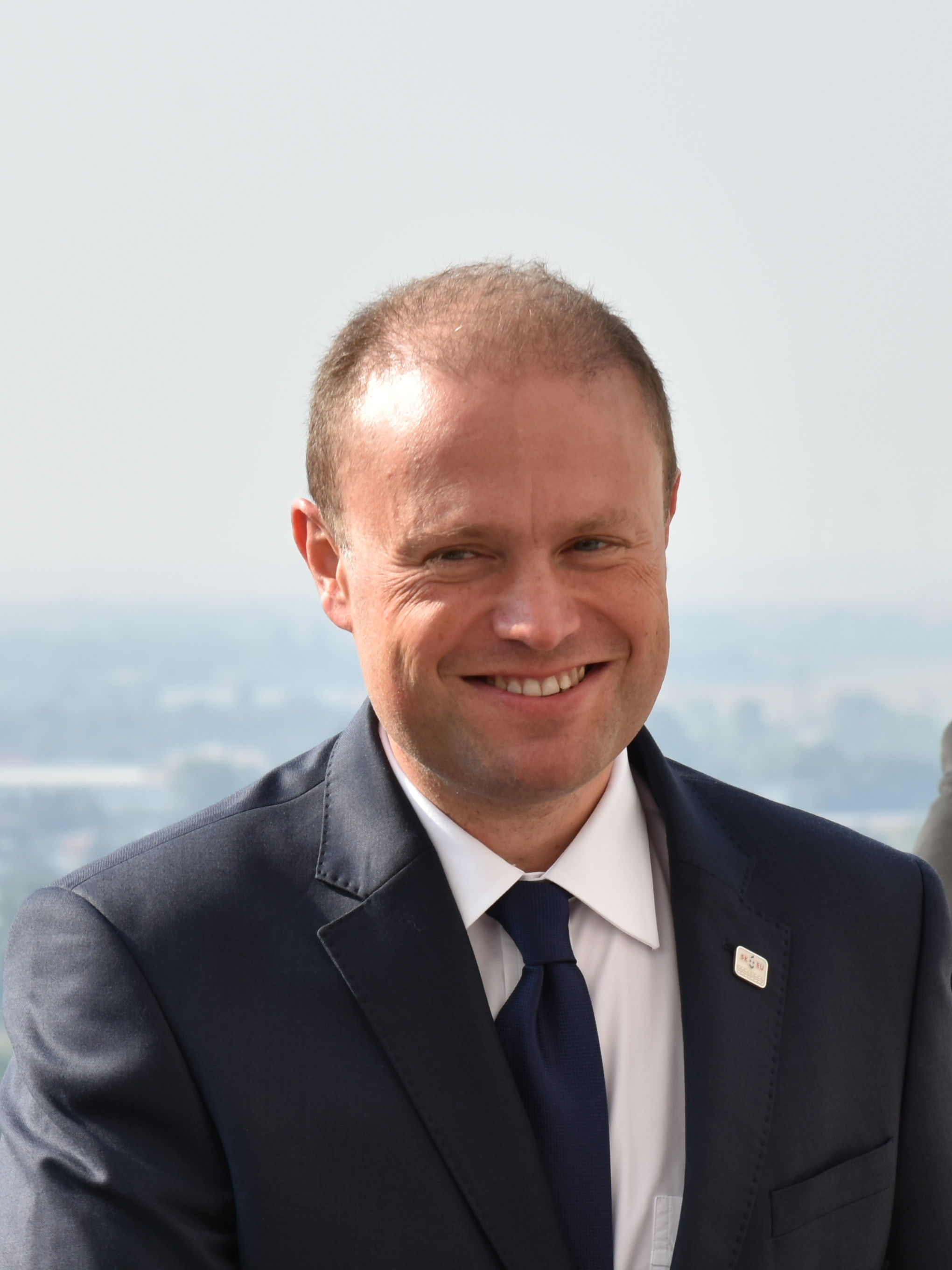
Muscat in 2016

In 2016, two of Muscat's close collaborators were implicated in the Panama Papers, holding two companies in that jurisdiction. These were Konrad Mizzi, a minister, and Keith Schembri, the Prime Minister's chief of staff.

In 2017 journalist and blogger Daphne Caruana Galizia alleged that Muscat's wife held a third company in Panama named Egrant. Opposition Leader Simon Busuttil made his own allegations of significant money transfers into Egrant. Muscat and his wife Michelle denied the claims and Muscat requested an independent magisterial inquiry, calling the allegations the 'biggest political lie in Malta's political history'. Muscat insisted that truth was on his side, and that he wanted to protect Malta from uncertainty, and called a general election. Corruption became the battlecry for the Nationalist Party in the general election campaign. Holding a snap election in the last months of Malta's rotating presidency of the EU Council was looked at with scepticism in Brussels.

The magisterial inquiry led by Magistrate Aaron Bugeja interviewed 477 witnesses. International forensic experts and firms sifted through thousands of documents and digital records from multiple sources. The inquiry required the collaboration of five nations (Panama, Belgium, the UAE, Germany and the USA) and spanned over 15 months. The results of the inquiry were made public on 22 July 2018 (though the final report of the inquiry was never released for public scrutiny). The inquiry found falsified signatures, differing testimonies and no proof that the Prime Minister, his wife, or their family had a connection with the company. The inquiry found no evidence linking the Prime Minister and his wife to the Panama company. Muscat defined the Egrant allegations as an "undisputed and elaborate" attempt at a political frame up.

In November 2021 in an affidavit presented in court in libel proceedings initiated by Muscat, Dr Peter Caruana Galizia, husband of Daphne Caruana Galizia, stated that his late wife had not told him who were those whom he described as "anonymous sources" within Pilatus Bank, who submitted documents, on the basis of which, the Egrant allegation was constructed. The independent Magisterial inquiry concluded that these documents were false. Dr. Caruana Galizia confirmed in writing that his late wife saw these false documents and came to the conclusion that "she had proof that her suspicion about Egrant was well-founded".

And while for the last years, Maria Efimova, a Russian citizen, had presented herself as the source of the Egrant allegation, in the affidavit Dr. Caruana Galizia said that Efimova may and may not be one of the sources his late wife had. Efimova has now been on the run from Malta for six years and is facing an international arrest warrant on a court order. Efimova's version of events in her testimony in the Egrant inquiry contrasted with that of Daphne Caruana Galizia, and even the inquiring Magistrate commented about this and ordered criminal action against Efimova. In November 2020, Maria Efimova and former police officer Jonathan Ferris, were charged with perjury following the conclusions of the Egrant Inquiry. Efimova could not be traced to be notified about the case.

In his November 2021 affidavit Dr Peter Caruana Galizia also made reference to an article published in 2017 by his late wife where it was alleged that in March of the previous year a company belonging to the daughter of the President of Azerbaijan Leyla Aliyeva, made a single payment transaction of US$1.017 million to Egrant. Four years later, Dr Caruana Galizia stated that there is no evidence to substantiate this allegation.

==== General election 2017 ====
The Labour Party ran a campaign focused on the administration's successes and achievements over the previous four years. Muscat stressed the record economic growth and employment levels, and the turnaround in the country's finances from deficit to surplus. The Labour campaign highlighted the fulfilled pledges, dealing with tax reductions, social benefits and childcare, as well as higher student stipends. Labour's fight on poverty and increase in pensions also featured prominently. Muscat's pledges for the next five years were aimed at the better distribution of the country's wealth, giving workers back public holidays that fall during a weekend, an ambitious seven-year plan to resurface all of Malta's roads and a tax bonus for every worker earning up to €60,000.

Under the slogan The best time for our country (L-aqwa zmien ghal pajjizna), the Labour Party, with Muscat at its helm, won the 2017 General Election. The Labour Party won a second term in government for the first time since 1976, receiving 55%.

Dr Muscat received 14,674 first count votes on the 2nd district and 12,886 first count votes on the 5th District.

=== Second term as prime minister ===
Muscat's first commitment upon being elected was the introduction of a gay marriage law before Parliament's summer recess. Same-sex marriage was legalised by mid-July 2017, after a vote which tested the Nationalist Party's conservative MPs.

Presidency of the Council of the European Union

Between January and June 2017, Malta held the six-month rotating Presidency of the Council of the European Union.

On 3 February 2017, Joseph Muscat hosted in Valletta an informal summit for all 28 EU heads of State or government which discussed irregular migration from Libya and the preparations for the 60th anniversary of the Rome Treaties. The Maltese presidency concluded at least 24 main legislative dossiers with the European Parliament. Several were of clear benefit to the citizen, from high-speed internet to energy-efficiency labelling of consumer products. The Maltese presidency also gained a reputation for being a very good driver of consensus and compromise in the Council of Ministers and a balanced negotiator with the Parliament.

In July, Muscat closed Malta's presidency of the EU Council, describing the country's achievements and the sense of positivity the EU Presidency brought to Malta. The Brussels-based Politico online news magazine commended Malta's Presidency. "The EU's smallest country has won praise for its diplomatic prowess in brokering agreement on a range of issues," Politico said. Politico also heaped praise on Malta's negotiating skills in pushing through legislation in dozens of policy areas and awarded the country full marks for its achievements and the handling of the EU's Brexit response.

Both the President of the European Commission Jean-Claude Juncker and the President of the European Council Donald Tusk recognized Malta's achievements, with Juncker calling Malta's Presidency as impressive and Tusk describing it as one of the best experiences in his professional life.

Upgrading Malta's road network

A very ambitious programme to develop and upgrade Malta's road network was launched, to make sure it will meet the new realities of the island's booming economy. A new agency was set up and a budget of €700 million was allocated. A series of road projects, which Malta had never seen before, took off. Amongst others, work begun on the flyovers project in Marsa, the largest road project ever undertaken. Free public transport schemes for young people and the elderly were also launched.

Electoral Results 2014–2019

In May 2014 the Labor Party became the first party in Government in Malta to win the European Parliament election with 53% of all first count votes. In April 2015 the Labor Party also won the Local Council elections with just over 53% of all votes cast. On 25 May 2019, the Labour Party won the European Parliament election once again, by a margin of almost 43,000 votes over the Nationalist Party, receiving 54% of the total votes. For the first time the Labour Party elected four of the six Maltese MEPs. Local Council elections were held on the same day. The Labor Party obtained a landslide victory receiving 58% of the total votes, and surpassing the Nationalist Party with a record 47,100 votes.

==== 2019 political crisis and resignation ====
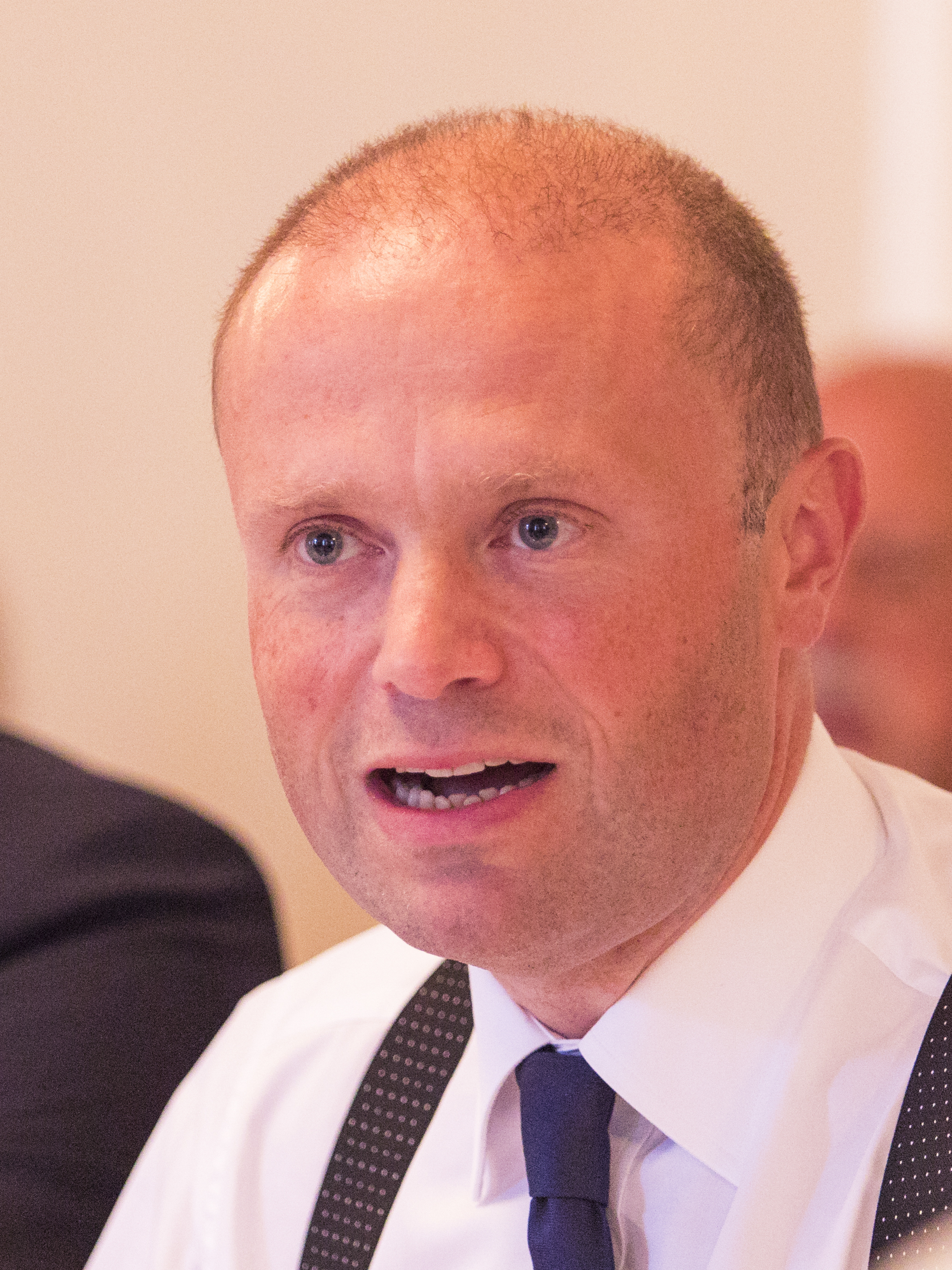
Muscat in January 2020

In October 2017, investigative journalist Daphne Caruana Galizia died in a car bomb attack. Muscat promised to "leave no stone unturned" in the subsequent investigation. The opposition blamed Muscat for what they deemed a "political murder" and for the collapse of the rule of law in the country.

The United States Federal Bureau of Investigation and Europol were immediately asked to help the Maltese police in their investigations.

On 5 December 2017, only fifty days after the car bomb, three men - brothers, George and Alfred Degiorgio, and Vincent Muscat - were charged with the murder of Caruana Galizia.

In February 2021 Vincent Muscat was sentenced to 15 years in prison after he pleaded guilty.

In October 2022 the Degiorgio brothers were jailed for 40 years each.

In the following two years, Muscat spoke very sparingly of the Caruana Galizia case and of the periodic protests that took place in Valletta. Government employees were tasked with clearing a makeshift memorial to Caruana Galizia at the Great Siege Monument in Valletta on a regular basis.

Muscat faced accusations of failing to take action against two close aides: Keith Schembri, his chief of staff, and Konrad Mizzi, tourism and formerly energy minister, whose business and underworld links had been subject to judiciary and administrative investigations.

Around the 2019 European elections, Muscat was touted for an EU job, possibly as successor to Donald Tusk as head of the European Council. His bid failed. While he had been a frontrunner to succeed Tusk back in 2017, in 2019 his image was tainted by the Caruana Galizia murder and the multiple reports of European institutions warning about the erosion of the rule of law in Malta.

In late November 2019, Muscat's premiership was rocked by the arrest of prominent businessman Yorgen Fenech, also in connection with the Caruana Galizia's bomb attack, and the implication of Muscat's chief of staff Schembri. On 25 November 2019, after protestors had called for him to resign, Muscat autonomously decided to grant presidential pardon to Melvin Theuma, considered the middleman between the executors of Caruana Galizia's murder, and the masterminds, on condition that he could link the person suspected of commissioning the murder of Caruana Galizia to those who carried out the killing, as well as those who helped provide the explosive device used.

On 29 November, after a six-hours cabinet meeting, Muscat denied the same presidential pardon to Yorgen Fenech. The same day Muscat informed the President of Malta George Vella that he would soon be resigning his duties as prime minister.

On 1 December in a television address he announced that he would step down from his position as prime minister, after a PL leadership contest. In his address, Muscat said that he gave everything in return for the trust the Maltese gave him but added that he need to shoulder everyone's responsibilities, even where he was not involved. He reminded that he had promised justice in the case of Caruana Galizia's murder. "I kept my word - we have three people charged with her murder and we also have the alleged mastermind charged" said Dr Muscat.

Both Malta's main newspapers, The Times of Malta and Malta Today, as well as international media such as The Guardian called on Muscat to make his resignation immediate. The European Parliament also called for Muscat to immediately quit over the Caruana Galizia murder. National protests were held calling for his immediate resignation, rather than stepping down in January 2020. The Organised Crime and Corruption Reporting Project named Muscat "Man of the Year in Organized Crime and Corruption" for 2019 for the increases in criminality and lack of prosecutions during his term.

In December 2019 Muscat had a strictly private meeting with Pope Francis. While in Rome, he did not meet with Italian Prime Minister Giuseppe Conte.

Muscat gave his final speech as Prime Minister on 10 January 2020. Following Robert Abela's victory over Chris Fearne in the Labour Party internal competition, Muscat resigned as prime minister.

=== Following activities ===
In late 2019/early 2020, Muscat went on a number of overseas trips, including a New Year's Day trip to London and a 70-hour trip to Dubai with his family on 27–30 December, out of which 15 hours were spent in transit, to attend the Ritossa Family office Investment Summit. The tickets were purchased in Jordan. Despite Muscat's initial statement that he had paid for the trip out of his own pocket, Malta's Standards Commissioner George Hyzler confirmed that the first-class flights (for a total of €21,000) were paid by a third party, which he decided not to name, upon Muscat's request, as the visit was of a private nature.

In September 2020, financial crime blogger Kenneth Rijock, a disbarred attorney who, in 1990, pleaded guilty to one count of conspiracy of fraud and one count of racketeering at a federal court in Florida, for which he received a 24-month prison sentence, alleged that Muscat aimed to move to Dubai and take up a post as CEO of a Maltese-owned Dubai catering company which had just been awarded a lucrative public tender in Malta. Rijock claimed Muscat could be among the targets of an FBI special money laundering investigation focusing on Malta, and as there is no extradition treaty between the United Arab Emirates and the United States. Muscat denied these plans and did to move to Dubai.

In August 2020, Muscat was interrogated by police on the case of the murder of Caruana Galizia, following remarks by suspect Yorgen Fenech. Muscat was not under investigation.

In October 2020, Muscat resigned as Member of the Maltese Parliament with a 90-second speech.

In December 2020, Muscat testified in the public inquiry into Caruana Galizia's murder; he confirmed close contacts and "friendship" with Yorgen Fenech, while denying having any indication on the murder plot.

In his testimony he said that there can never be any justification for the assassination of Caruana Galizia. He explained that the moment this assassination took place, he knew that his political life would be marked by it as much as all the things he tried doing for Malta. "What happened on 16 October 2017 made me resolute that before signing off, I wanted to see a breakthrough in this case. I did not want to be like my predecessors who talked a lot but did not do anything about major murders which shook the country", declared Joseph Muscat.

In July 2021 the Inquiry's report was published. While concluding that the State was responsible for Caruana Galizia's murder, the Inquiry at the same time found that the State had no prior knowledge of, or was involved in the assassination. The report also unequivocally stated that Muscat was in no way implicated in the murder. In his reaction whilst accepting the conclusions of the Inquiry, Muscat disagreed that under his Premiership a state of impunity was created, and stated that the Inquiry failed to adequately acknowledge that the alleged hitmen were apprehended in less than two months and the alleged mastermind a few months later, following investigations involving amongst others Europol and FBI. This fact disproves any impression of impunity that the alleged perpetrators may have had. Muscat insisted that there was impunity in cases before his term in office, where high profile crimes were committed but nobody was ever prosecuted.

In November 2023 the Permanent Commission Against Corruption chaired by judge emeritus Lawrence Quintano, together with judge emeritus Philip Magri and former police commissioner John Rizzo, absolved Dr Muscat of the accusation of trading in influence over gifts made to him by Yorgen Fenech, after a complaint by Prof Arnold Cassola. The Commission concluded that from what it had heard, it did not result that the gifts were intended for some economic advantage, since policy changes for high-rise building at Mrieħel, resulted in a project of Fenech's Tumas Group losing €12 million in value because of a reduction in gross developable area.

== Legal battles ==
On 13 May 2019 Repubblika called for a magisterial inquiry into the privatization of three state hospitals, indicating four main suspects. Muscat was not one of these suspects. This application was followed up by a second one, dated 4 October 2019. The main suspects remained the same. Two and a half years later, on 7 November 2021, Times of Malta published an article alleging irregularities in advisory works carried out by Muscat, who by then was no longer Prime Minister for almost two years. It was only after this article that Repubblika requested an investigation involving Muscat in relation to the hospitals’ privatization deal.

As confirmed under oath by Dr Robert Aquilina, after legal advice, Repubblika did not write to Magistrate Gabriella Vella who was leading the Magisterial inquiry into the hospitals’ privatization deal. Had it done so, Vella would have had to send these new allegations to a different Magistrate to open a new inquiry and Muscat would have been given an opportunity to answer all charges against him. Instead, Repubblika wrote to Police Commissioner Anglu Gafa. Under normal circumstances the Police Commissioner would have gone to the Duty Magistrate, once again a Magistrate different from Vella, and Muscat would have had his rights protected.

But Police Commissioner Gafa had testified in court that Magistrate Vella had instructed him to inform her of everything he came across regarding the hospitals’ privatization deal. Subsequently Vella instructed the Police Commissioner to withhold action against Muscat, thereby preventing Muscat from exercising his right to a response. On 16 November 2021 Muscat himself asked Vella for a meeting where he could answer all questions about the Times of Malta article, showing that it was not true at all that these advisory work contained anything irregular, presenting documents related to the work he had done and pointing out persons who could corroborate what he was saying.

Instead of sending for Muscat, the Magistrate ordered searches to be carried out in his residence and office. Magistrate Vella responded to Muscat’s request of 16 November 2021, a year and a half later on 23 May 2023, five days after Muscat had asked for the same Magistrate to recuse herself. Eventually when on 28 May 2024, one week before the 2024 MEP elections, arraignments were made on the basis of Vella’s inquiry, Muscat found himself as the main actor accused of corruption, money laundering, fraud and that he is the head of a criminal organization, when his name was not included in the original request for the inquiry.

=== Leaks ===
A series of leaks characterized the Magisterial inquiry proceedings.

The Court itself remarked how Repubblika was responding to the applications of the main suspects against whom the inquiry was opened, before the same persons would be notified. It was also revealed in Court that people who were commenting on social media about what was happening in the inquiry, were contacting people involved in the same inquiry. The day before the search at Muscat’s residence and office, Repubblika’s lawyer, Jason Azzopardi, published a post on Facebook where he seemed to indicate what was going to take place. When Muscat’s residence was searched, Dr Robert Aquilina who at that time was the President of Repubblika, knew about it beforehand, and was outside watching what was going on. The end of the inquiry was announced through a leak and the inquiry report was also leaked.

At the same time the father of Magistrate Vella, Aldo Vella, in 2019 shared a Facebook post with a poster uploaded by Nationalist Party MP Karol Aquilina urging people to attend a ‘Protest Against Corruption’ that was to be held on 16 November in Valletta. On the shared poster there was Muscat’s face. On the other hand, the Magistrate’s brother, Massimo Vella, in 2023 wrote a message on Facebook where he used the word confusion in relation to the hospitals’ privatization deal.

In Court Muscat maintained that all this shows a certain prejudice from close relatives of the Vella and "in this context it is natural that people will start to find difficulty perceiving objective impartiality in the Magistrate’s work". He also reminded that the Constitutional Court had accepted a request that had been made for the removal of Deputy Commissioner Silvio Valletta from the investigation into the murder of Caruana Galizia because his wife was a Minister in the government led by him. In October 2018 the Constitutional Court decided that Valletta’s presence in the investigations could lead to "serious doubts in the mind of the citizen" as to whether the investigation was carried out impartially.

== Wealth ==
In 2014, Muscat declared an unchanging bank balance of €75,000. In 2015, he stopped declaring his actual salary, simply stating "salary prime minister" on his yearly asset declaration, which showed a lower income than a number of cabinet ministers. In 2018, according to his spokesperson, his salary amounted to €55,978 plus €6,769 in allowances.

== Honours ==
=== National honours ===
- Malta: Companion of Honour of the National Order of Merit (2013) by right as a Prime Minister of Malta

=== Foreign honours ===
- United Kingdom: Honorary Knight Commander of the Order of St Michael and St George (2015)
- Greece: Grand Cross of the Order of Honour
- Sovereign Military Order of Malta: Grand Cross – Special Class – of the Order pro Merito Melitensi
- Germany: Great Cross of Merit – Grand Cross
- Ukraine: Order of the Prince Yaroslav the Wise – II class
- Italy: Knight Grand Cross of the Order of Merit of the Italian Republic (10 January 2018)

Party political offices
Preceded by Alfred Sant	Leader of the Labour Party; 2008–2020	Succeeded by Robert Abela
Political offices
Preceded by Alfred Sant	Leader of the Opposition; 2008–2013	Succeeded by Lawrence Gonzi
Preceded by Lawrence Gonzi	Prime Minister of Malta; 2013–2020	Succeeded by Robert Abela
Diplomatic posts
Preceded by Maithripala Sirisena	Chairperson of the Commonwealth of Nations; 2015–2018	Succeeded by Theresa May
