= Statue of Queen Victoria, Valletta =

Statue in Valletta, Malta

Statue of Queen Victoria
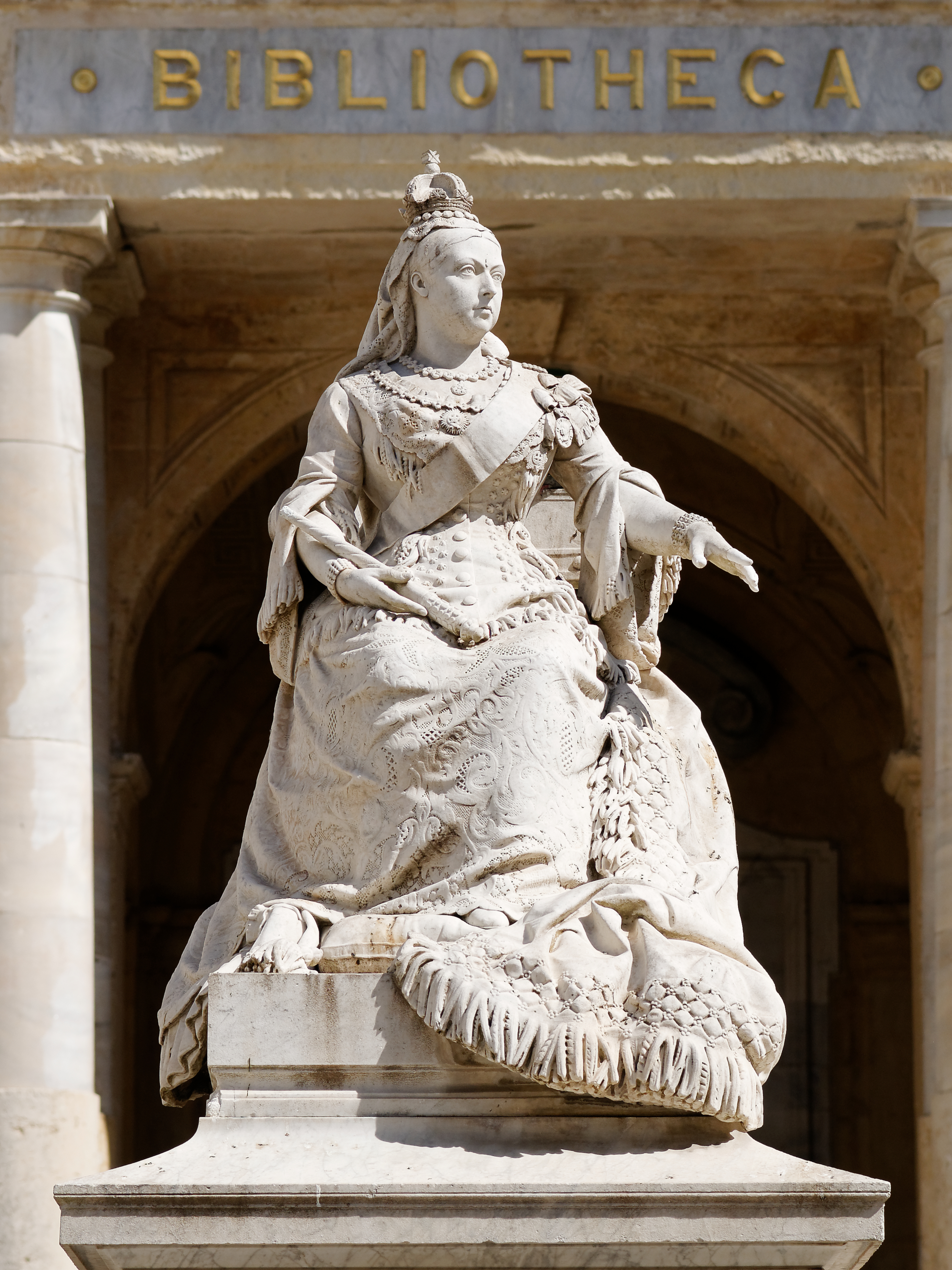
- The statue in 2012
- Artist: Giuseppe Valenti
- Completion date: 5 August 1891
- Medium: Marble
- Subject: Queen Victoria
- Location: Valletta, Malta; 35°53′54.3″N 14°30′48.0″E

A statue of Queen Victoria stands in front of the National Library of Malta in Republic Square, Valletta, Malta. Sculpted out of marble by the Sicilian artist Giuseppe Valenti, the statue depicts the Queen sitting down and wearing a shawl of Maltese lace. It was installed in the square on 5 August 1891, replacing a bronze statue of António Manoel de Vilhena.

== History ==
The site of the statue was an empty space until the mid-19th century, when Governor John Le Marchant installed a bronze statue of António Manoel de Vilhena and established a garden with orange trees in the square. The statue had been cast in 1736 and it had previously been located at Fort Manoel. After the statue of Queen Victoria was installed instead of that of Vilhena, the latter was moved to Floriana and the orange trees were removed.

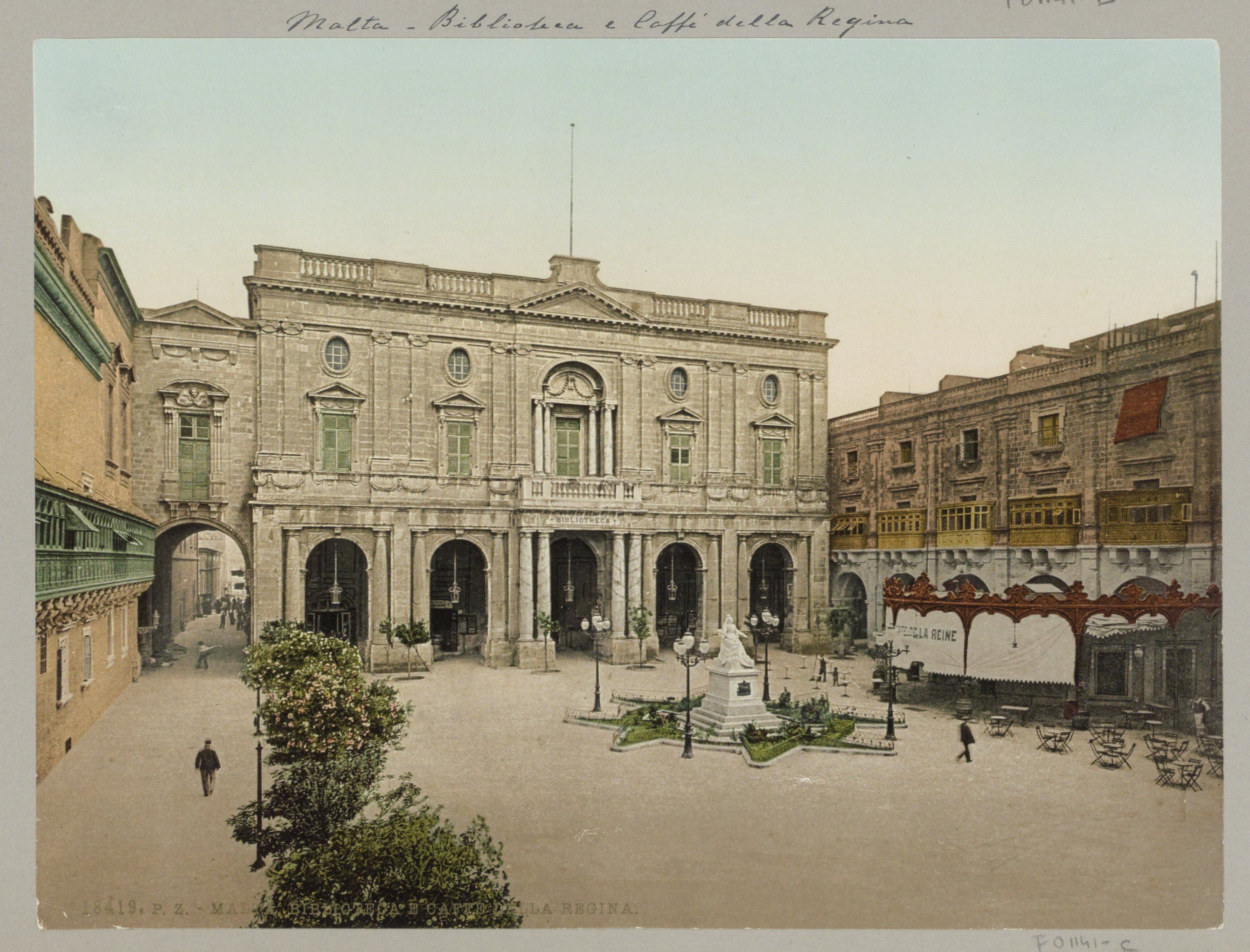
The square in the early 1900s, with the statue visible at its centre

The statue was commissioned by public subscription to commemorate the 1887 Golden Jubilee of Queen Victoria. It was sculpted in Palermo by the Sicilian artist Giuseppe Valenti, who had previously sculpted a statue of Saint Publius for the Mdina Cathedral in 1885, and it was inaugurated on 5 August 1891.

In 1901, ten years after its inauguration, the statue became the focal point for the public mourning commemorations following the Queen's death.

The monument probably suffered some damage from shrapnel and vibrations due to bombs exploding nearby during World War II. In the 1960s, the statue was reportedly targeted by socialists who daubed it in red paint. Despite this, there were very few calls for its removal even after Malta became an independent state in 1964 and later a republic in 1974. The square which contains the statue is now officially known as Misraħ ir-Repubblika (Republic Square), but it is still commonly referred to as Pjazza Reġina (Queen's Square) after the statue.

The statue deteriorated over the years due to weather conditions and feral pigeons which are common in the area. By the early 21st century, parts of the pedestal were chipped, while the fingers of the left hand and parts of the coronet and sceptre were missing. The inscriptions on the pedestal had also eroded. The monument was cleaned and restored in 2011, with conservation work being carried out by Heritage ResCo. The restoration was sponsored by M. Demajo Group and Din l-Art Ħelwa, while the Ministry of Resources and Rural Affairs provided some assistance.

In June 2020, there were some calls for the statue's removal in the wake of the removal of many statues in the United States and elsewhere during the George Floyd protests. Former Valletta 2018 artistic director Mario Azzopardi called the statue a "colonial obscenity" and called for its removal, while the executive chairman of the Malta Book Council Mark Camilleri called for its relocation and replacement with a monument to a prominent Maltese intellectual. There were also those who came out against the statue's removal, including Fondazzjoni Wirt Artna founder Mario Farrugia and culture minister José Herrera. The latter stated that removal of monuments of British colonial rule in Malta would be "ridiculous" and that it would not change the fact that the islands were under foreign rule for much of their history.

== Description ==
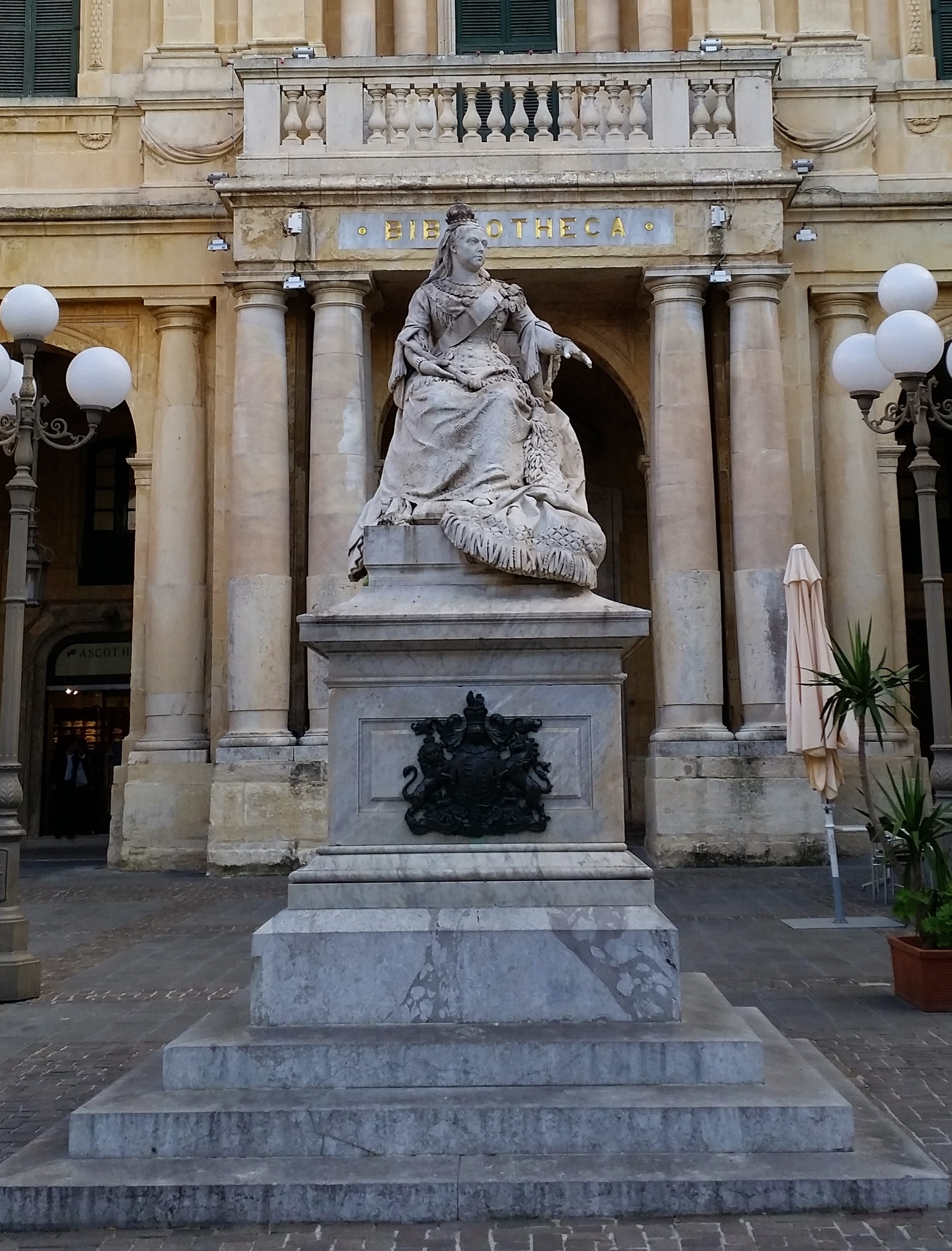
The statue and its pedestal in 2014

The statue depicts Queen Victoria wearing a shawl of Maltese lace, in reference to the fact that she had ordered "eight dozen pairs long and eight dozen pairs short mitts, besides a scarf" of Malta lace. According to Jesmond Grech, she did so "in an attempt to revive this ancient craft."

It is sculpted out of white marble. The pedestal and the steps leading to it are made out of grey stone. This also includes two coats of arms cast in bronze: the British coat of arms at the front and that of Malta at the back.

Public mourning of the death of Queen Victoria by her statue in then- Piazza Tesoreria, August 1901:

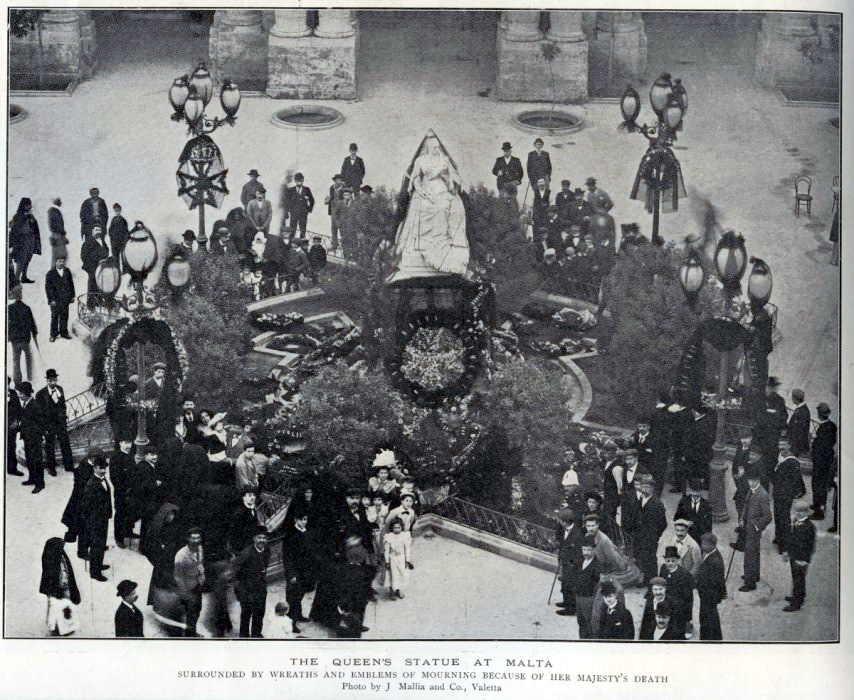
J.Mallia

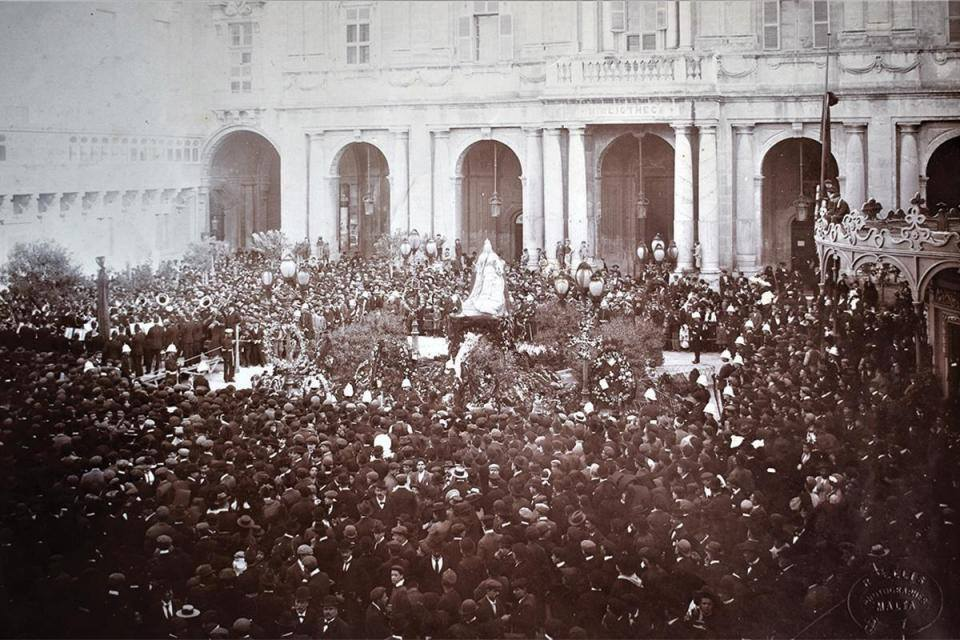
Richard Ellis

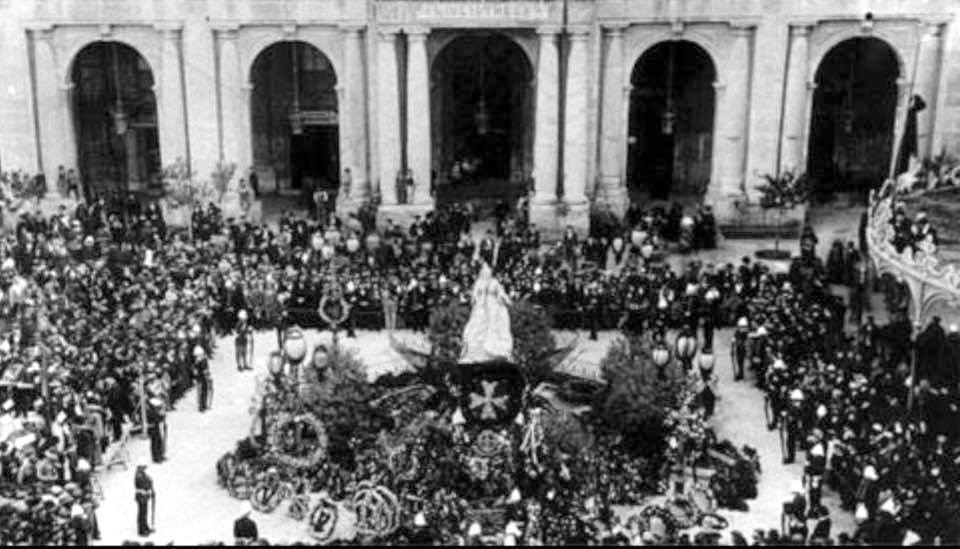
