= Jesmond (disambiguation) =

Jesmond is a suburb of Newcastle upon Tyne, Tyne and Wear, England.

Jesmond may also refer to:

Places:

- Jesmond, British Columbia, Canada
- Jesmond, New South Wales, Australia

People with the given name:

- Jesmond Delia (born 1967), Maltese footballer
- Jesmond Giordemaina (born 1966), Maltese wrestler
- Jesmond Grech (born 1963), Maltese author
- Jesmond Zerafa (born 1965), Maltese footballer
