= Genoese lace =

Type of bobbin lace from Genoa, Italy

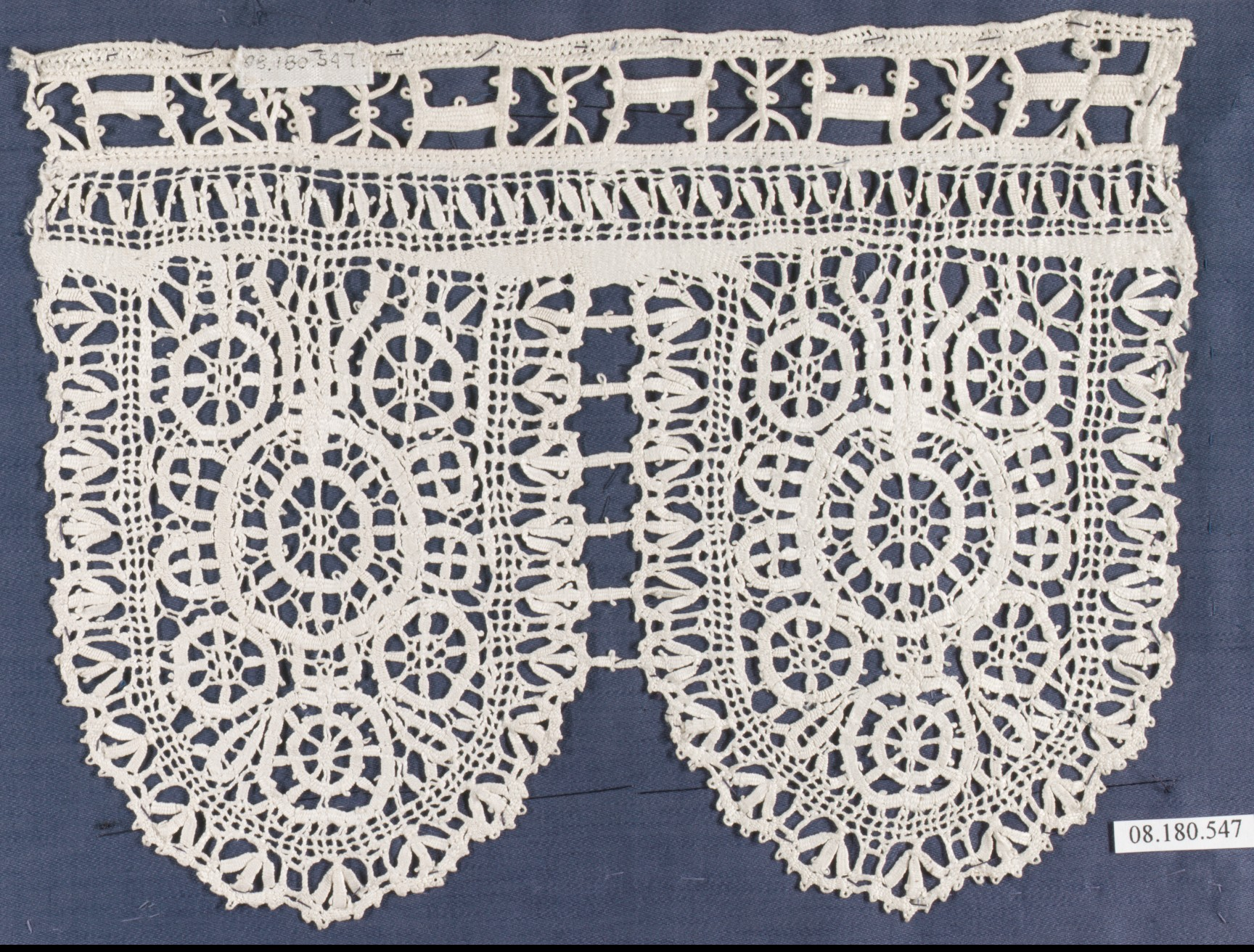
Fragment, Italian, Genoa (MET, 08.180.547)

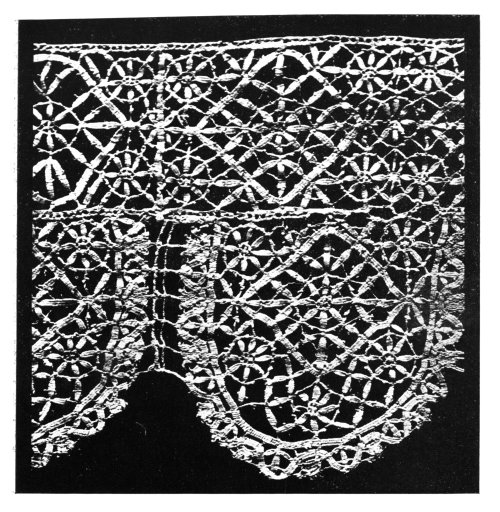
16th or 17th century Genoese lace

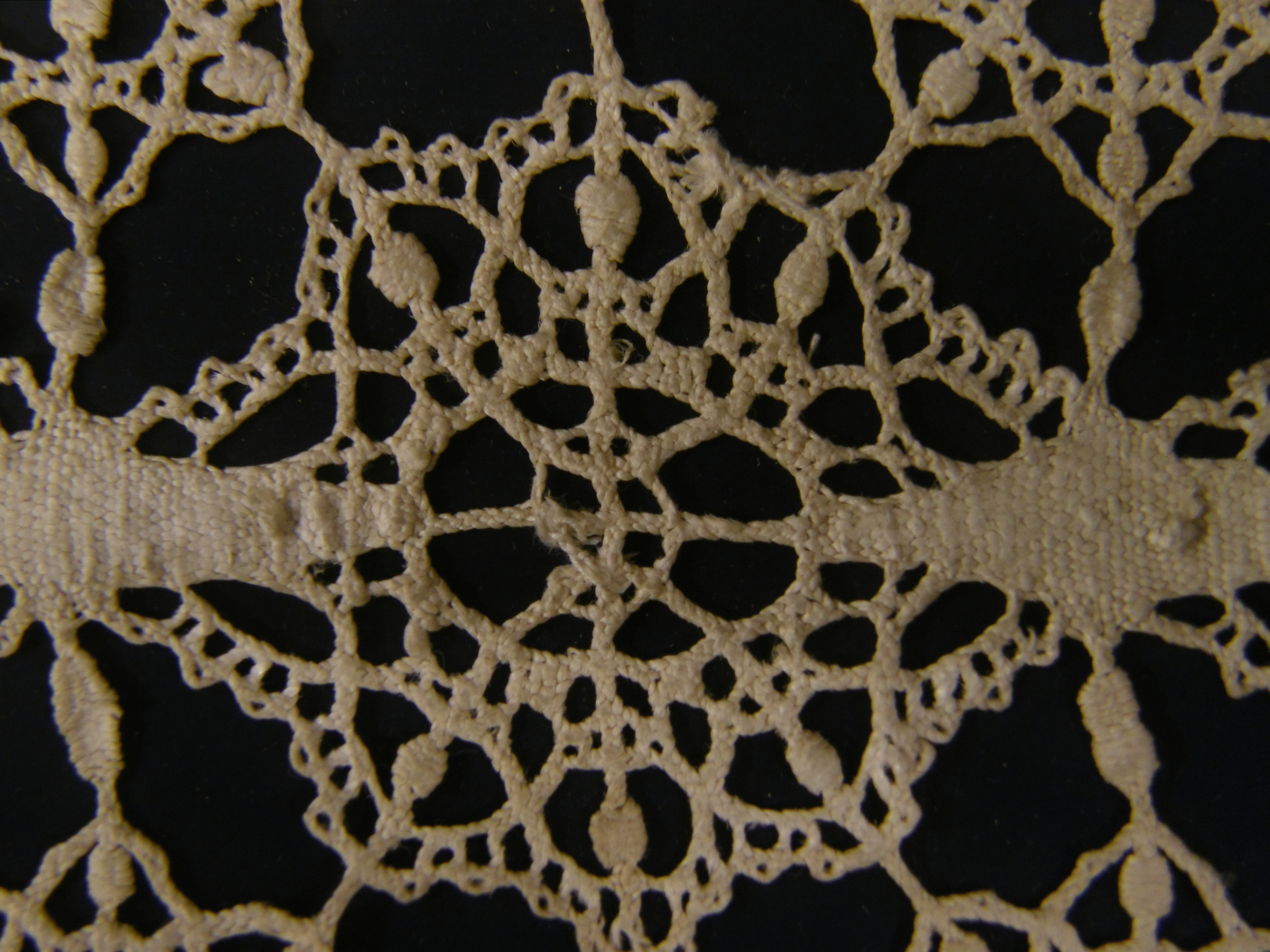
Genoese Bobbin lace, 1600-1625, Italian. V&A collection

Genoese lace is bobbin lace from Genoa. It is a guipure style of lace.

Bobbin lacemaking in Italy dates back to the 16th century when the main centres were Genoa and Milan, although Venice also made bobbin lace.

The Genoese laces were characterized by wheatears, small tightly woven leaf-shaped tallies which formed part of the usually geometric design.

Maltese lace was derived from Genoese lace.
