= Tumas Group =

Real estate and development company

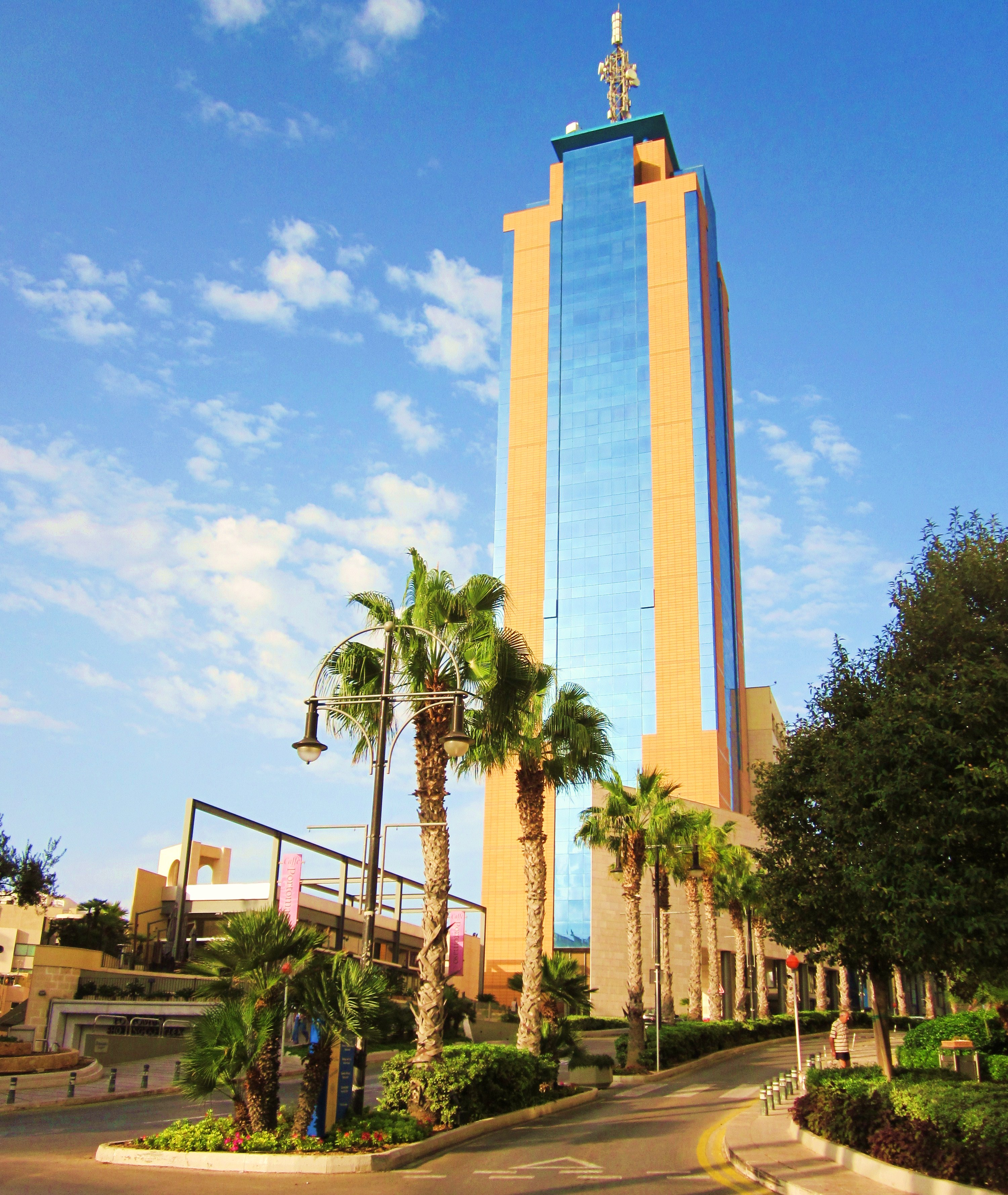
- Traded as: MSE: STS
- Industry: real estate
- Founded: July 14, 1987; 39 years ago
- Founder: Tumas Fenech
- Headquarters: Portomaso Business Tower, St Julian's, Malta
- Key people: Ray Fenech, Yorgen Fenech
- Revenue: €107 million (av. 2010-2020)
- Total assets: €454 million
- Total equity: €293 million
- Website: tumas.com

The Tumas Group is a real estate and development company in Malta, founded in the 1970s by Tumas Fenech. The group is headed by Raymond (Ray) Fenech. Tumas Group is active in online gaming, hospitality and leisure, management, property development, and transport and energy. Tumas Group is one of Malta's biggest companies, with a registered net equity of €293 million and total assets of €454 million, of which three-quarters consist of property. It averaged an annual €107 million of revenues and €13 million of profits from 2010 to 2020. The group fully owns some 25 companies, and its stocks are traded at the local exchange as Santumas Shareholdings, with a total market cap of €10.6 million. Its most popular brand is Portomaso, a complex of hotel, luxury apartments, restaurants and a casino in Paceville, St Julian's.

The group founder, Tumas Fenech, died in 1999. The ownership of the company passed to his children. George Fenech, the eldest son, was chairman of the group, expanding the family business into hospitality and gaming, until his death in 2014. Raymond Fenech, the youngest son of Tumas, took over the group, with other family members. In 2015 Antony Fenech exited the group and set up his own TUM Invest Group, retaining the automotive and healthcare arms of the Tumas Group. Yorgen Fenech was CEO of Tumas Group until his indictment in 2019, when Ray Fenech took back the reins.

Raymond and Yorgen Fenech co-own Glimmer Ltd, a gaming company implicated in the 2019 Malta political crisis, for which Yorgen Fenech stands charged. According to Mark Camilleri, the Tumas Group was created and expanded as "a textbook example of how local businesses grew by constant rent-seeking activities with the enabling and the backing of the state", with "political support across both major political parties".

== History ==
=== The origins ===
Tumas Fenech, then a police sergeant in Hamrun, and his sons opened the Easysell company in 1973, with a showroom in Qormi, to import and sell furniture and household items. The company was registered with the considerable capital of 30,000 Maltese lira, and it was soon put under general hypothec, with an overdraft facility by the newly nationalised Bank of Valletta. Thanks to access to credit, Easysell started operating as a speculator in the property market, signing various deals in the 1970s, including with people linked to the judiciary.

Tumas Fenech could count on the support of then-minister Lorry Sant and of Lino Spiteri, Maltese Labour politician (later deputy head of the Central Bank and Minister of trade) and of Maltese Labour Prime Minister Dom Mintoff. The closeness between Tumas Fenech and Lino Spiteri cost the latter the nomination in the 1992 Labour leadership race, then won by Alfred Sant, as Evarist Bartolo accused Spiteri of corruption.

=== Expansion in the hotel market ===
In the 1980s, Tumas Fenech expanded into the hotel market, buying the Dolmen and the Topaz hotels in Buġibba. In 1986, Tumas Fenech bought the Spinola Development Company for 120,000 Maltese lira, which had been founded by British and American investors to bring the Hilton to Malta; the company had obtained a public lease from the Nationalist government of 990 liri per year, for 150 years, for a 31-acres strip of public land in Paceville, where it had built a Hilton hotel.

In 1996, the new Nationalist government extended the Spinola land lease to Tumas Group until 2114, retaining the same yearly payment, and the company was allowed to use the land for other uses than tourism. The company finally bought back the lease in 2006 for a single payment of 800,000 Maltese lira (€1.8 million)

The Portomaso land grab was contested by left-wing activists, including Moviment Graffitti, who staged a hunger strike. The ensuing investigation by Ombudsman Joe Sammut reprimanded the government's failure “to use its negotiating powers to maximise the benefits to be derived from the deal”. Legislation was later amended, obliging the government to seek the Parliament's consent before selling public land for private interests.

Later, a new Hilton Malta and Portomaso Business Tower (2001) opened.

In March 2024, Tumas Group passed the cap of 1,000 hotel rooms in Malta, with the opening of his third Hilton hotel.

=== Foray into public transport ===
From July 2011 until 2014, Tumas Group was a minority shareholder (33%), together with Arriva, of a ten-year concession to operate all scheduled bus services on Malta and Gozo. Following years of losses, on 1 January 2014 Arriva ceased operations in Malta, with the services nationalised by the government as Malta Public Transport.

=== Expansion in the energy sector ===
The Group's turnover for 2011 was in excess of €112 million.

After 2013, with the Labour government led by Joseph Muscat, the Tumas group (at that point led by Tumas' son George Fenech and grandson Yorgen Fenech) expanded in the energy sector. Tumas group banded together with Michael Apap Bologna and Gasan Group to found ElectroGas Malta (EGM) as a consortium that also included Siemens Project Ventures GmbH and Socar Trading SA, aimed to build a €510 million new gas-powered plant in Delimara, which would produce electricity by burning liquified gas (LNG) imported from Azerbaijan. Electrogas was contracted to sell electricity and LNG to Enemalta for 18 years, started in 2015. The government provided Electrogas with an indefinite government guarantee, committing to cover its losses in case of failure to make a profit. The first batch of LNG was bought by Electrogas from SOCAR for $113 million and sold by them to Enemalta for $153 million, with further deliveries generating similar profits, however Electrogas recorded continued unexplained losses, with -€23 million in 2017. Daphne Caruana Galizia was investigating the Electrogas scheme when she was murdered on 16 October 2017. She was also investigating an unknown company named 17 Black. It was later learned that 17 Black was a Dubai-based company owned by Mr. Fenech which had made plans to pay millions to officials in Muscat's government.

The Auditor General's enquiry into the 2013 tender concluded that the tender was a “premeditated” effort to award the contract to Electrogas and that Electrogas' electricity price was significantly higher than that bought over the interconnector.

Yorgen Fenech resigned from director of Tumas Group and of Electrogas in 2019. His uncle Ray Fenech took over control of the group. On 25 November 2019 Tumas Group said that allegations linking Fenech to the murder of Daphne Caruana Galizia were "alien to the Tumas Group's values". Moira Fenech's shares in Tumas Group have been temporarily transferred to Malta government as a guarantee for Yorgen Fenech being released on bail. In November 2019, Ray Fenech had advised Yorgen Fenech to leave Malta to avoid his imminent arrest for murder and to avoid using credit cards "because of tracing".
