= Bedfordshire lace =

Type of bobbin lace made in the English Midlands

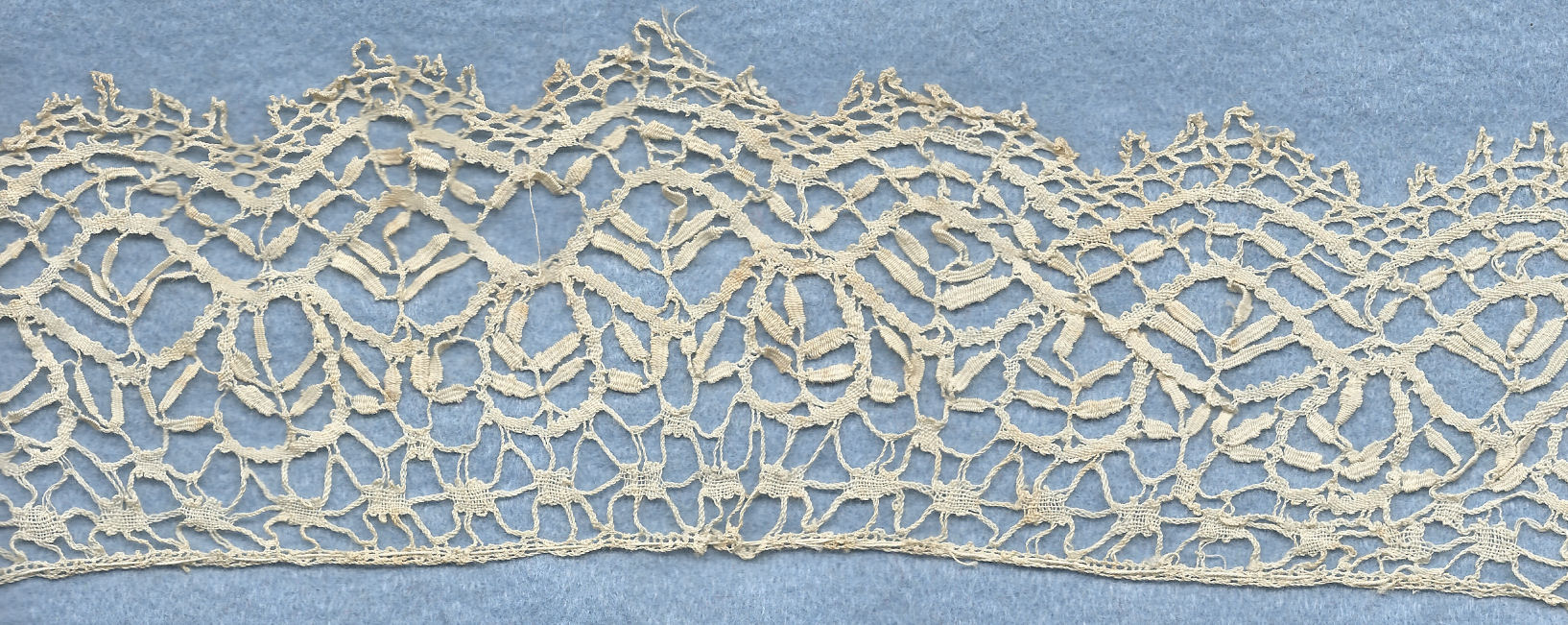
Bobbin lace made in the English Midlands

Bedfordshire lace is a style of bobbin lace originating from Bedfordshire in the 19th century, and made in the English Midlands lacemaking area. It was worked as a continuous width on a bolster pillow. It is a guipure style of lace.

== History of lacemaking in Bedfordshire ==
In the early years of the 16th century Catherine of Aragon was imprisoned in Ampthill, Bedfordshire for a short time whilst divorce proceedings were being taken against her by Henry VIII. Local tradition says that she taught the villagers lacemaking.

From the 16th century there are frequent references to the working of 'bone lace' being taught to the children of poor people in workhouses in order that they might earn something towards the cost of their keep.

Lace-makers from Flanders settled in Bedfordshire as early as the 16th century. By the mid-18th century, Newport Pagnell was a centre of Bedfordshire lace production.

The highpoint of lacemaking was from the late 17th century through the 18th century. However, the invention of the bobbinet machine in nearby Nottingham meant that machine-made lace could be made far more cheaply. The patterns of the hand-made lace changed to simpler styles to compete, and this became the modern Bedfordshire lace.

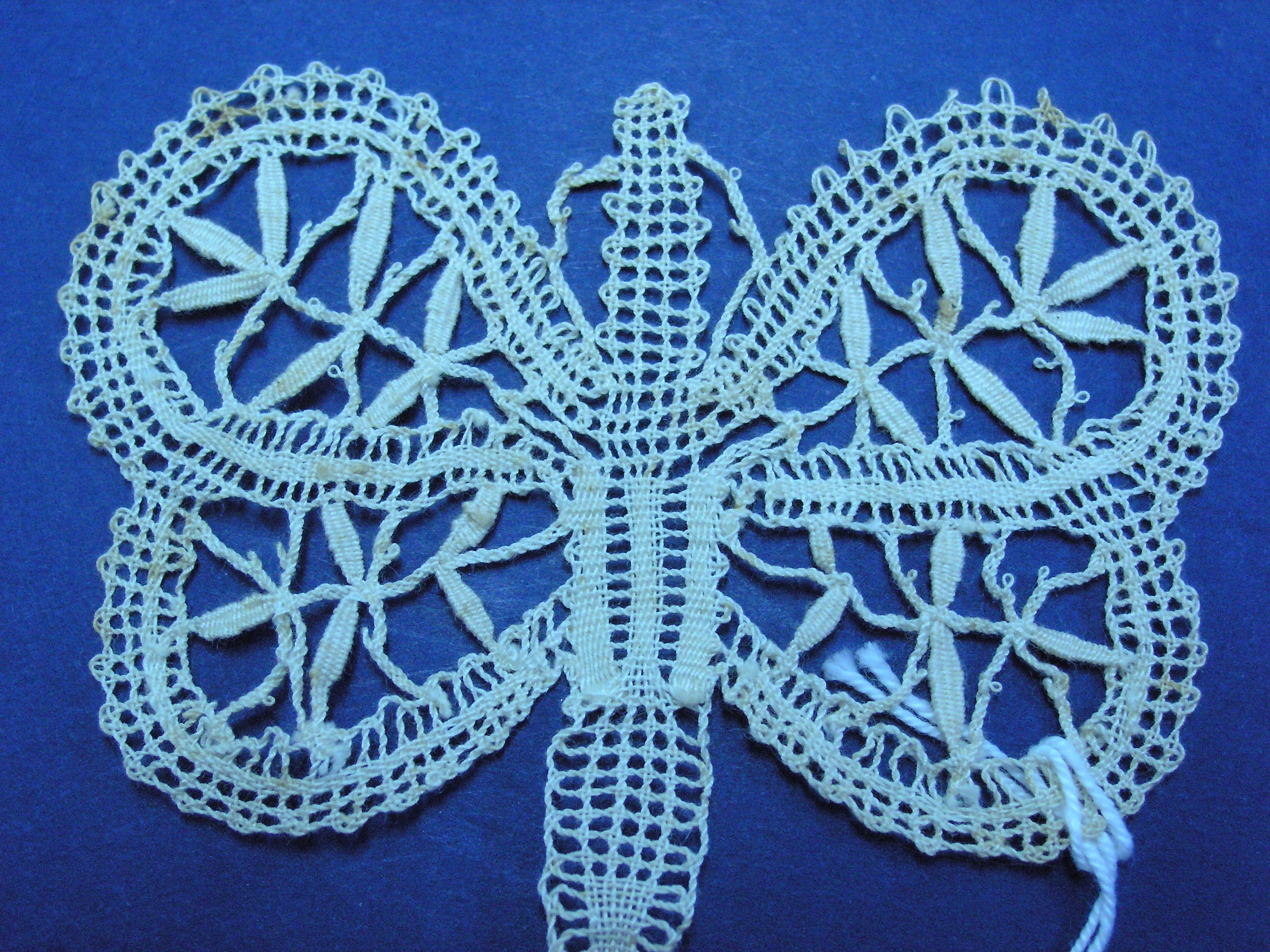
Lace (AM 1966.199-4)

== Style of Bedfordshire lace ==
Lace was made throughout Bedfordshire, Buckinghamshire, Northamptonshire and beyond. The styles of the lace made would have varied at different periods, reflecting what was fashionable at the time. In the 19th century, English lacemakers started to copy Maltese lace which became popular after it was exhibited in The Great Exhibition, but adapted it to produce their own style.

This style, now described as Bedfordshire or Beds lace, often has a plaited headside known as nine pin. Plaits, sometimes with picots, and tallies are common. There are flowing lines, called cloth trails. The forms created are often organic and naturalistic, representing flowers, plants and other forms from the natural world., possibly influenced by the Honiton style.

Bedfordshire lace can be viewed at the Higgins Art Gallery & Museum in Bedford and at the Cowper and Newton Museum in Olney.
