= Republic Square, Valletta =

Square in Valletta, Malta

Coordinates: 35°53′54.5″N 14°30′48.5″E

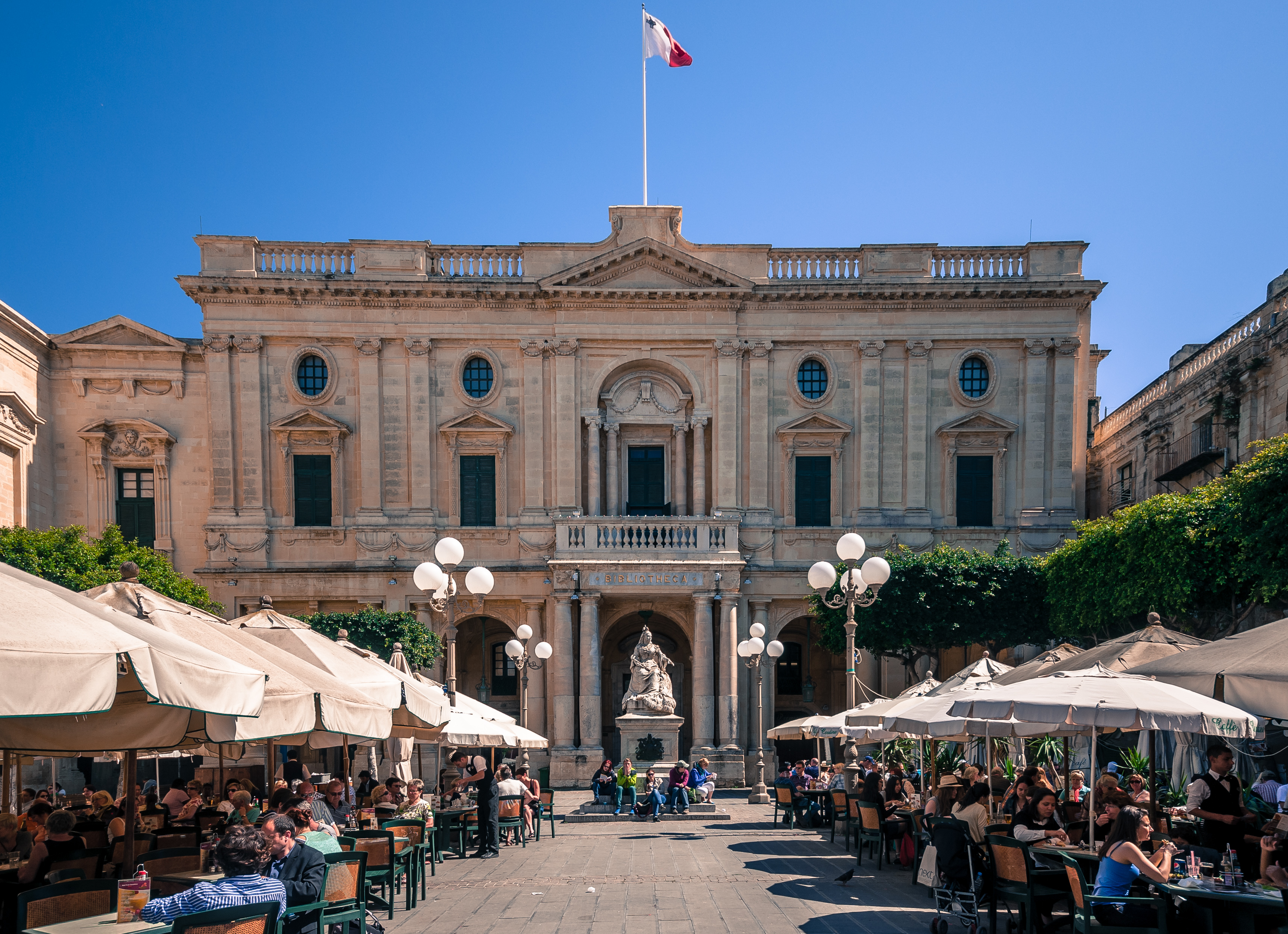
The façade of the Bibliotheca and the open air cafés at Republic Square

Republic Square (Maltese: Misraħ ir-Repubblika) is a piazza in Valletta, Malta. The square was originally called Piazza Tesoreria or Piazza dei Cavallieri, since the treasury of the Order of Saint John was located in the square. After a statue of Queen Victoria was installed in the square in the 19th century, it became known as Queen's Square or Piazza Regina (Maltese: Pjazza Reġina). Although its official name is Republic Square, it is still commonly referred to as Piazza Regina.

Original	Informal	French	British	British post-1926	Maltese
Piazza dei Cavallieri o della Tesoreria	Piazza della Città	Place de l’Egalité	Piazza Regina	Victoria Square	Pjazza Reġina / Pjazza Repubblika

== Layout ==
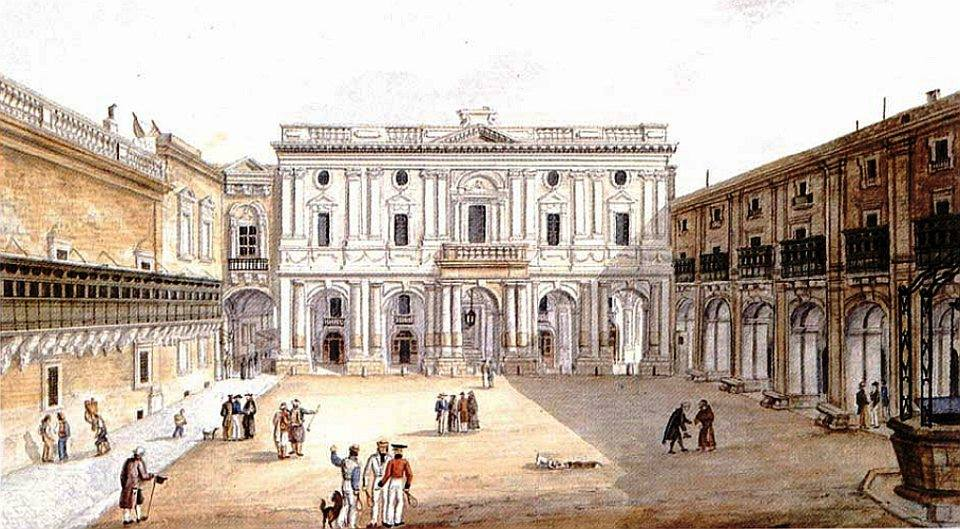
Piazza Tesoreria without any monuments, as depicted in a watercolour by Charles de Brocktorff (before 1850)

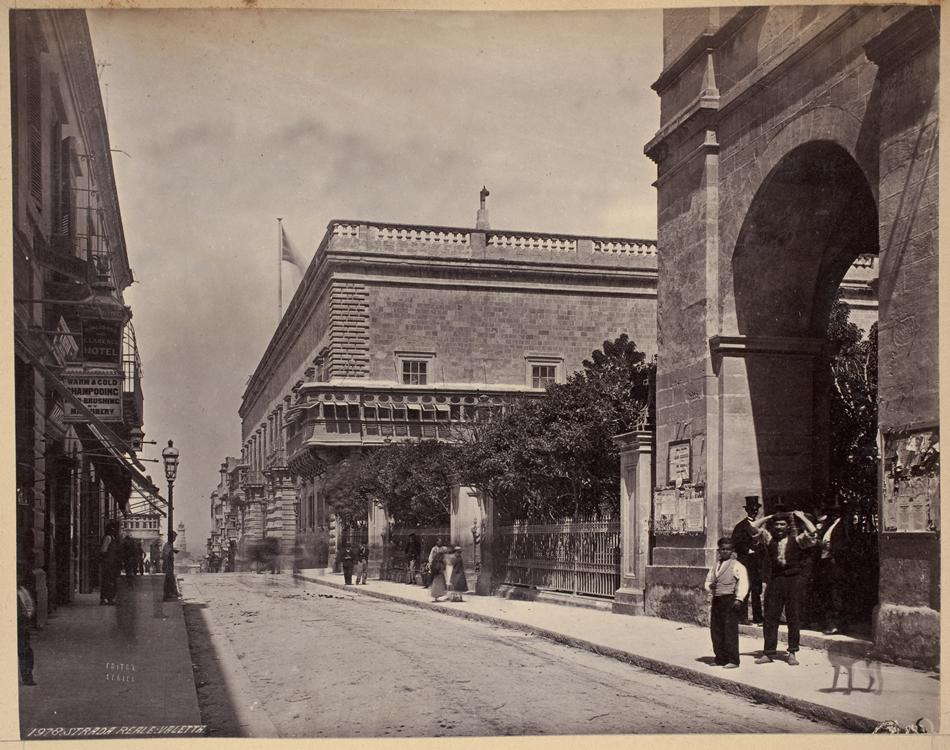
Piazza Tesoreria as a closed orchard during the Governorship of John Le Marchant, 1858-1864; photo by Francis Frith

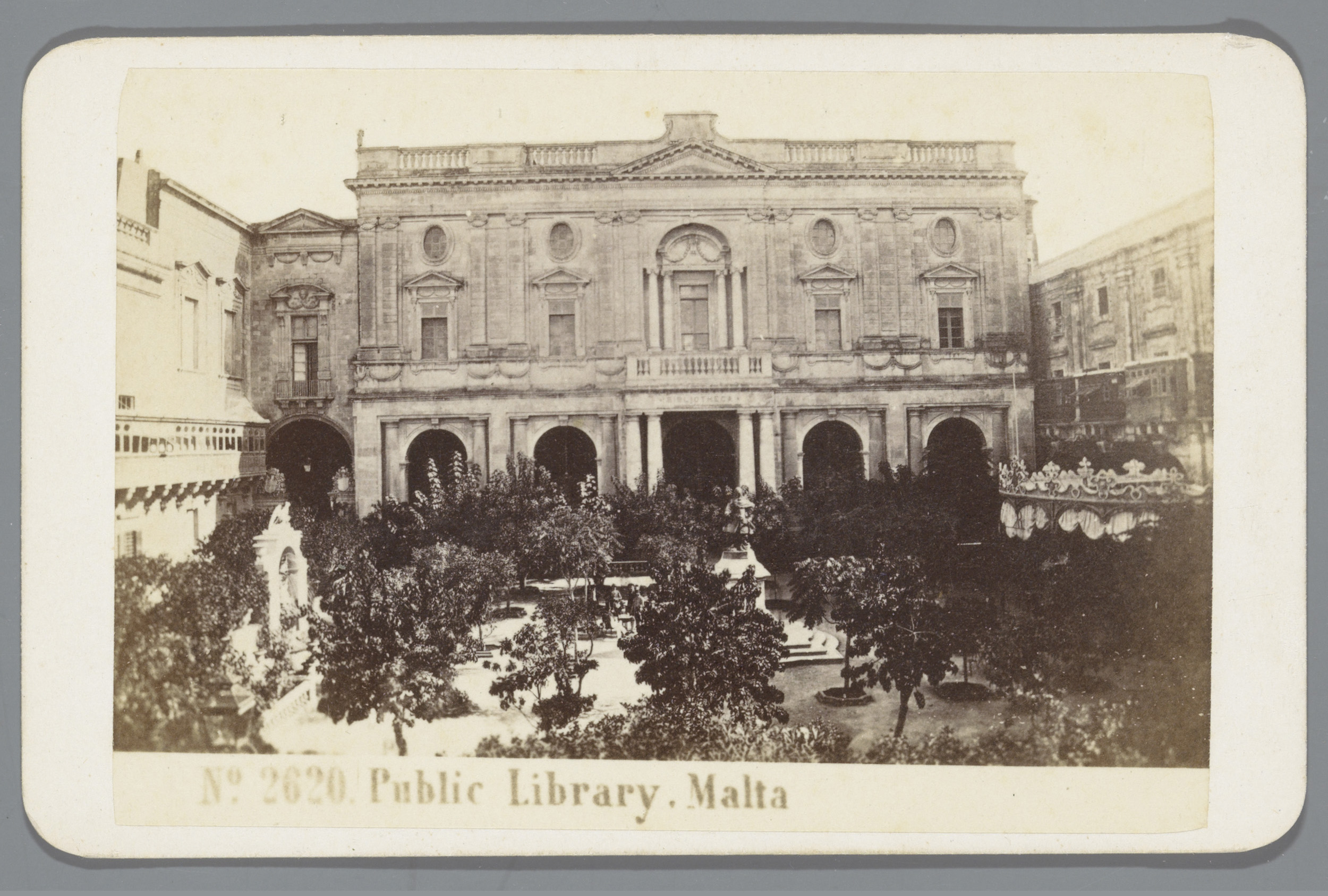
Piazza Tesoreria with the Vilhena statue and orchard, as depicted in a 19th century photo by Giorgio Sommer

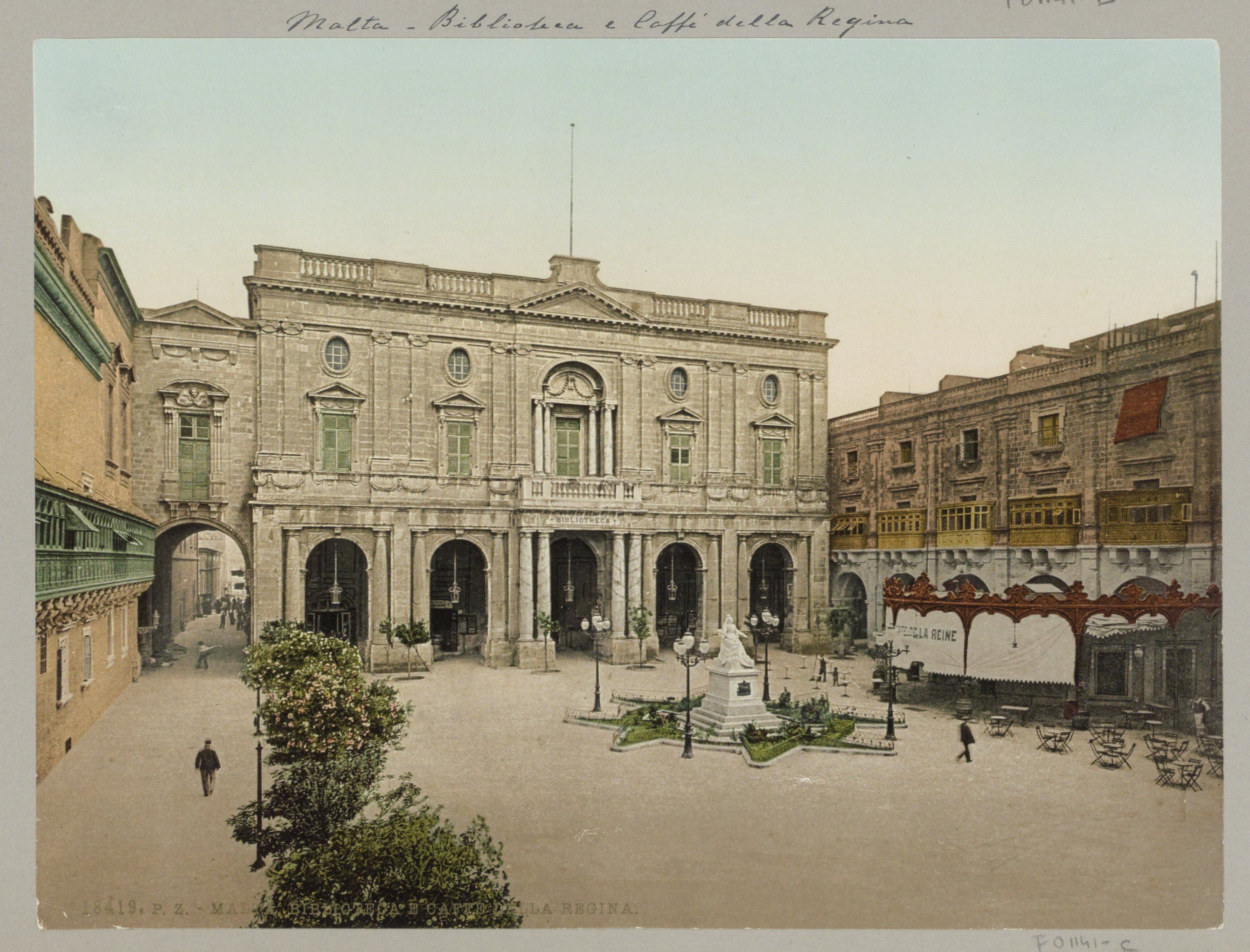
Piazza Regina with the Queen Victoria statue, as depicted in a photochrome print from the early 1900s

Originally the site was a square called Piazza dei Cavalieri, but during the British period Governor Gaspard Le Marchant enclosed the space to create a British-access only orchard. Some photos of the orchard form part of a historic photograph collection of Malta.

At one point, Le Marchant moved the statue of Grand Master Manoel de Vilhena from Fort Manoel to the middle of this piazza. In 1887 this statue was moved to Floriana, and replaced by a statue of Queen Victoria in commemoration of her Golden Jubilee.

The northwest part of the square consists of a large building originally known as the Casa del Commun Tesoro. The building housed the accounts, contracts and records of the treasury of the Order of Saint John. The first post office in Malta was opened in the building in 1708, and part of it remained a post office until 1849. Over the years, La Casa del Comun Tesoro also housed government offices, a hotel and a cinema. The building was damaged in World War II, but it was repaired and it now houses the Casino Maltese. Some parts of the ground floor are occupied by cafés and shops.

The southeast side of the square, facing the Casa del Commun Tesoro, is the National Library of Malta, commonly known as the Bibliotheca. The building was commissioned when larger premises were required for the Order's library. It was designed by the Polish Italian architect Stefano Ittar, and was completed in 1796. Due to the French occupation of Malta, the library did not open until Malta became a British protectorate. It was officially inaugurated by Civil Commissioner Sir Hildebrand Oakes in 1812. The library has remained there ever since.

The square's northeast side is part of the Grandmaster's Palace, while the southwest side is a shopping arcade.

In 1858, a bronze statue of António Manoel de Vilhena was moved from Fort Manoel to the centre of the square. The statue of de Vilhena was later relocated to the Mall Gardens in Floriana, and it is currently in Pope John XXIII Square, also in Floriana.

A statue of Queen Victoria was erected instead of the de Vilhena statue in 1891, giving the square the name of Queen's Square or Piazza Regina. The statue was restored in 2011, and it is often a resting place for pigeons.

Today, the open space of the square is used by open air cafés and restaurants.

Public mourning of the death of Queen Victoria by her statue in then- Piazza Tesoreria, August 1901:

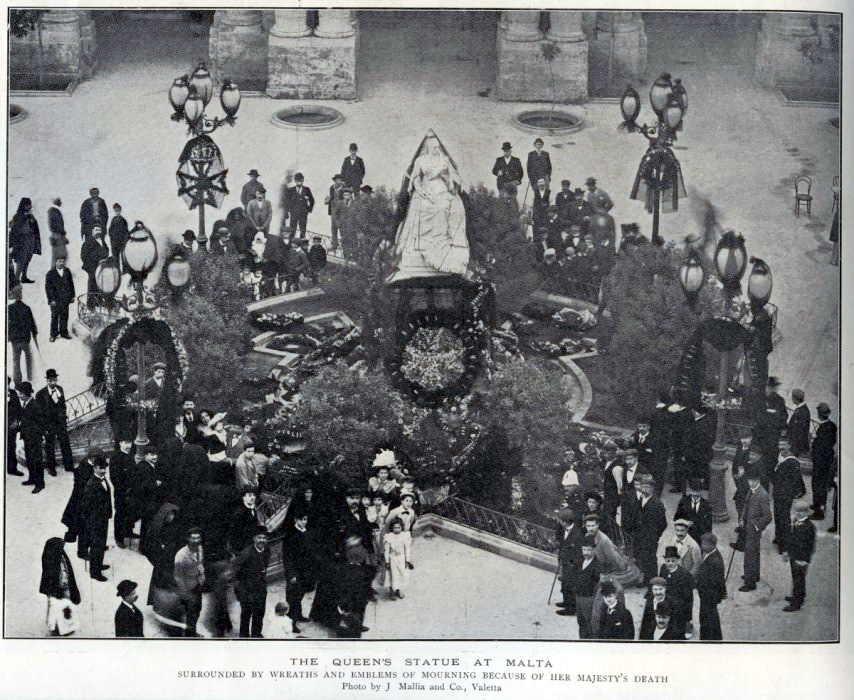
J.Mallia

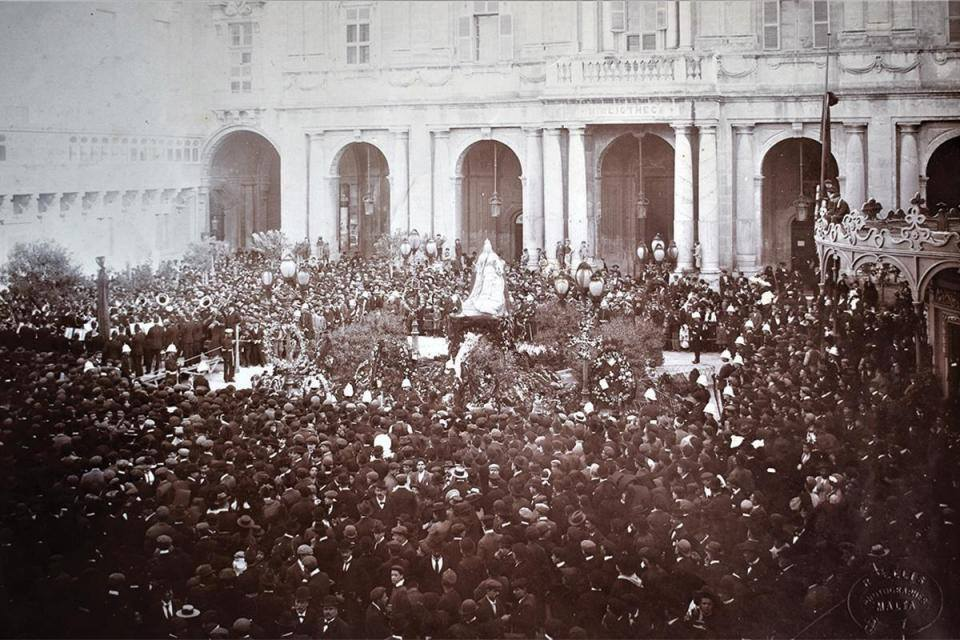
Richard Ellis

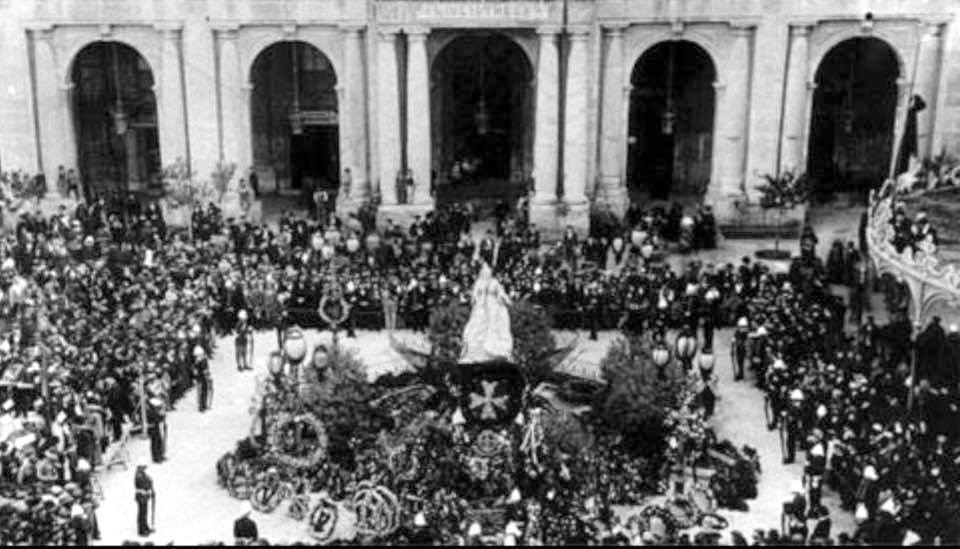
