= Moviment Graffitti =

Left-wing organisation in Malta

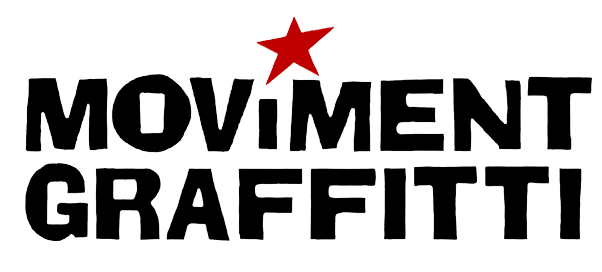
- Formation: 1994
- Headquarters: Valletta
- Location: 67, Strait Street
- Region served: Malta
- Key people: Andre Callus
- Website: movimentgraffitti.org/en/

Moviment Graffitti is a left-leaning, environmentalist, non governmental organisation, and pressure group in Malta.

Moviment Graffitti promotes an amalgamation of leftist sociopolitical ideas, mainly human rights, equality, environmentalism and anti-fascism. It was founded in 1994.

== History ==
Founded in 1994, the movement has maintained a central message promoting anti-racist, socially liberal and environmental sustainability ideologies despite a regular turnover of activists throughout three decades.

Journalist and former member James Debono describes the movement as "playfully left wing, anti-racist, socially liberal and largely focused on land use issues", listing French philosopher Louis Althusser and the musical activists Rage Against the Machine as influences in the movement's early formation and inspiring members' counterculture-based sense of identity.

In the 1990s, members largely relied on leaflets and pamphlets distributed at the University of Malta campus to communicate, as later captured in Guze Stagno's novel Inbid ta’ Kuljum and in Karl Schembri's Il-Manifest tal-Killer. Both Stagno and Schembri are former members of the organisation.

The organisation initially used the premises of the defunct Maltese Communist Party in Strait Street, Valletta.

Current prominent members of the movement include Andre Callus (since the early 2000s) and sociologist Dr Angele Deguara. Ex-prominent members of the movement include LGBTI and pro-Palestine activist Alex Caruana.

== Ideology ==
The organisation's ideological references shifted between Marxism and anarchism, green politics and new left throughout the years.

Moviment Graffitti describes itself as standing "against the oppression and exploitation of people, the environment and animals", and for "social justice, equality and sustainability", "with a vision of freedom and radical democracy".

=== Issues ===
Moviment Graffitti is known to campaign for issues related to fairer workers’ rights (such as an increase in the minimum wage), promoting economic and social equality, and protesting environment destruction, illegal developments and the privatisation of public space.

The organisation has also advocated for the right of migration for all and against a world with man-made borders, as well as working to eradicate racism and xenophobia by organising actions and information campaigns as well as pushing for migrants’ rights.

Moviment Graffitti has also campaigned for international solidarity with the plight of Palestinians in the Israeli–Palestinian conflict, arguing that they face cruel and constant injustice and discrimination at the hands of the Israeli state.

=== Political positions ===
Moviment Graffittii used to be close to the activists of Żminijietna (Voice of the Left), a similar left-wing organisation, for a brief period around 2000. While before 1996 it was openly supportive of the Malta Labour Party, it later switched to closeness to Alternattiva Demokratika, Malta's green party, for whom it briefly worked as recruitment pool. Yet, it also cooperated with other organisations such as Studenti Demokristjani Maltin during the 1996 stipend protests. The group presently maintains a strategic policy of refusing to endorse any political party.

Its main campaigns have been on land use issues, consistently protesting overdevelopment under any government, and building coalitions with different allies.

In terms of political positions, Moviment Graffitti opposed the 1994 Maltese concordat on marriage, called for the decriminalisation of abortion, endorsed Alfred Sant's Labour at the 1996 elections, and in 2000 supported Malta's EU accession bid. In 2011 Moviment Graffitti participated in the divorce referendum, campaigning for a yes vote.

=== Tactics ===
Moviment Graffitti's most visible activities are direct actions to draw public attention to specific issues, including protest demonstrations, banner-drops, and sit-ins.

Actions have included activists chaining themselves to the trucks and barges, and carrying out hunger strikes.

While remaining autonomous from economic interests or political parties, Moviment Graffitti has regularly built coalitions and networks with like-minded stakeholders to work as a common front on issues such as racism, destruction of natural landscape and animal rights. It has regularly supported workers' struggles and voiced its stance in favour of workers' rights.

Moviment Graffitti frequently holds awareness-raising campaigns where it distributes information and engages in discussions in public spaces and other venues such as universities, schools, and youth centres via film-nights, talks, and discussions.

The movement has no formal organisation and decisions are taken during regular assembly meetings where anyone who shares the organisation's vision and principles can attend and contribute. Their activities are self-funded through membership-payment and fund-raising events held throughout the year.

== Campaigns ==
=== Workers’ rights & anti-capitalism ===
In 1996, Moviment Graffitti held its first anti-McDonald's day, protesting against multinationals' exploitation of workers and the "brutal way in which animals are raised" and butchered. The event occurred yearly until 2010.

In 1997 Moviment Graffitti proposed the introduction of a 35-hour work week.

In August 2008, Moviment Graffitti joined the campaign against the privatisation of the shipyard. Following the lead of the General Workers Union who represented the workers, Moviment Graffitti showed its support and participated in the mass rally held by GWU. Later that year, on the 13th of November, Moviment Graffitti also joined GWU in its protest march against the increase in utility rates.

Starting from October 2016, Moviment Graffitti launched a campaign attempting to increase the minimum wage and wages in ġeneral tilted the, Decent Wages Tour. The organisation toured several localities to inform the public about the campaign and get their support. In April 2017, the government increased the minimum wage by a weekly €8, however activists said that it fell short of their expectations.

Together with 16 other organisations, Moviment Graffitti launched a campaign for rent regulation in February 2018. Several proposals were put forward including: A tax regime that incentivises long-lets through lower tax rates for longer leases; The possibility for landlords to increase rent-prices yearly during the duration of a contract by a percentage that does not exceed the cost-of-living-increase percentage; A tax on empty rentable property that disincentivizes rent on the black market and increases the amount of properties for rent; and Regulation of Agencies and a legal standing to a Tenants’ Union. The new law including some of these proposals was passed in 2019 and came into force in 2020.

September 2022 saw the launch of a living income study which Moviment Graffitti commissioned together with General Workers Union and the Alliance against Poverty. The study found that 76% of single parent households do not earn a living income, while almost 40% of the two-parent household earn less than the established living income.

=== Environmental protection & over-development ===
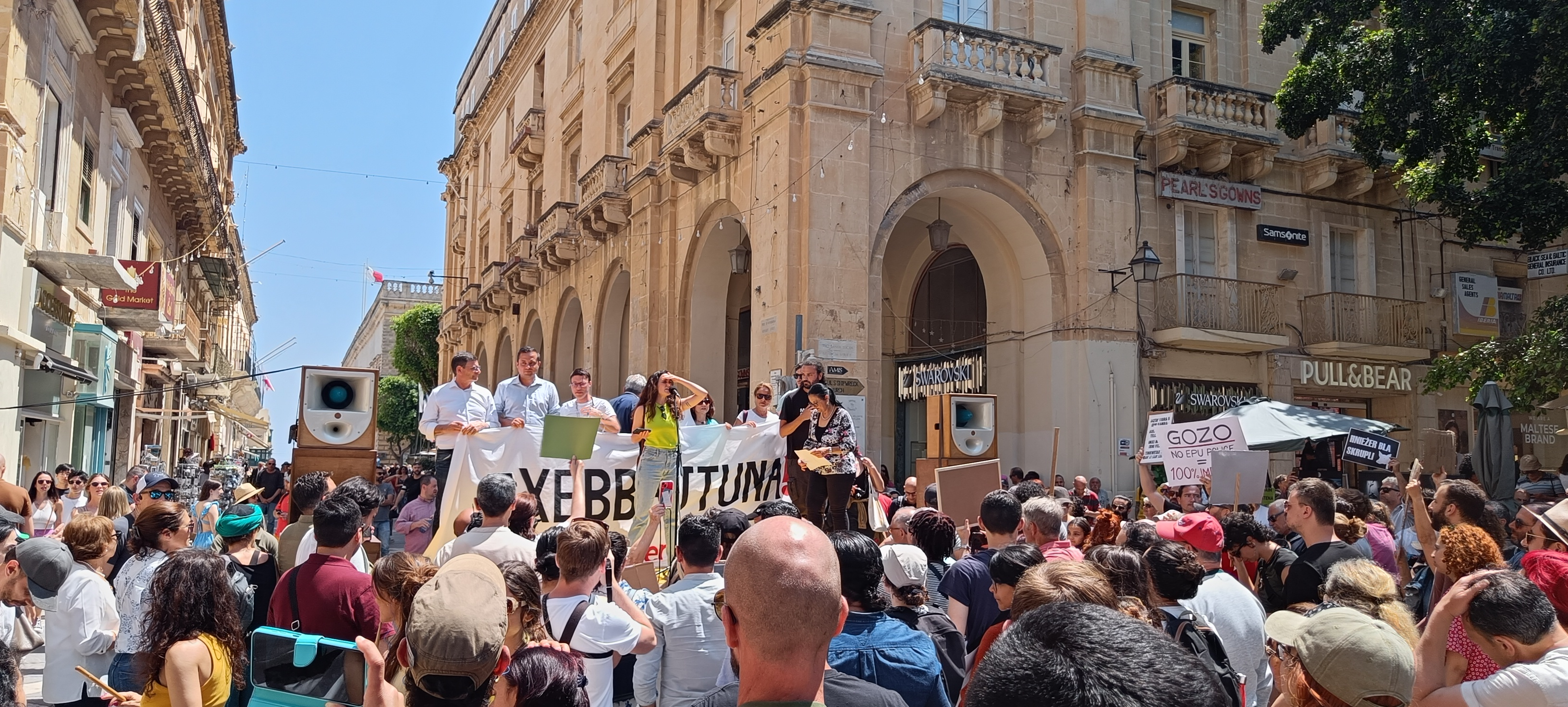
Xebbajtuna protests in 2023

In 1996 Moviment Graffitti started a campaign against a proposed development for a Hilton hotel. This campaign started when the Tumas Group bought the land for Lm191,000. A later investigation by the Ombudsman found that there were a number of irregularities in the planning permit.

In 1998 Moviment Graffitti and several other organisations established the Front against Golf Course in response to the proposed Ta’ Ċenċ golf course, arguing that against the “development of golf courses located on land used for agricultural uses or on land which has ecological value”. This campaign continued for years with numerous articles, demonstrations and protests.

Moviment Graffitti was also active in later successful campaigns against golf courses, including a proposed golf course at Verdala by developers AX Holdings in 2002, as well as at Xagħra l-Ħamra near Għajn Tuffieħa in 2005 and once again at Ta’ Ċenċ. Moviment Graffitti was included in the coalition against the golf courses which included organisations such as the Gaia Foundation, Nature Trust, Friends of the Earth, Birdlife Malta, and the Ramblers Association as well as farmers from the areas.

The organisation was active in campaigns against development in the Kalkara valley, the development of villas in Ramla l-Ħamra, Malta's Planning Authority, and the extension of a power station.

In 2015 Moviment Graffitti was part of Front Ħarsien ODZ, a group protesting against the proposed development in the Żonqor area in Marsascala by developers Sadeen as part of the American University of Malta.

In 2016 Moviment Graffitti conducted a campaign on access to Manoel Island in which the group cut through the gates and fences providing access to the public.

Over 2018 and 2019 the organisation coordinated a series of successful direct actions asking for a change in the law which allowed fuel stations to be relocated on ODZ. In 2020 the law was amended as demanded.

In 2018, Moviment Graffitti joined local residents in Pembroke in opposing the development of a hotel by developers DB group on what was the grounds of the Institute of Tourism Studies.

In September 2019 Moviment Graffitti organised a national protest titled Iż-Żejjed Kollu Żejjed (Enough is Enough) demanding a more environmental-sensitive construction industry and radical changes in Malta's planning policies.

The organisation has led campaigns against the building of roads on arable land in Dingli, private development in Balluta bay, a proposed yacht marina in Marsascala, and commercial activity on Comino.

=== Feminism and women's rights ===
In August 1995, the group held a sit-in against Malta's stand on abortion, calling for it to be legalised. In 2019, the group were co-founders of the coalition in favour of decriminalising abortion: Voice for Choice. Later that year, the coalition held the first pro-choice rally which has been held yearly since.

In 2016, Moviment Graffitti, together with the Women's Rights Foundation, campaigned calling for full access to the morning-after pill.

The organisation also campaigns on issues related to domestic violence and femicide.

=== Civil rights ===
The group has called for the introduction of divorce since its inception and supported its introduction in 2011. In 1997, it called for the rights of trans people to be able to have gender affirmation surgery. It also participated in Malta's first pride march in 2004.

=== Student issues ===
Moviment Graffitti joined a number of student organisations in protesting against announced changes to the stipend system in 1997.

Moviment Graffitti and its members led the Front Against Censorship which started in 2009 following the ban of a satirical student newspaper Ir-Realta, edited by Mark Camilleri, then a member of Moviment Graffitti.

=== International Issues & neutrality ===
In 1997, two Moviment Graffitti activists (one of whom was Mark Camilleri) were arrested and charged for throwing red paint on top of an American warship, the USS O'Bannon, and for involuntarily damaging police uniforms Nevertheless, activists from the group have continued to oppose the presence of warships in Malta.

Moviment Graffitti has also protested against the Israeli occupation of Palestine. In 2010, following an incident in which two Israeli soldiers shot a Maltese citizen in her leg while in Gaza, Moviment Graffitti and other NGOs issued a call for an Israeli boycott.

== List of campaigns ==
- Against Hilton development with Front Kontra l-Hilton (1994–1997) with Friends of the Earth Malta and YMCA activist Jean Paul Mifsud;
- Against the creation of Junior College to replace Sixth Form (1995)
- School stipend protests (1996)
- Anti McDonald's Day (1995–2000)
- Verdala golf course with Front Kontra l-Golf Kors (2000–2004)
- Took part in anti-ACTA Protest (2012)
- Solidarity with Palestinians march (2012)
- Solidarity with Palestinians march (2014)
- Gathering in favor of YES vote in the 2015 Greek bailout referendum (2015)
- Nakba Commemoration Gathering in Valletta (2015)
- Żonqor AUM development with Front Ħarsien ODZ (2015)
- Commemoration of killing of four boys in Gaza beach in 2014 Israel-Gaza war (July 2015)
- Manoel Island with Kamp Emerġenza Ambjent (2016–2018), with Brikkuni frontman Mario Vella
- Paceville Masterplan with Kamp Emerġenza Ambjent (2016–2017)
- Increase in Minimum Wage (2017–2018)
- Rent Control Proposal (2018)
- Iż-Żejjed Kollu Żejjed Protest (2019)
- Black Lives Matter (2020)
- Xebbajtuna Protest (2023)

== Persons linked with Moviment Graffitti ==
- Mary Grace Vella, sociologist
- James Debono, journalist
- Michael Briguglio, later chairman of Alternattiva Demokratika, PN candidate at the 2019 European elections, sociologist
- Alex Sciberras, lawyer, then Labour mayor of Msida
- Mark Vella and Guze Stagno, novelists
- Aleks Farrugia, former editor of It-Torca
- Jurgen Balzan, then Alternattiva Demokratika and journalist
- Silvan Agius, Policy Director of ILGA Europe 2000–2003, AD MEP candidate in 2014; director of human rights and integration for Helena Dalli's ministry
- Chris Mizzi, Commonwealth youth worker
- Mark Camilleri, then founder of Ir-Realtà and Front Against Censorship, former head of the National Book Council (2013–2021)
- David Pisani, activist for Zminijietna
- Monique Agius, chairperson of the first Front Harsien ODZ, then PD candidate at the 2018 elections and activist of Civil Society Network
- Andre Callus, advocate for migrant rights and environmental activist

== Bibliography ==
- Michael Briguglio, THE ZONQOR CONFLICT IN MALTA, ANUARI DEL CONFLICTE SOCIAL 2015
- Michael Briguglio (2015). ‘Ten Years of Malta's EU Membership - The Impact on Maltese Environmental NGOs.’ Reflections of a Decade of EU Membership: Expectations, Achievements, Disappointments and the Future, Occasional Papers, No. 7, Institute for European Studies (Malta)
