= Guipure =

Type of bobbin lace in which motifs are connected by bars or plaits

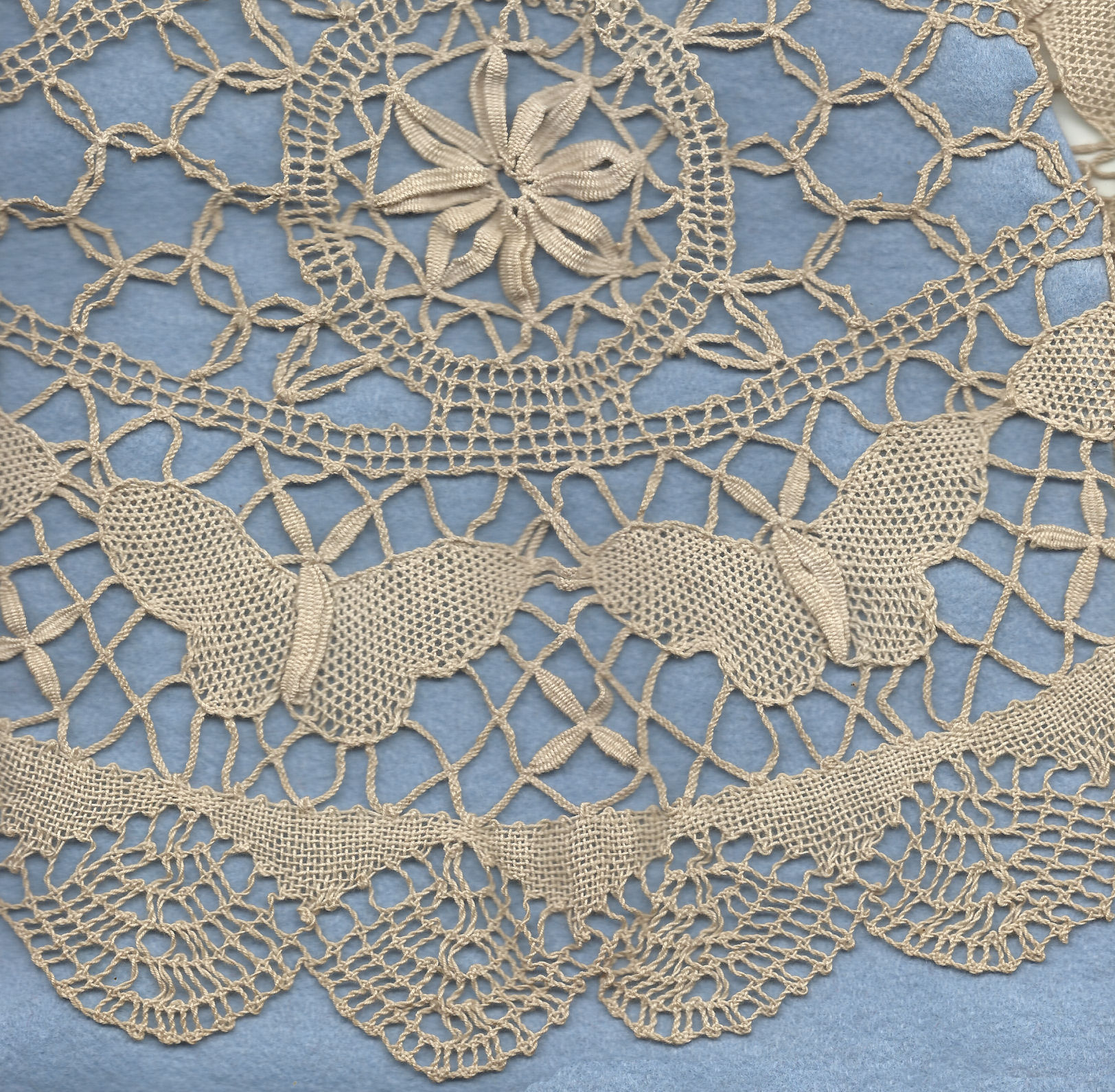
Example of Guipure lace with a Torchon edge

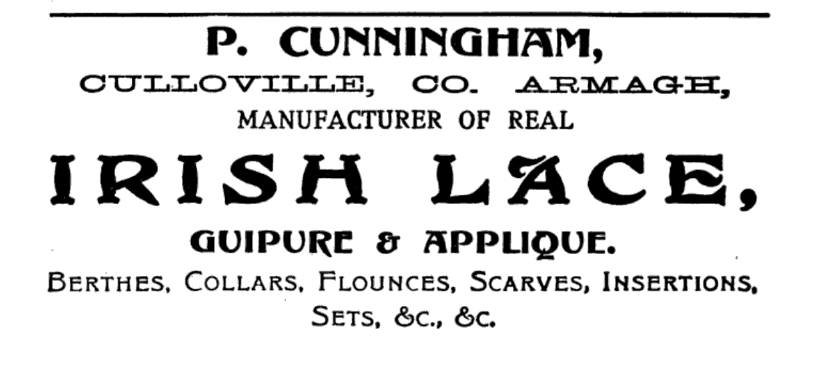
Cunningham Lace, advert, 1907, Irish International Exhibition

Guipure lace is a type of bobbin lace. It connects the motifs with bars or plaits rather than net or mesh.

Guipure is a French word. It used to describe lace which has a gimp or thicker thread to outline the pattern, but this is no longer used.

Genoese lace was a guipure lace. Genoese lacemakers went to Malta to found the style of Maltese lace. This later inspired the style of English lace known as Bedfordshire lace.

Another guipure lace is Cluny lace, which originated in France, but spread elsewhere, such as the English lacemaking areas.
