= Cluny lace =

Type of bobbin lace

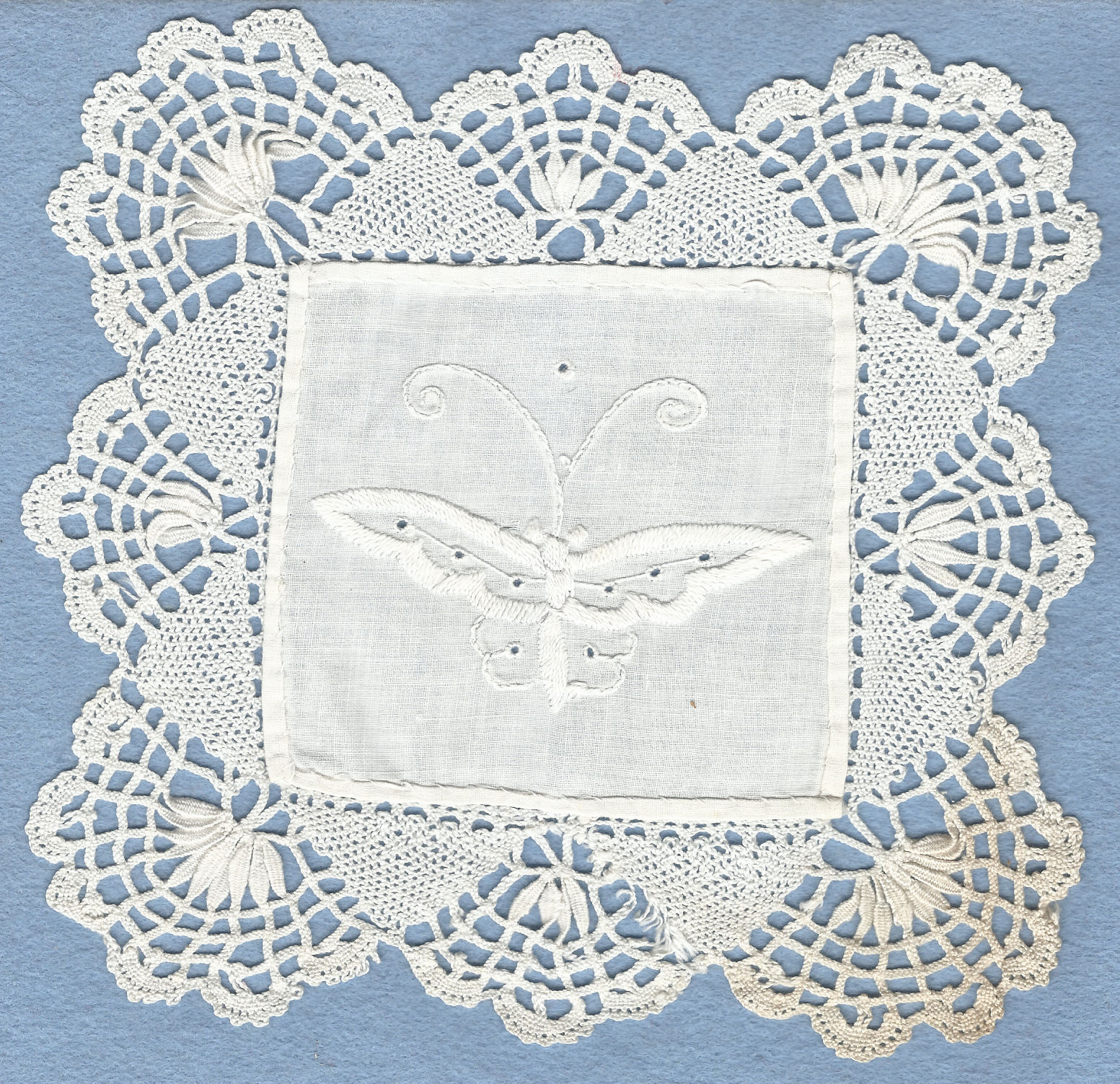
Mat with Cluny lace edging

Cluny lace is a bobbin lace style, worked as a continuous piece. It is a heavy plaited lace of geometric design, often with radiating thin, pointed wheatears (closely woven leaves). It is a guipure style of lace.

== History ==
Cluny lace originated in France. It appeared in the nineteenth century in Le Puy and Mirecourt in Lorraine, reputedly using designs from the Museum of Antiquities at the Hotel Cluny, Paris.

Cluny lace was also made in the English Midland lacemaking areas. The laces shares common features with Bedfordshire lace.
