= Casa del Commun Tesoro =

Building in Valletta, Malta

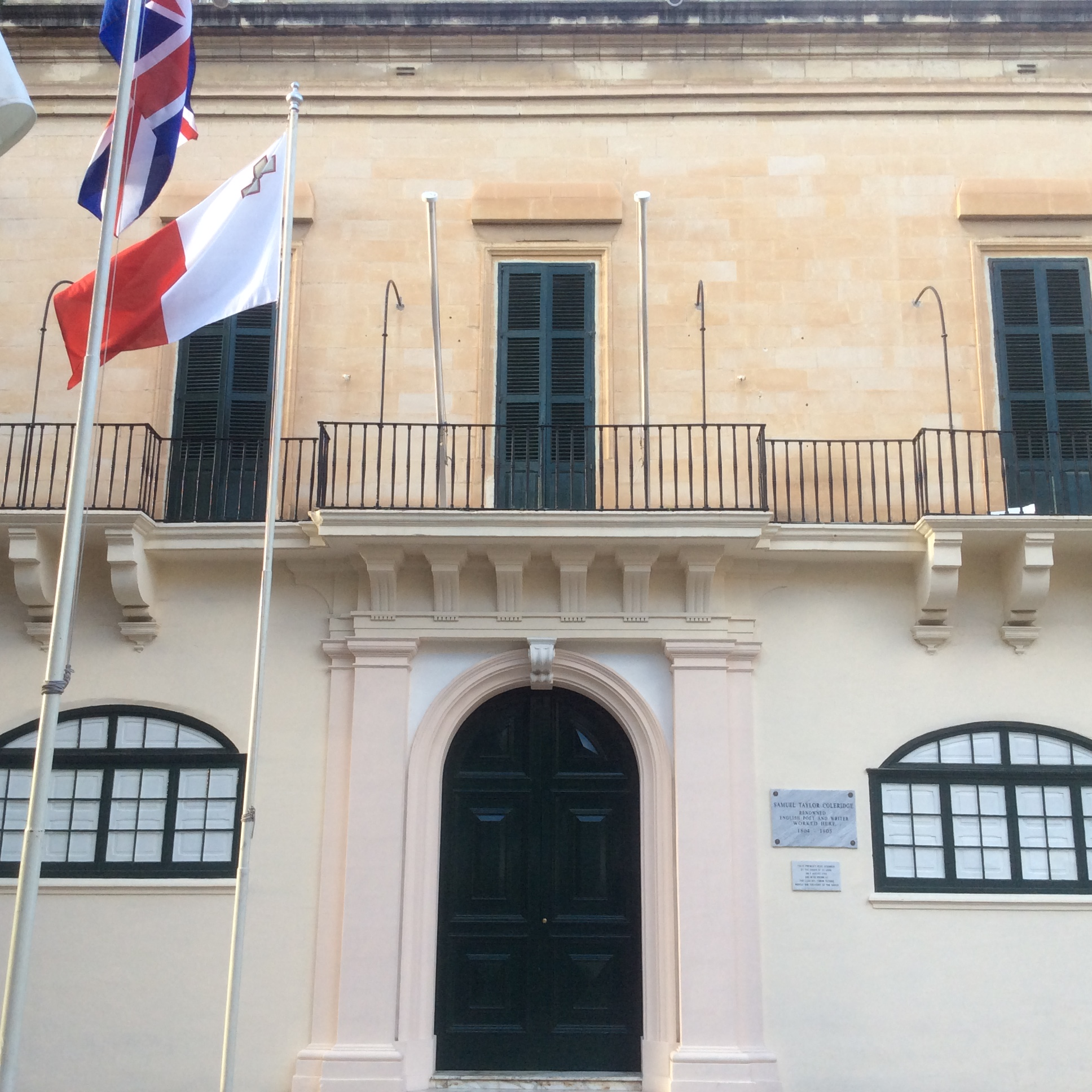
- 247, Republic Street, Valletta
- Interactive map of the Casa del Commun Tesoro area
- Former names: Grand Hotel
- Alternative names: Casino Maltese

General information
- Status: Intact
- Location: Valletta, Malta
- Coordinates: 35°53′55.3″N 14°30′47″E
- Current tenants: Casino Maltese
- Completed: c. 16th–17th centuries
- Renovated: 1914

Technical details
- Material: Limestone
- Floor count: 2

Renovating team
- Architects: Nicola Buhagiar and Francesco Sammut

The Casa del Commun Tesoro (Italian for House of the National Treasury), or Casa dei Conti del Tesoro, is a building in Valletta, Malta, located in Republic Square facing the Bibliotheca. It was originally built to house the Treasury of the Order of St. John. Part of the building housed Malta's first post office, and over the years it was also used as government offices, a hotel and a cinema. Since the early 20th century, it has been the premises of a gentlemen's club known as the Casino Maltese.

== History ==
The original building was most likely designed by Girolamo Cassar. The Casa del Commun Tesoro originally belonged to the Treasury of the Order of St. John, and it housed the Treasury's accounts, contracts and records. It remained housing the treasury until the 19th century.5 Gold and silver bullion were stored at the Conservatoria, located opposite the Casa del Commun Tesoro. This building was demolished in the 1780s to make way for the Bibliotheca. The Treasury was headed by a Grand Commander, who was assisted by two Procurators of the Treasury, a Procurator of the Grand Master, a Conventual Conservator and a Secretary. The latter resided in an apartment within the Casa del Commun Tesoro.

In 1708, Malta's first proper postal service was established, and a room within the Casa del Commun Tesoro became the island's first post office. The building continued to house the Packet Office until around 1841, when it was transferred to the Banca Giuratale. On 1 April 1849, the Island Post Office was also transferred from the Casa del Commun Tesoro to the Banca Giuratale, which later became known as the General Post Office.

In the early 19th century, the British used the building for a number of public offices, including the Chief Secretary's Office, the office of the Collector of Land Revenue and the Government Treasury.

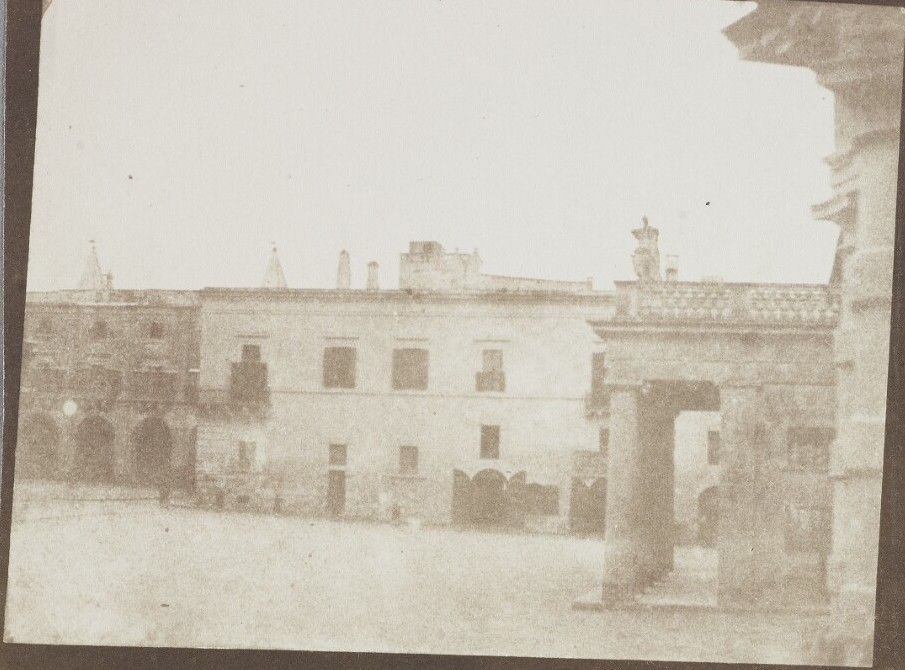
The building in 1846

English poet and writer Samuel Taylor Coleridge worked inside the building between 1804 and 1805. A plaque on the façade of the building was attached by Giovanni Bonello in the commemoration of Coleridge. It was converted into a hotel in the late 19th century, known as the Grand Hotel. At one point, part of the building also housed the second cinema to open in Malta, which was called the Grande Cinematografo or the Salinos Cinema. Since the early 20th century, the building has housed the Casino Maltese, a reputed gentlemen's club. The structure was extensively modified in 1914 by the architect Nicola Buhagiar.

In April 1921, Japanese Crown Prince (later Emperor) Hirohito was received at the Casino Maltese, while visiting Malta as part of a six-month tour of Europe. Hirohito presented a vase to the club, and this is still exhibited at the building.

The building was severely damaged by aerial bombardment in World War II. In 1942, the grand stairway was destroyed after a bomb fell in the building's courtyard, but it was later rebuilt. At this point the building was redesigned, with several modifications, by Francesco Sammut.

The building is scheduled as a Grade 1 national monument by the Malta Environment and Planning Authority.

== Architecture ==
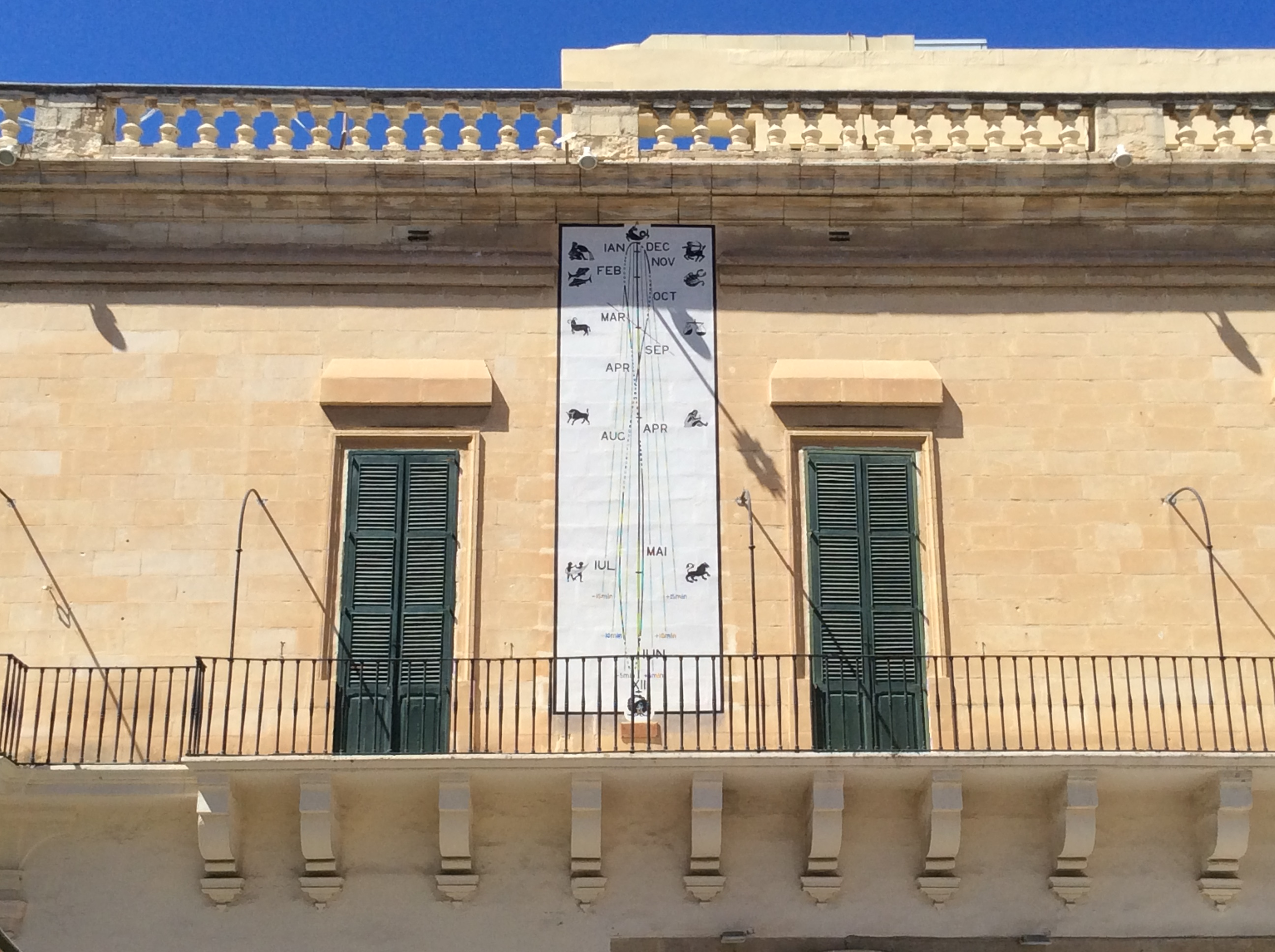
The façade of the Casa del Commun Tesoro, with the sundial/calendar

The Casa del Commun Tesoro is a large building with two stories. The façade is somewhat plain, and an open balcony runs along most of the first floor. The façade facing Republic Street contains a large sundial and calendar, which is unique in Malta. Its ground floor contains a number of shops, including Caffe Cordina. The interior of the building includes a decorated ceiling, a grand staircase and a central courtyard.
