= Giuseppe Valenti =

Italian sculptor

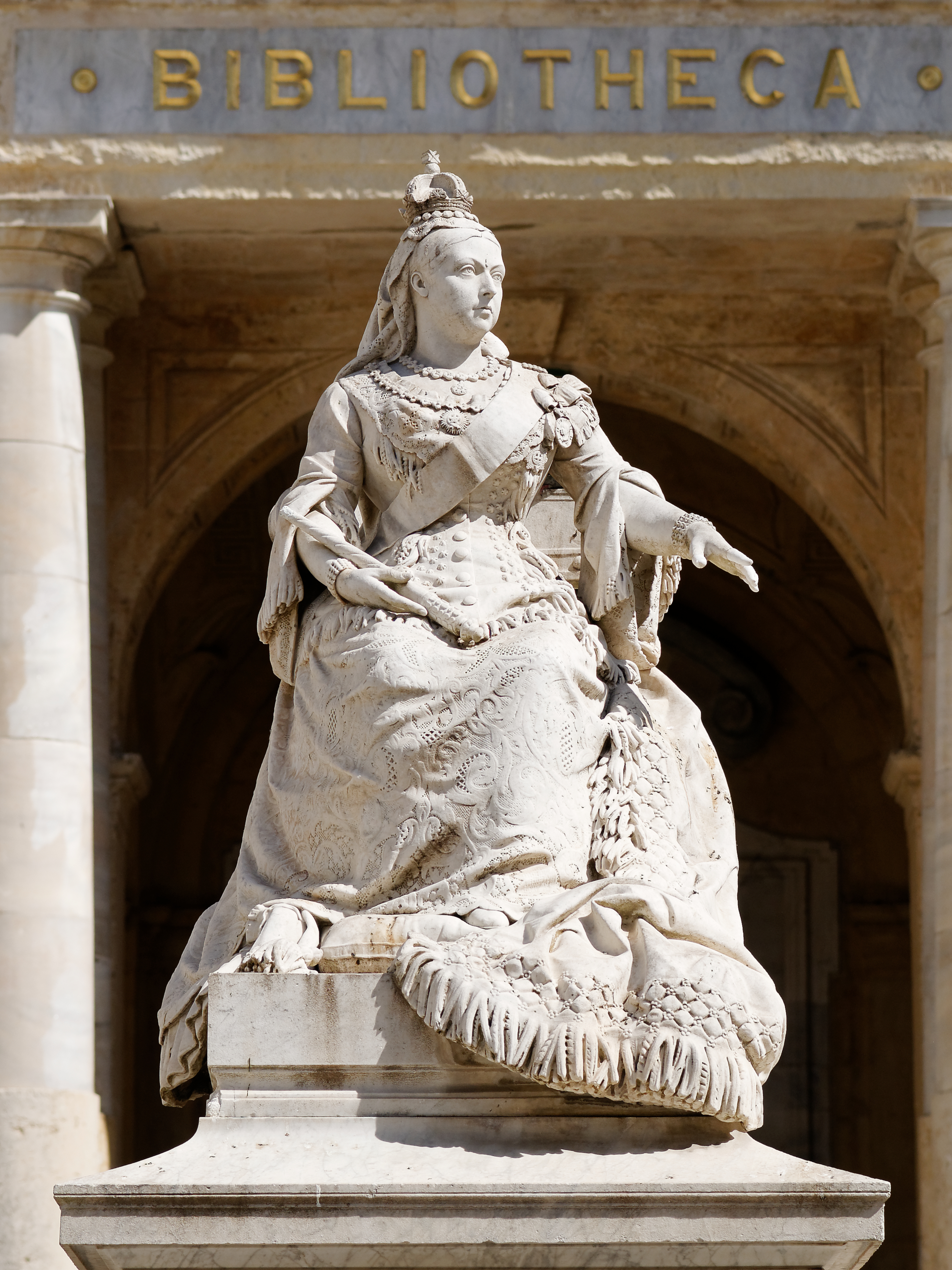
Statue of Queen Victoria in Valletta, Malta

Giuseppe Valenti was a Sicilian sculptor who was active in the late 19th century.

Valenti was born in Palermo, he was the son of Salvatore Valenti, who was also a sculptor and wood carver. His work includes a seated statue of Saint Publius at St Paul's Cathedral in Mdina, Malta (1885), a terracotta bust of Governor Lintorn Simmons at the Casino Notabile (1887), and a marble statue of Queen Victoria in Valletta (1891). The latter is one of the artist's best-known works. He also sculpted funerary monuments and various works for Palermo churches.

It has also been speculated that the sculpted stonework of the Casino Notabile's exterior might have been the work of Valenti.
