= Mark Camilleri =

Maltese writer (born 1988)

Mark Camilleri M.Q.R
- Born: 1988
- Education: University of Malta
- Organisations: Dar Camilleri; The Maltese Herald
- Political party: Partit Laburista (until 2019)
- Other political affiliations: Moviment Graffitti
- Writing career
- Occupations: Historian; writer; publisher; journalist
- Genres: nonfiction; politics; political satire; history
- Notable work: A Rent Seeker's Paradise (2021); Ġaħan fl-Aqwa Żmien (2022)

Mark Camilleri (born 1988) is a Maltese author, historian, publisher, and independent journalist. Camilleri served as chairman of Malta's National Book Council from 2013 to 2021. Following his dismissal, he became an outspoken critic of Malta's ruling Labour Party, particularly against former prime minister Joseph Muscat, and current prime minister, Robert Abela. In the 2010s, Camillieri advocated against censorship laws in Malta. He has written and published books about the history of Malta and novels, and established his own publishing house, Dar Camilleri. He founded a news website, The Maltese Herald, in 2024, where he publishes investigations and news.

== Early career ==
In his youth Camilleri was a member of Moviment Graffitti. During this time, he was arrested with another member for attempting to throw red paint at the USS O'Bannon American warship, which was temporarily berthed in Malta. As he was a minor at the time of the crime, his name was not published. He was conditionally discharged for involuntarily damaging police uniforms, and fined €100.

Camilleri studied at the University of Malta. As a student, he edited a student newspaper called Ir-Realtà. During his university years, in 2009, he published Alex Vella Gera's short story Li Tkisser Sewwi (trans. Fix What You Break) in Ir-Realtà. Vella Gera's short story is a first person male narrative about female objectification and sexual violence. The publication was promptly banned from the University of Malta, and Camilleri was indicted to court along with the author for publishing obscenities and pornography. This arrest took place during a time when censorship laws were being applied across the arts sector. After the arrest, he organized a pressure group called Front Against Censorship, which lobbied for the removal of censorship laws from the arts. Camilleri and Vella Gera were released from all charges by the Maltese courts. For his contributions to art and literature in Malta, Camilleri was awarded a Midalja għall-Qadi tar-Repubblika (M.Q.R.) in 2013 by Malta's President George Abela. Vella Gera was also offered the award but turned it down.

== National Book Council ==
In 2013, Camilleri was appointed Executive Chairman of Malta's National Book Council. During his tenure he introduced Malta's first Public Lending Rights scheme, began Malta's participation at the London Book Fair, and founded the Malta Book Fund.

Camilleri also pushed for the exportation of Maltese literature, describing Immanuel Mifsud and Walid Nabhan as two of the most representative contemporary Maltese authors around the world in an interview with journalist Ramona Depares.

After the 2019 Malta political crisis, Camilleri became very critical of the government owing to complications arising from his own position on Daphne Caruana Galizia's murder investigation. An example of this is evident in the cancellation of the National Book Prize Ceremony, which was due to be held at the Office of the Prime Minister in November. This followed a request for his resignation from his public service post after insulting senior government officials. He apologized, and he said that the request for resignation had been withdrawn after the apology.

His contract with the National Book Council was not renewed in 2021. He said this was due to political discrimination because of his criticism of the Labour administration. He criticised his successor and said that he was denied a lifetime achievement award. He said that the chairman, who is a novelist also named Mark Camilleri, discriminated against his publishing house, which the chairman denied. The Constitutional Court ruled in 2025 that Camilleri had been discriminated against by the new administration of the Book Council, specifically by refusing to review his book because of the political content of the book, but found that he had not been unfairly dismissed from his role.

== Publications ==
=== Books ===
His output as a historian includes the books A Materialist Revision of Maltese History 870-1919 (2016, SKS, ISBN 9789993217435) and A Materialist Revision of Maltese History 1919-1979 (2018, SKS, ISBN 9789993217565). In the first book, Camilleri said that the Superintendence of Cultural Heritage had deliberately concealed archaeological evidence to gloss over Malta's Islamic history, and he called for the publication of all archaeological items in its inventory. In 2020 he also called for relocation of a statue of Queen Victoria from the centre of Valletta.

In his book A Rent-Seeker's Paradise (2021, Dialekta, ISBN 9789918953516), Camilleri said that six Malta Government rebel members of parliament had asked Joseph Muscat to resign from Prime Minister and leader of the Labour Party during Malta's political crisis in December 2019.

Camilleri is a self-published author through his publishing house, Dar Camilleri, which he founded in 2021. Publications include his satirical novel Ġaħan fl-Aqwa Żmien (2022, ISBN 9789918953523), L-Antologija ta' Letteratura Mqarba (2022, ISBN 9789918953530), The Life and Times of Juan Bautista Azopardo (2023, ISBN 978-9918-9535-4-7), and the English-language translation The Anthology of Mischievous Maltese Literature (2024, ISBN 978-1-3999-5580-5).

Arts Council Malta awarded a €25,000 contract to Camillieri's publishing house to write a report about the culture industry in Malta. In May 2025, the Malta Entertainment Industry and Arts Association questioned and requested disclosure of the criteria for the award.

=== Journalism and press ===
In 2021, he published online chats between alleged Daphne Caruana Galizia murderer Yorgen Fenech and Maltese politician Edward Zammit Lewis. In 2023, he released chats between Fenech and Maltese politician Rosianne Cutajar. This led to the resignation of Cutajar from the Malta Government's parliamentary group, which also triggered her removal from the Social Affairs Committee of the Parliament of Malta. The Criminal Court charged Camilleri over the release of the chats involving Cutajar, interpreting this as contempt of court in the context of Fenech's ongoing judicial process. Camilleri asked the First Hall of the Civil Court to declare that his publication of the chats was in the public interest. The Constitutional Court dismissed his case in June 2025, ruling that his rights had not been breached. In September 2025, the Criminal Court found Camilleri guilty of contempt of court over the publication of chats between Fenech and Cutajar, and the court fined him €1000.

In April 2025, Camilleri was found guilty of defamation against blogger Simon Mercieca due to an article Camilleri published in 2023. The court ordered him to pay €2,500 in damages to Mercieca.

In November 2024, he launched The Maltese Herald, an independent news website. The Maltese Herald is registered as an electronic news outlet with the Department of Information of the Government of Malta. In 2026, businessman Simon Cusens sued Camilleri for libel related to an article he wrote in The Maltese Herald.

== See also ==
- Politics of Malta
- List of newspapers in Malta
