= Jesmond Grech =

Maltese teacher and writer

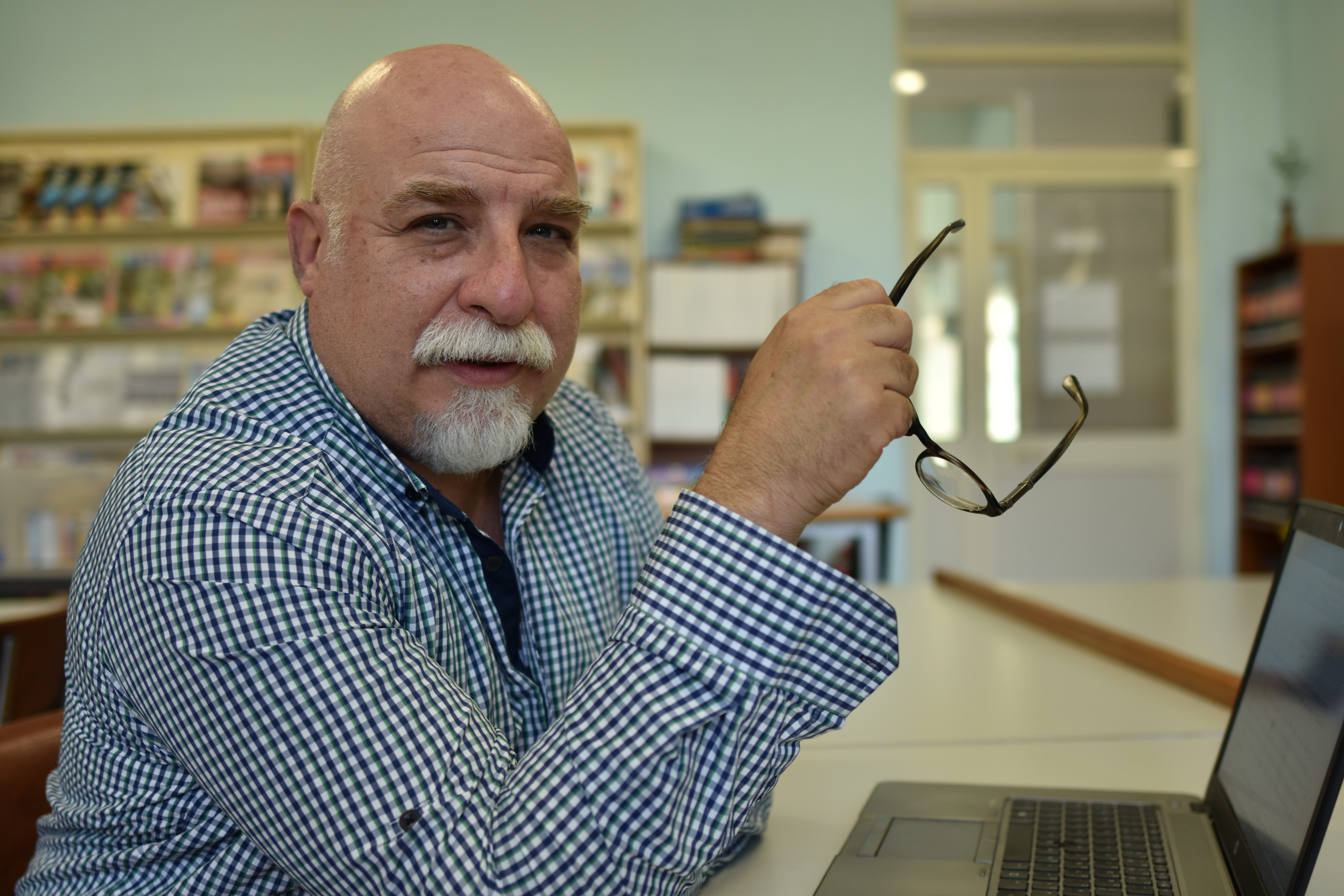
- Author of Contemporary Maltese Literature
- Born: Jesmond Grech; 14 September 1963 (age 63); Paola, Malta
- Occupations: Novelist; historian; writer; teacher
- Writing career
- Notable works: Bongi Wongi u l-Avventuri Tiegħu; Ġenerazzjoni Paceville; British Heritage in Malta; Nar Ġo Qalbna; 1565

Jesmond Grech (born 14 September 1963) is a Maltese novelist, historian, writer, and teacher. He was born at the Royal Navy Hospital Mtarfa in Malta, and spent his childhood and youth in Paola, Malta. He is married to Mary née Pace, with whom he has two children, Julian and Maria Cristina. He was educated at Paola Primary School, Mount Carmel College (Santa Venera, Malta), St. Paul's Missionary College (Malta) and the University of Malta (B.Ed., M.Ed.), and is History Head of Department at a Maltese state secondary school.

Grech is honorary member of St Andrew's Band Club, Luqa, Malta and is Honorary President of Siġġiewi Rowing Club. He lives in Siġġiewi with his family.

== Career ==
Over the past thirty years, Grech has published fifteen books across a variety of genres, from children's stories and novels to historiography. In 2008, his children's book Bongi Wongi u l-Avventuri Tiegħu (Bongi Wongi and his Adventures) was Malta's entry at the exhibition Tour d’Europe en 27 Livres d’Images that was held at the Bibliothèque nationale de France. The exhibition was inaugurated by Christine Albanel, the French Minister for Culture and Communication and Bruno Racine, the Chairman of the Bibliothèque nationale de France. The book, published by Klabb Kotba Maltin was illustrated by Marisa Attard, one of Malta's most prominent illustrators.

Grech's novel Ġenerazzjoni Paceville (Paceville Generation), first published by Klabb Kotba Maltin in 1999, started a trend for adolescent literature in the Maltese language, in which trend he was soon eagerly followed by other authors. Grech has also made contributions to television drama. Two of his novels Gideb u Mħabba and Mħabba mill-Ġdid have been adapted and produced by Hermann Bonaci Productions for Maltese television. In the 1980s he wrote and directed a satirical play based on Hans Christian Andersen’s The Princess and the Pea, in Maltese Sardinella u l-Piżella for the ATEATRU fringe theatre company.

He also wrote two radio plays, Bejn l-Ilma u In-Nar and Qatla f’Pentekoste, that were broadcast on Radio 101 (Malta).

His British Heritage in Malta, with an introduction by Sir Vincent Fean then British High Commissioner to Malta, is described as a 'cross between a history and a guidebook'.

His most recent publication is the biography of Eugenio Borg, a Maltese catechist, who was the first superior general of the Society of Christian Doctrine, now in the process of canonisation to Catholic sainthood. This book, Nar Go Qalbna (published by Librerija Preca), has been translated and published in Spanish (Fuego En Nuestros Corazones).

In 2021, Jesmond Grech was interviewed by Ardain Isma about the publication of his first crime novel set in Malta entitled 'A Simple Affair' in which he introduced the character of Inspector Sander Debono and his motley team at CID. This was followed by "Ghosts" and a novel about the Great Siege of Malta entitled 1565.
