= Maltese lace =

Type of guipure bobbin lace from Malta

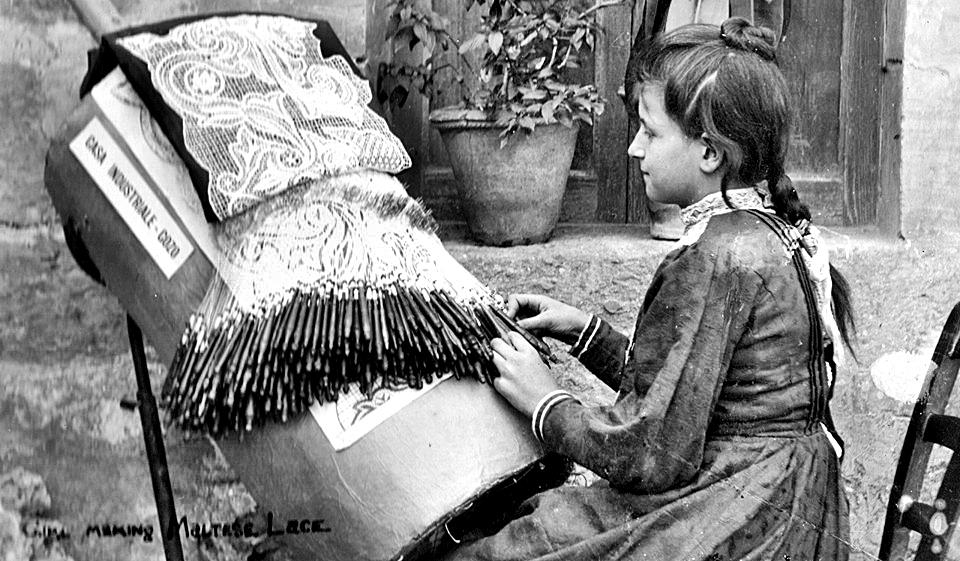
Mikiel Farrugia, Young lace-making student at Casa Industriale, Xagħra, Gozo, c. 1895

Maltese lace (Maltese: bizzilla) is a style of bobbin lace made in Malta. It is a guipure style of lace. It is worked as a continuous width on a tall, thin, upright lace pillow. Bigger pieces are made of two or more parts sewn together.

The Lace Pillow in Malta is known as Trajbu (pronounced as "try-boo"), while the Bobbins are called Ċombini (pronounced as "chom-beany"); this type of lace making is very popular on the island of Gozo.

== History ==
Lace made in Malta was originally needle lace, from the 16th to the 19th century, when the economic depression in the islands nearly led to the extinction of lacemaking there. But in the mid-1800s, Lady Hamilton Chichester sent lacemakers from Genoa to Malta. They used the old needle lace patterns and turned them into bobbin lace, which was quicker. It was not long after its introduction that the Maltese lace developed its own style from Genoese lace.

Maltese lace was shown at The Great Exhibition of 1851 and it became popular in Britain. The style was copied by lacemakers in the English Midlands, and it was one of the sources for Bedfordshire lace.

Lace is still made in Malta today. To ensure the survival of the craft, lace making is taught in Government trade schools for girls, while private bodies such as the Society of Arts, Manufactures and Commerce also hold special evening classes.

== Characteristics of Maltese lace ==
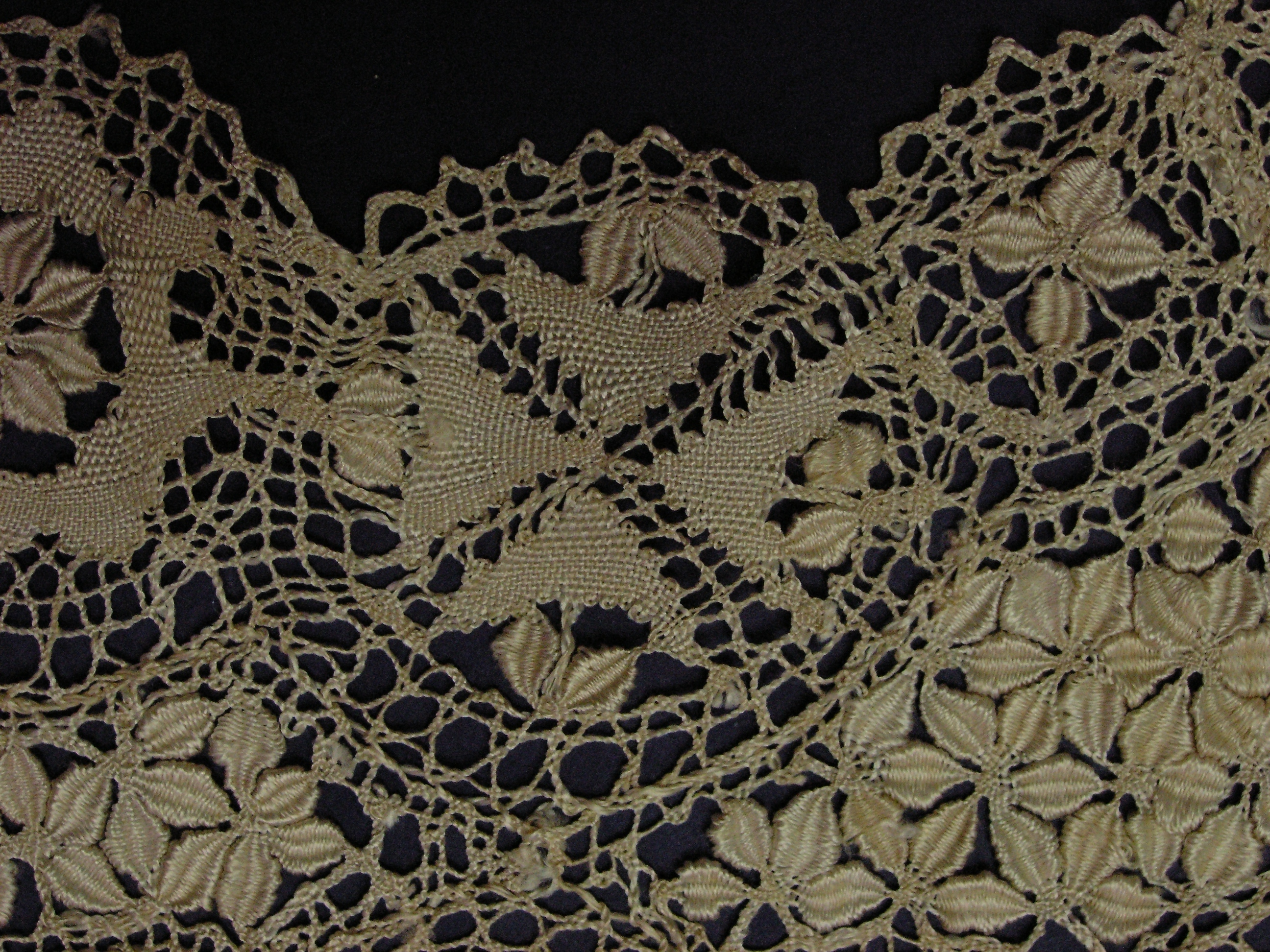
Collar (AM 1966.32-5)

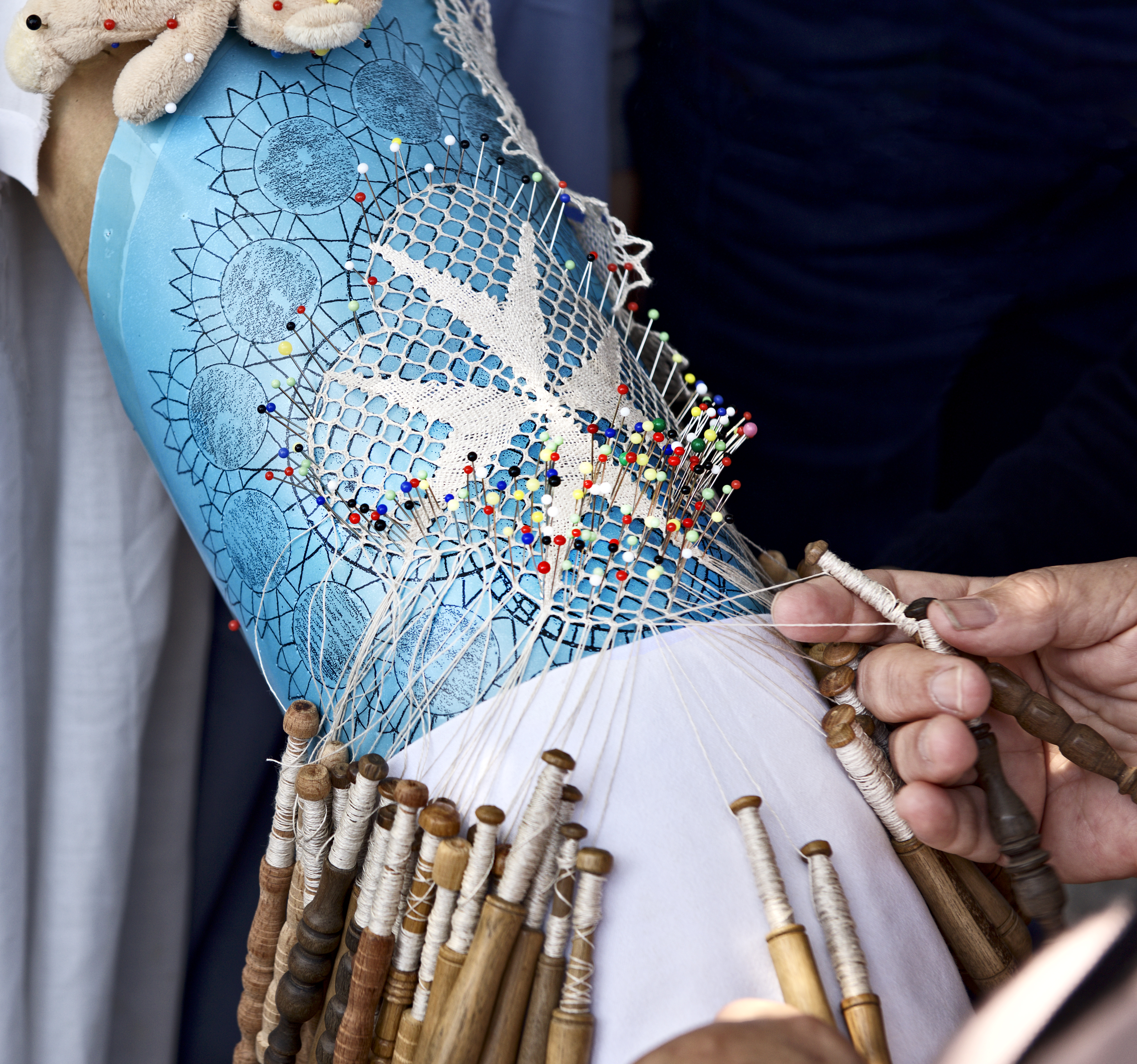
Bizzilla. Traditional Maltese Lace-making

Maltese lace usually has the following characteristics which are useful for identification:

- It is usually made from cream silk. Black silk was also used in the past. Occasionally linen thread was used.
- There is often the 8 pointed Maltese cross as part of the pattern, worked in whole or cloth stitch.
- The pattern may also have closely worked leaves known as “wheat ears” or “oats”. These are plump and rounded in shape, rather than the long narrow leaves of other types of bobbin lace.

== Gallery ==
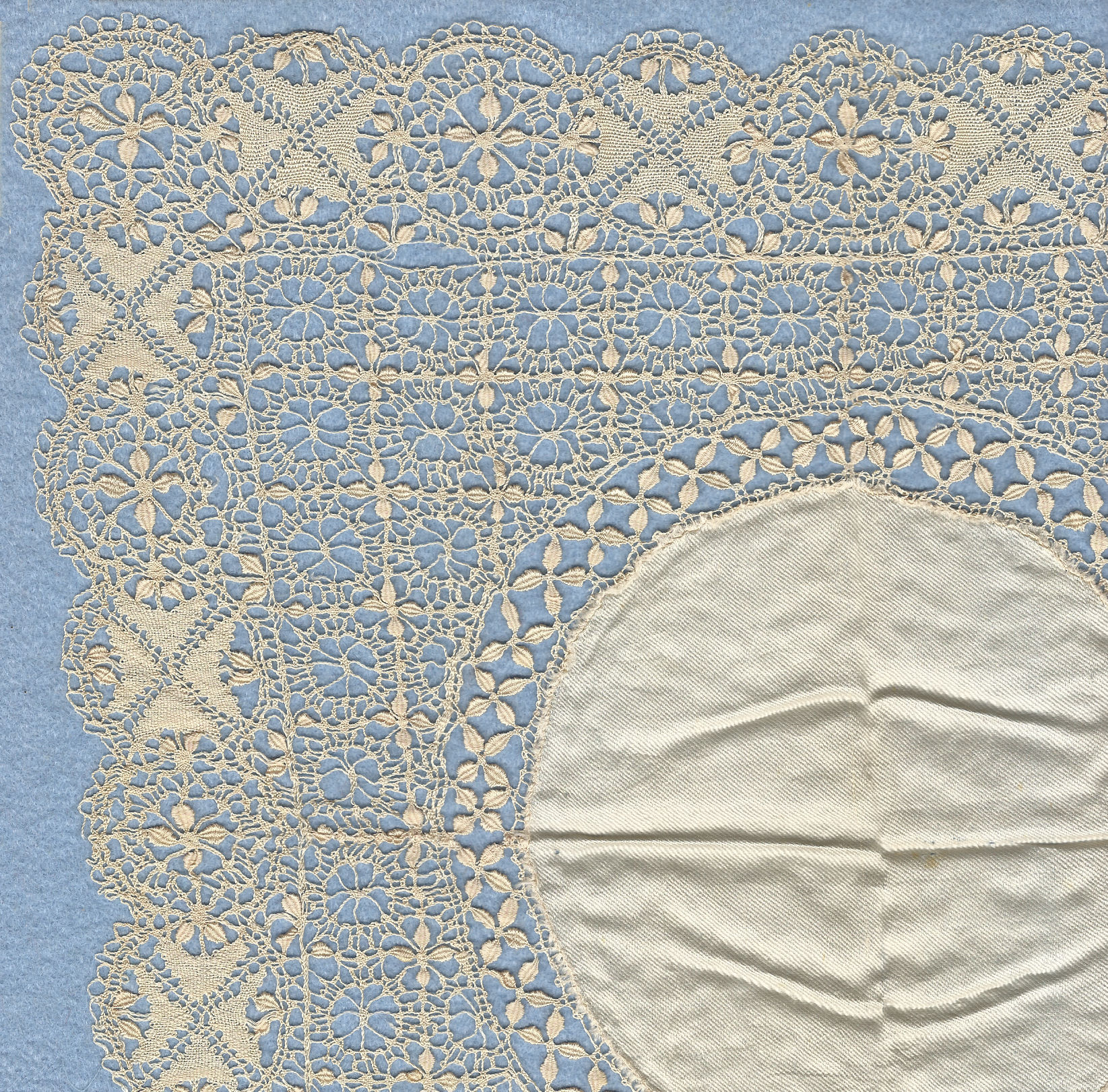
Maltese lace

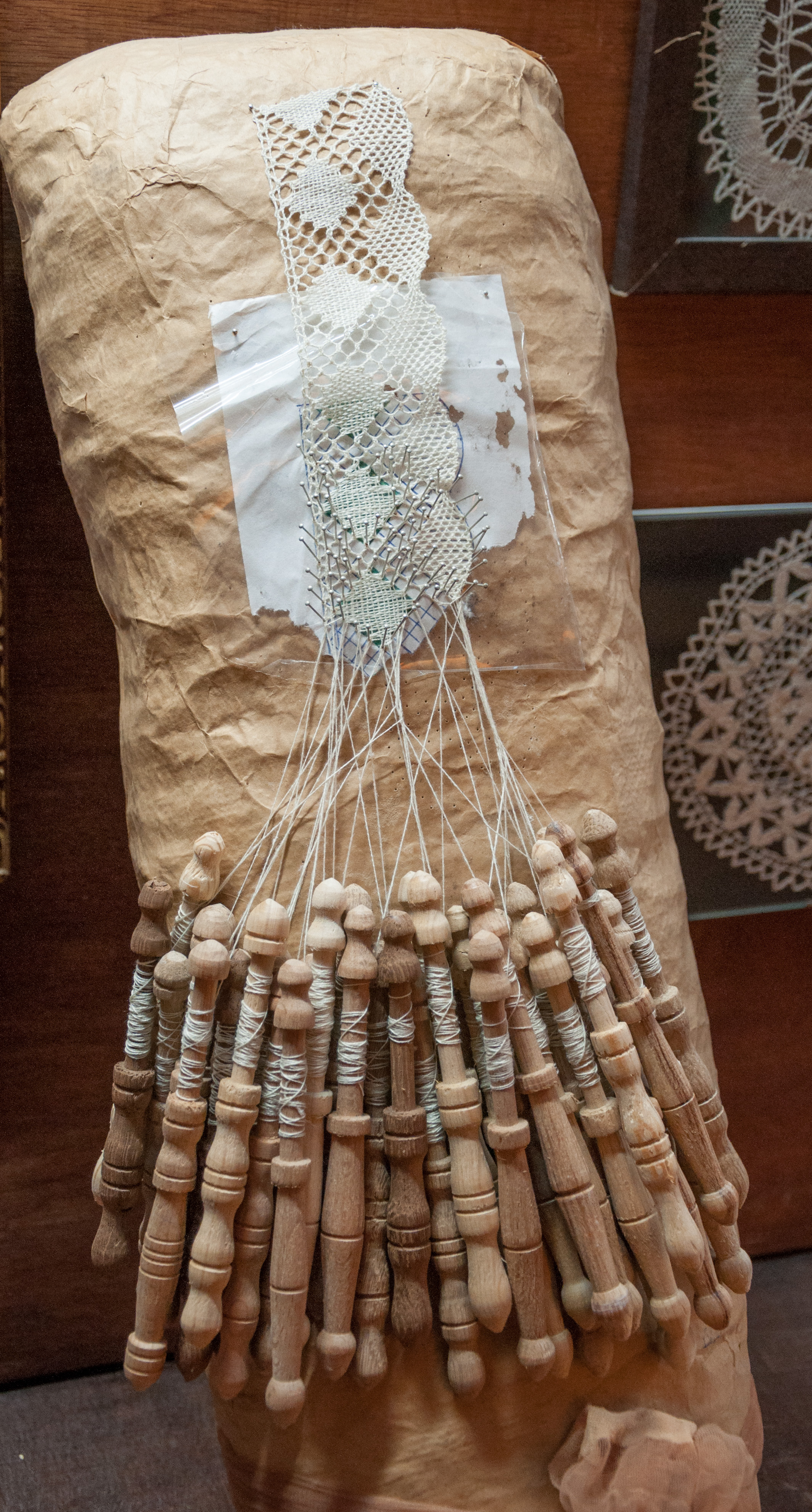
A Maltese lace pillow in use

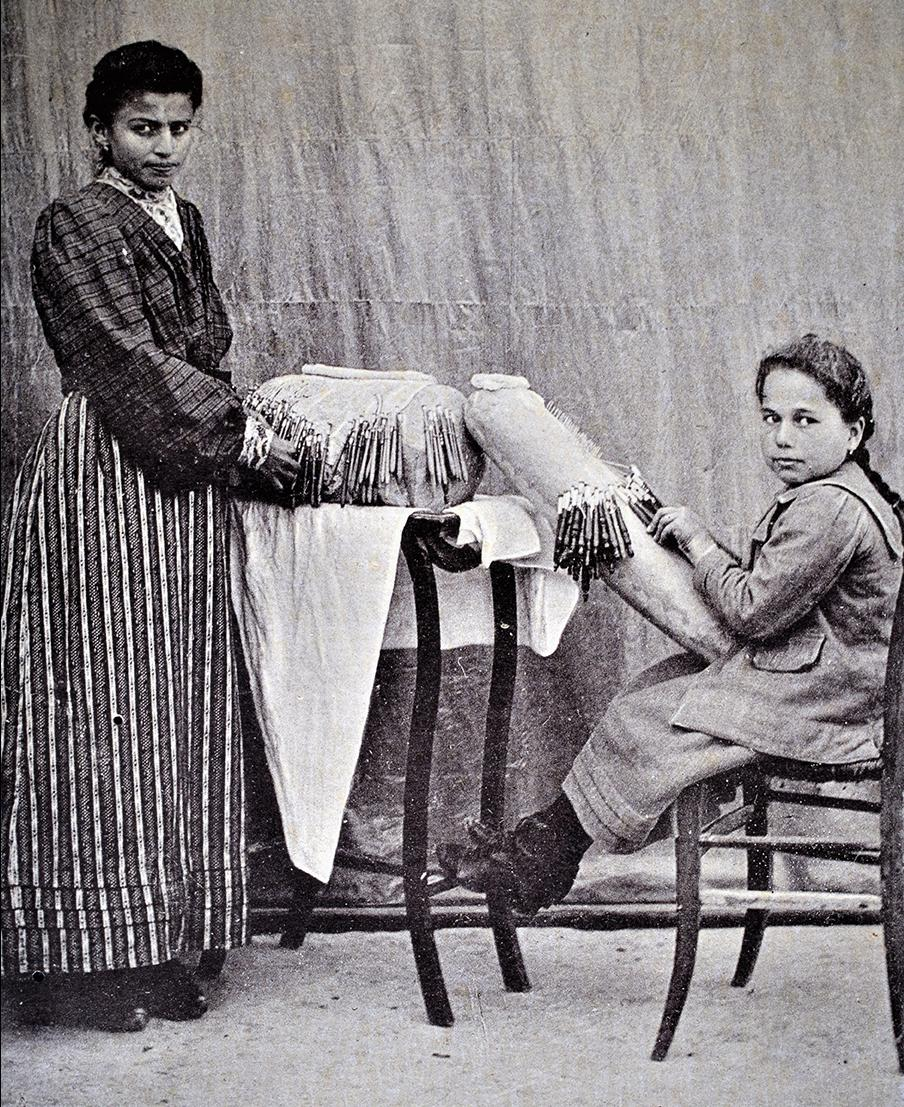
Young Gozitan lacemakers, 1910s
