= List of tallest buildings in Malta =

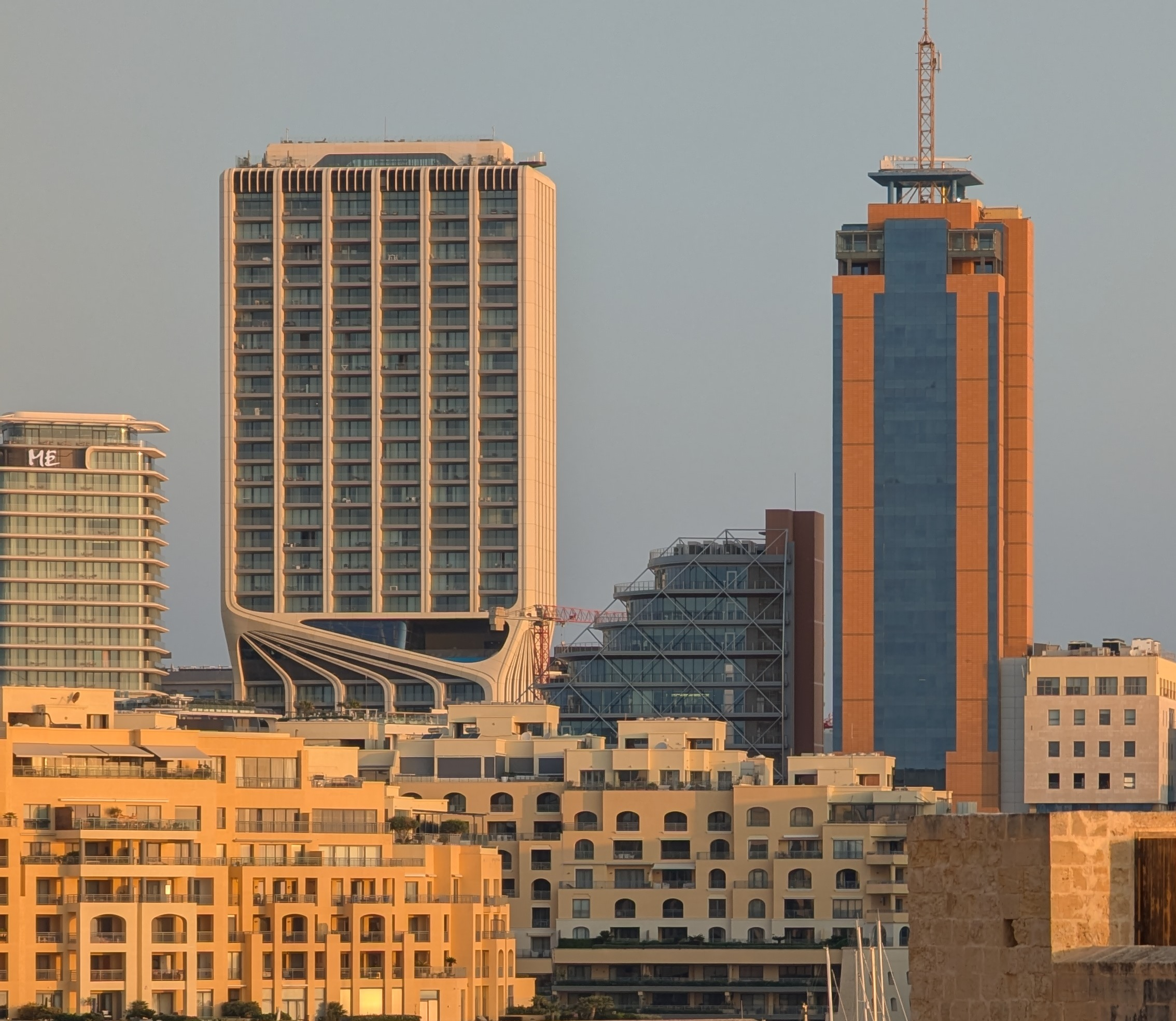
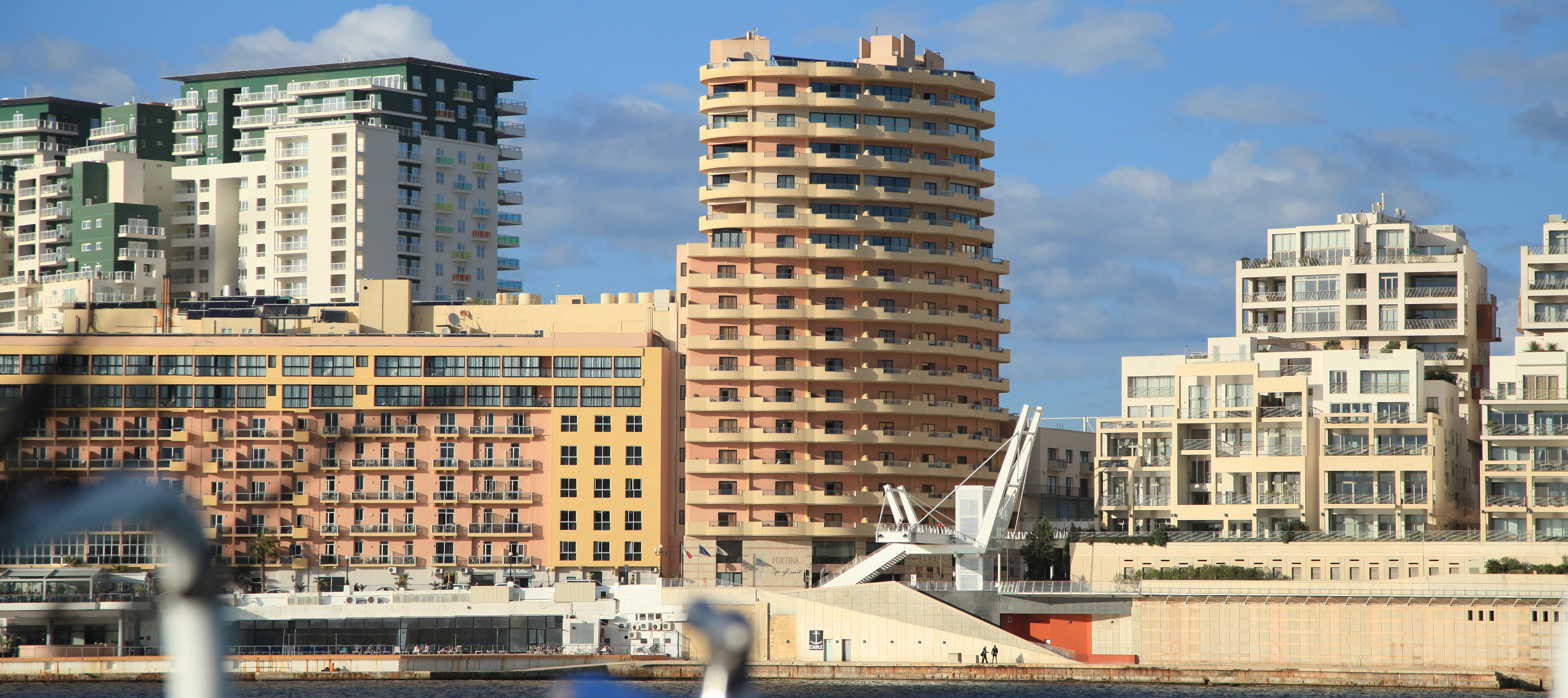
Left photo: Mercury Tower and Portomaso Business Tower.
Right photo: two buildings of Fort Cambridge Apartments (white-green colour) and the former Hotel Fortina (orange colour)

Since Malta's Independence in 1964, there has been a rapid increase in buildings all over the country. However, most of the urban areas are concentrated around the Grand Harbour and Marsamxett Harbour areas where some of the country's most busy places are situated; Sliema, Saint Julian's, Paceville, Msida, Gżira, Ta' Xbiex and Pietà.

As cars and road transport grew more and more popular in the country, the population started to spread out to farther areas and nowadays some other urban areas have developed; Saint Paul's Bay (including Qawra, Buġibba and Xemxija) and Mellieħa in the North, whilst having Marsaskala and the Malta Freeport area in the South of the country.

Some of the tall buildings in Malta, such as the Metropolis Plaza in Gżira, are still under construction. The highest structure ever built in Malta was the Delimara Power Station chimney, standing 150 metres (490 ft) above ground, until its demolition in 2017–18.

== Tallest buildings in Malta ==
The list includes highrise buildings (above 50 m (164 ft)) in Malta.

Rank	Name	Height m (ft)	Floors	Year	Use	Location
1	Mercury Tower	122 m (400 ft)	33	2023	Residential	Saint Julian's
2	Portomaso Business Tower	97.54 m (320 ft)	23	2000	Office	Saint Julian's
3	14 East	77 m (253 ft)	21	2019	Residential	Gżira
4	Fort Cambridge Apartments South	72.94 m (239 ft)	20	2012	Residential	Sliema
5	Fort Cambridge Apartments North	69.29 m (227 ft)	19	2012	Residential	Sliema
6	St Tower	66 m (216 ft)	17	2024	Office	Ta'Xbiex
7	Barceló Fortina Malta	62 m (203 ft)	17	2023	Hotel	Sliema
8	Pendergardens Tower	59 m (194 ft)	16	2019	Residential/Offices	Saint Julian's
9	Mercury Towers Tower 2	60 m (197 ft)	20	2023	Hotel	Saint Julian's
10	Q4 Tower	57 m (187 ft)	19	2023	Office	Imriehel, Birkirkara
11	InterContinental Malta; 35°55′25.8″N 14°29′17.5″E	55.51 m (182 ft)	15	2003	Hotel	Saint Julian's
12	The Preluna Hotel and Towers; 35°54′48.0″N 14°30′22.9″E	51.06 m (168 ft)	14	1969/1990	Hotel	Sliema
13	Q1 Tigne Point	51 m (167 ft)	14	2018	Residential	Sliema
14	Q2 Tigne Point	51 m (167 ft)	14	2018	Residential	Sliema

=== Churches ===
The list includes churches (above 50 m (164 ft)) in Malta.

Rank	Name	Image	Height m (ft)	Floors	Year	Location
1	Rotunda of Xewkija; 36°1′54.2″N 14°15′40″E		75 m (246 ft)		1973	Xewkija
2	Basilica of Our Lady of Mount Carmel; 35°54′00.7″N 14°30′44.3″E		73.17 m (240 ft)		1958	Valletta
3	St Paul's Pro-Cathedral; 35°54′1.89″N 14°30′41.96″E		63 m (207 ft)		1844	Valletta

== Buildings planned or under construction ==
Rank	Name	Image	Height m (ft)	Floors	Status	Use	Location
1	PX Tower		120 m (394 ft)	33	Planned [Approved]	Mixed-Use	St. Julian's
2	Metropolis Plaza Tower 1; 35°54′02.6″N 14°29′30.4″E		106 m (348 ft)	33	Planned/shelved? [Approved]	Residential	Gżira
3	Townsquare Tower		90 m (295 ft)	27	Under Construction	Residential	Sliema
4	Metropolis Plaza Tower 2; 35°54′02.6″N 14°29′30.4″E		87 m (285 ft)	27	Planned/shelved? [Approved]	Residential	Gżira
5	Metropolis Plaza Tower 3; 35°54′02.6″N 14°29′30.4″E		56 m (184 ft)	13	Planned/shelved [Approved]	Residential	Gżira
	db City Centre Tower 1		?	25	Under construction	Residential	Pembroke
	db City Centre Tower 2		?	23	Under construction	Residential	Pembroke
