= Joseph Portelli =

Maltese entrepreneur

Joseph Portelli (born 21 May 1977 in Canada) is a Maltese entrepreneur and real estate developer.

== Biography ==
Portelli was born in Canada from a family from Nadur, Gozo. He started his career as a small-time sensar in his village.

=== During the Nationalist governments ===
==== Downtown Hotel, Victoria ====
His first project was the Downtown Hotel in Victoria, Gozo, which he developed together with Raymond Bajada's family company, car dealers from Xewkija. In March 2001 Portelli and Bajana aimed at developing a public square, terraced houses, entertainment centre and youth hostel spread over 8,700 square metres. Yet, their permit was denied. One year later, in October 2002, they got a permit for a hotel and shopping area. Yet, once built, the hotel could not deliver profits. On 3 June 2008, three months after the 2008 Maltese general election won by the PN by just over 1,000 votes, Portelli sought to partly change use of the complex from shopping outlet to offices. The PN later leased two floors of the hotel as office space, with the most expensive contract for the Gozo Ministry under the tenure of Giovanna Debono, for €62,900 per year. The hotel was also later used to host patients from the Gozo General Hospital during the COVID-19 pandemic. Until April 2022 it served as a temporary home, leased to the government by Portelli for some €1 million a year.

==== Ħas-Sagħtrija ====
In late 2008, Portelli aimed at developing 15 tumoli of untouched land in the Ħas-Sagħtrija area of Żebbuġ, Gozo into 75 luxury apartments. Under Menfi Ltd, Portelli cajoled into the project other developers including hotelier and restauranter Adrian Buttigieg, Paul Sultana, former MP Franco Mercieca, Alfred and Jonathan Mangion (AM Group) and the owners of St James Hospital, while contracting architect Ray Demicoli. Yet, Menfi Lts' debts were reported to amount to some €3 million. His only other relevant development in those years was a group of farmhouses in Qala, known as Villaġġ San Ġużepp. The Sagħtrija project cemented POrtelli's reputation as a bridge-builder, and show-cased his capacity to nurture relations between the political and industrial elite in Malta.

=== During the Labour governments ===
==== Relations with Dalli and Schembri ====
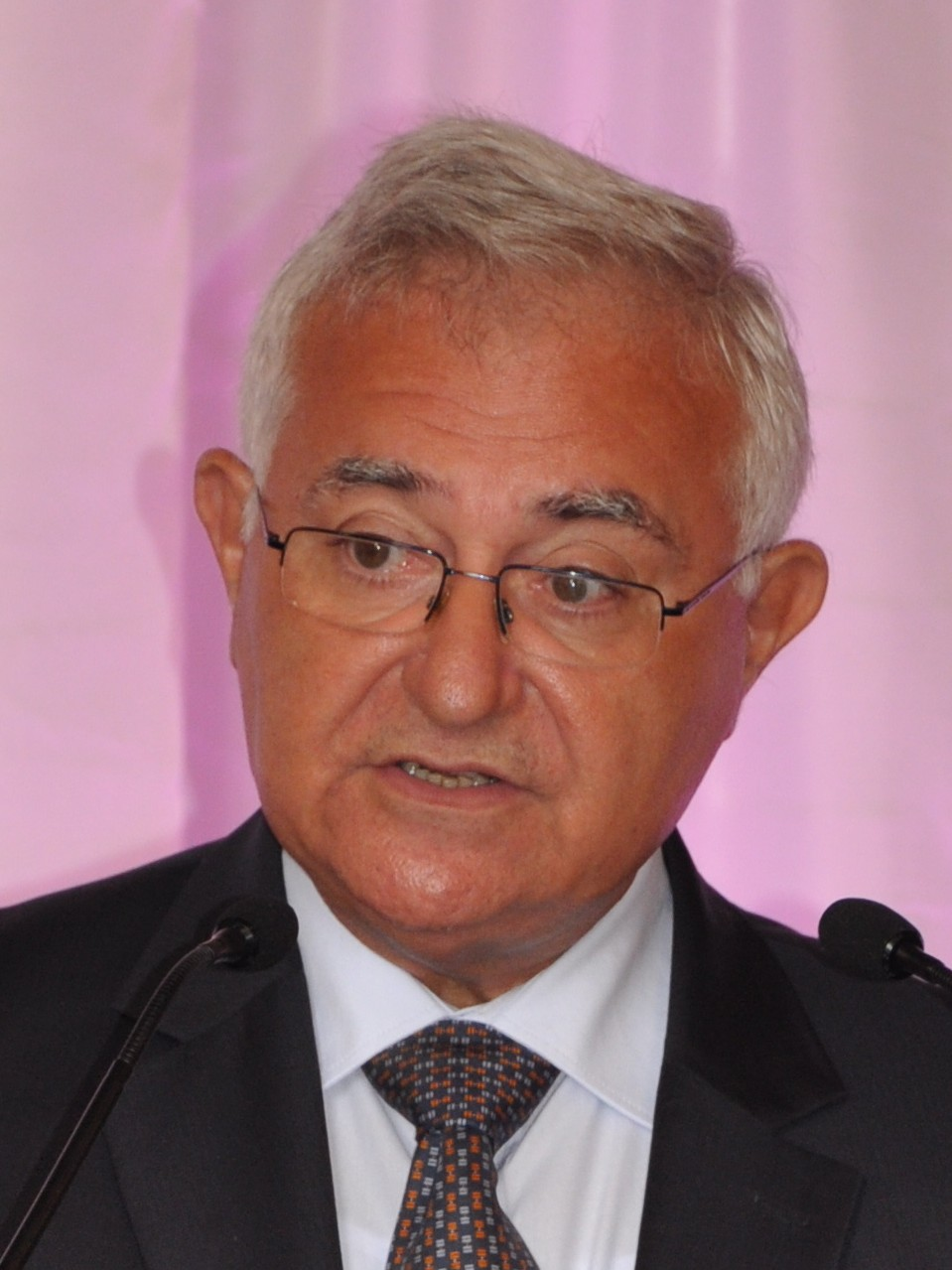
Maltese politician John Dalli

Following the 2013 Maltese general election and the arrival to power of Joseph Muscat, Portelli worked on his relationship with turncoat political heavyweight John Dalli (later facing criminal charges for bribery). Portelli and Dalli even registered companies at the same address, and Dalli's daughter Claire Gauci Borda even served as J Portelli Projects’ CFO, despite also facing criminal charges.

Portelli's next door was Muscat's chief of staff Keith Schembri, considered the prime minister's liaison with the business world. Portelli admitted regularly meeting politicians to "speed up" permit approvals, in an interview with the Times of Malta.

It is alleged that several developers used Portelli as a front not to get their names sullen - notably Gozitan entrepreneur Mark Agius and his Ta' Dirjanu family. There are also suspects that Portelli's projects were funded among others by Schembri and Yorgen Fenech, the Tumas Group businessman charged with the assassination of Daphne Caruana Galizia. Portelli was mentioned in chats between Yorgen Fenech and then-PA CEO Johann Buttigieg, stating that Portelli owed Fenech "500"; Fenech had asked Buttigieg to identify developments by Portelli that he could take over as a settlement, with Buttigieg suggesting that he "take the one in Qormi". Portelli regularly refused to indicate of his net worth, claiming that he reinvests all the profits.

==== Mercury Tower ====
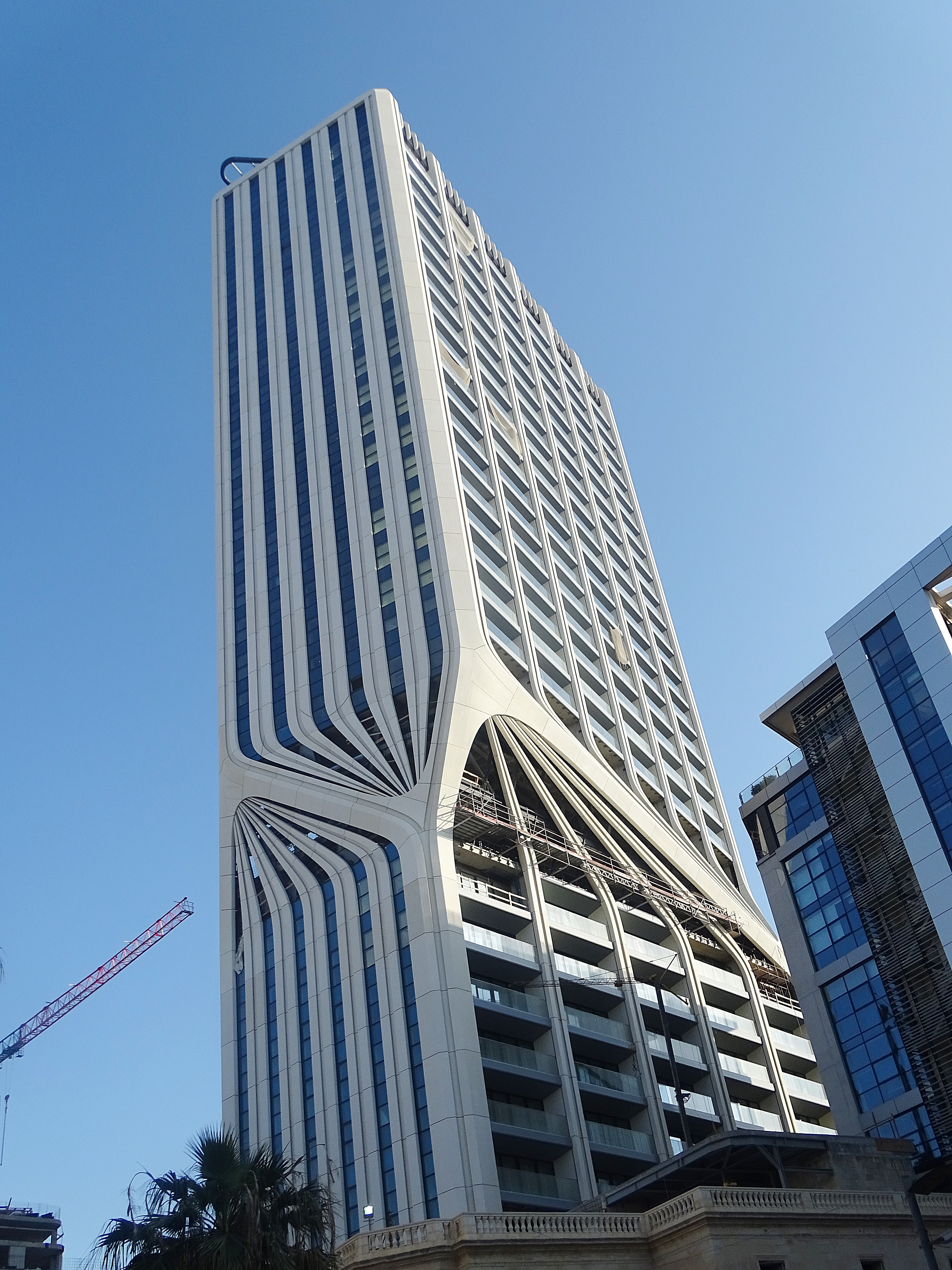
Mercury Tower in St. Julian's

Portelli's main project with the new Labour government was the massive development at the Forum Hotel site. In July 2017, Portelli submitted plans for the Mercury Tower. This was originally meant to be limited to 15 floors and to be used for offices, shops, and top-floor apartments and penthouses, as part of the €24 million 2005 concession. Yet, in 2012 the Planning Authority approved extensions of the two towers up to 19 and 18 floors. By the time of Portelli's project, they have grown to 40 and 25 floors. As a "compromise", Portelli developed a single 31-storey building, while retaining a permit for a second 23-floor towers, approved in 2020. The project was met with concerns, notably since it was disclosed that the UK consultancy Mott MacDonald, which had originally drafted the public master plan for Paceville, also worked on engineering reports for the Mercury House project.

The financial sustainability of the Mercury Tower also remains in doubt, with over €70 million plus interest to pay back to bondholders. The completion timeframes also faced delays.

==== Other development projects ====
Portelli has since submitted some of the most controversial building applications on the islands. Portelli also started selling apartments on plan at the Jerma Palace Hotel site, even before submitting any development application. Environmental activists claim that the Planning Authority routinely approves any project by Portelli, even against policies, alleging corruption. Portelli also makes use of frontmen to field applications, including associates like Daniel Refalo, Mark Agius, Marlon Mercieca and Clifton Cassar, and even his daughter Chloe Portelli. One of Portelli's architects, Maria Schembri Grima, was appointed as chair of the Building and Construction Agency in April 2021.

==== Road business ====
Portelli expanded into the hospitality business via the Quaint Boutique Hotels. He has also got deeply involved into the roads sector via the Excel Sis, together with Mark Agius Ta’ Dirjanu, Daniel Refalo and a Turkish company. At some point, PL Councillor Kurt Buttigieg and arms dealer James Fenech were also registered shareholders. Excel Sis was founded right as the government announced a €700 million investment in roads, and ratcheted up millions in public tenders. Yet, a €55 million government contract was rescinded after it was disclosed that a cheaper competitor had been disqualified. Excel Investments Holdings, linked to Excel Sis, is behind a controversial development project by the Sannat cliffs, approved despite strong opposition.

== Sport sponsorship ==
To cleanse his own reputation, Portelli invested heavily in Malta's sport sector. Maltese sociologists have interpreted such sponsorships as an effort to "buy legitimacy" and sympathy, gain a foothold into local traditional institutions (the sport team, the band club, the village festa), and make it harder for communities to mobilise against development projects.

By September 2022, J Portelli Projects was the main sponsor of at least seven sports teams, one boċċi competition and three band clubs in Malta and Gozo, outspending any other real-estate company. These include the Bormla Regatta Club, Ħamrun Spartans FC, the University of Malta futsal team, St. Julian's waterpolo club; and Nadur Youngsters FC, Qala Saints FC, and Żebbuġ Rovers FC in Gozo.

In 2021, Portelli also became the main sponsor of Bormla's regatta club - according to Malta Today, eyeing the nearby former Rialto Cinema, owned by the Labour Party.

=== Nadur Youngsters ===
Portelli had already twice presided the Nadur Youngsters teams, in 2002 - 2004 and 2017 - 2020. The white-washing led to his face being printed on flags for religious feasts. His young son Tristen Portelli later replaced him as Nadur FC president.

In April 2022, Portelli - the president of Ħamrun Spartans - was registered as a player for the final match of the GFA Division One season, which Nadur Youngsters won. Portelli entered the field at 79' and went on to score a goal on penalty.

=== Ħamrun Spartans presidency ===
In the summer of 2020 Portelli went on to preside one of Malta's prominent football clubs, Ħamrun Spartans.

Portelli invested heavily into the Ħamrun Spartans, while flouting COVID-19 regulations. This allowed him to ingratiate himself to the population of a 10,000+ town which is key for either party to win elections. Ħamrun-born infrastructure minister Aaron Farrugia and former prime minister Joseph Muscat both boasted pictures with Portelli at the Ħamrun Festa.

Ħamrun Spartans won the Maltese Premier League in 2020/21 and became the first local team to reach the play-off round of a UEFA club competition. In August 2022, Ħamrun Spartans were the first Maltese team to ever take part in the play-off of the UEFA Europa Conference League, eliminating Levski Sofia in the third qualifying round. Upon return of the players to Malta, supporters chanted Portelli's name. He also got a club song in his honour, including a remix of Inti Djamant (You are a diamond). The Spartans went on to win the Maltese league in 2023, 2024 and 2025, also taking part in UEFA competition play-offs.

== Folklore sponsorship ==
Portelli is also a patron of village festas in Ħamrun and Żabbar in Malta and Nadur in Gozo. Portelli is honorary president of the Ħamrun band club Għaqda tal-Mużika San Gejtanu. In Nadur, Portelli' face was used to portray St John the Evangelist on a banner for the feast of St Peter and St Paul. In Zabbar, J.P Projects flags were flown in the Saturday morning "blue" march for the band club Soċjetà Filarmonica Maria Mater Gratiæ.
