= Peter Heywood (artist) =

Peter Heywood (born 1944) is a British artist and former teacher. During his art career beginning in the 1960s, he has lived and worked in the United Kingdom, South Africa, Malta, and the United States.

== Early life and career ==
Peter Heywood was born in 1944 in Yorkshire. He attended Ossett Grammar School in Ossett in the 1950s, along with his identical twin brother Donald and their older brother, Alan. Following his BSc degree, Heywood taught maths and physics for 30 years. He was voted Britain's Best teacher in 1995 in a national newspaper search. He devoted much of his free time to painting, sometimes alongside his brother Donald, an artist trained at the Leicester College of Art.

Heywood's work began to be exhibited from the late 1960s. Some of his painting were displayed in the Spring Exhibition in Paris, and at a number of galleries in the UK. After a successful solo exhibition at the Aberbach Fine Gallery in Savile Row, London, he left teaching and became a full-time artist. For the next few years he travelled widely and lived in South Africa, where he created a series of landscapes. He had exhibitions in Johannesburg at the Cheri de Villiers Gallery and in Cape Town at the Everard Read Gallery and the Cape Gallery.

== Later career ==
In 2002, Peter and Donald bought an apartment in Malta overlooking the Port of Valletta, over a small inlet on the east coast known as the Grand Harbour. Heywood's Maltese scenes were exhibited locally at a solo exhibition at the Caraffa Stores, Vittoriosa. Further exhibitions were held at the Casino Maltese, and in Portomaso, adjacent to St Julien's Bay. Through the sale of his paintings he also raised funds for several Maltese charities.

From 2011, Heywood began spending more time in the United States, where he spent most of the following decade. He completed a series of paintings of famous historic landmarks of New York, seen as reflections through neighbouring buildings. His first exhibition in the U.S. took place two years after he moved there, at the Alan Barnes Fine Art Gallery in Santa Fe, New Mexico, and he exhibited at the Q Street gallery in Washington D.C. in November 2013. Further U.S. shows included the Leila Heller Gallery in New York in August 2014, the Thorn Tree Art Project in New York City in November 2017, and the 237 Hudson Street Gallery in 2019. At the Hudson exhibition, AT&T purchased a large canvas for their new New York headquarters. After the exhibition, Heywood began a new series exploring the shape and movement of dance and dancers, working towards a proposed show in 2020 to raise money for the New York City Ballet, which eventually did not take place because of the COVID pandemic.

In March 2024 Heywood traveled to Noto, Sicily, to set up and open his largest exhibition: "From New York to Noto", whose 57 paintings included Heywood's Reflections series and his ballet and figure explorations. He was invited by Noto's Mayor Corrado Figura, and the opening night reception was co-hosted by novelist Maria Giovanni Mirado.

== Style and influences ==
Heywood produced 'representational' paintings of creation and landscape in his early career, especially scenes from Yorkshire and the Pennines. His works on reflected buildings in New York are visual explorations of light passing through high sheet of glass, achieved by layering and toning of colour. Some have suggested Heywood is influenced by U.S. abstract expressionists such as Mark Rothko, Willem de Kooning, Jackson Pollock and the Australian artist Fred Williamson.
