= Bay Street (entertainment complex) =

Coordinates: 35.9244°N 14.4875°E

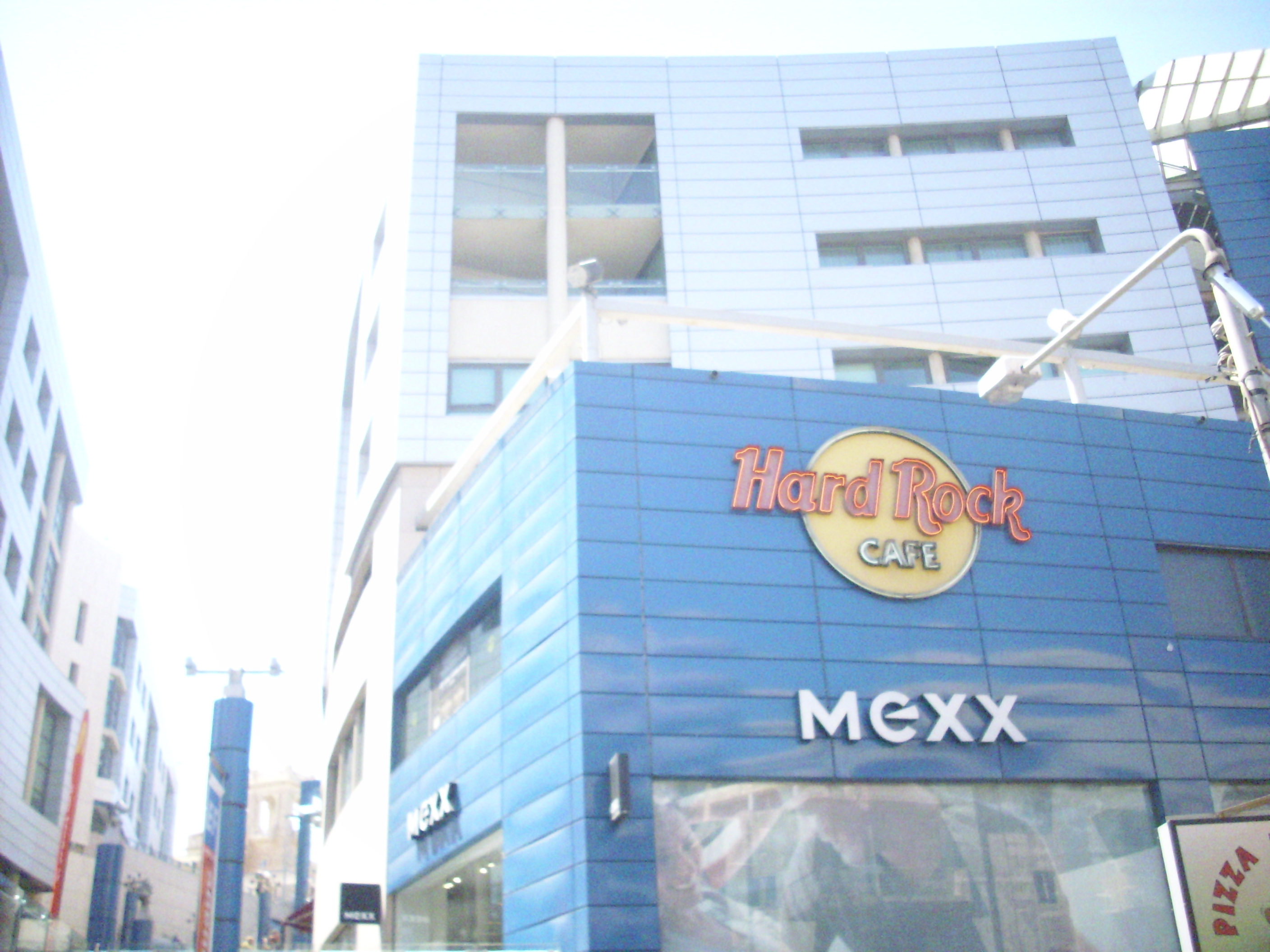
Bay Street

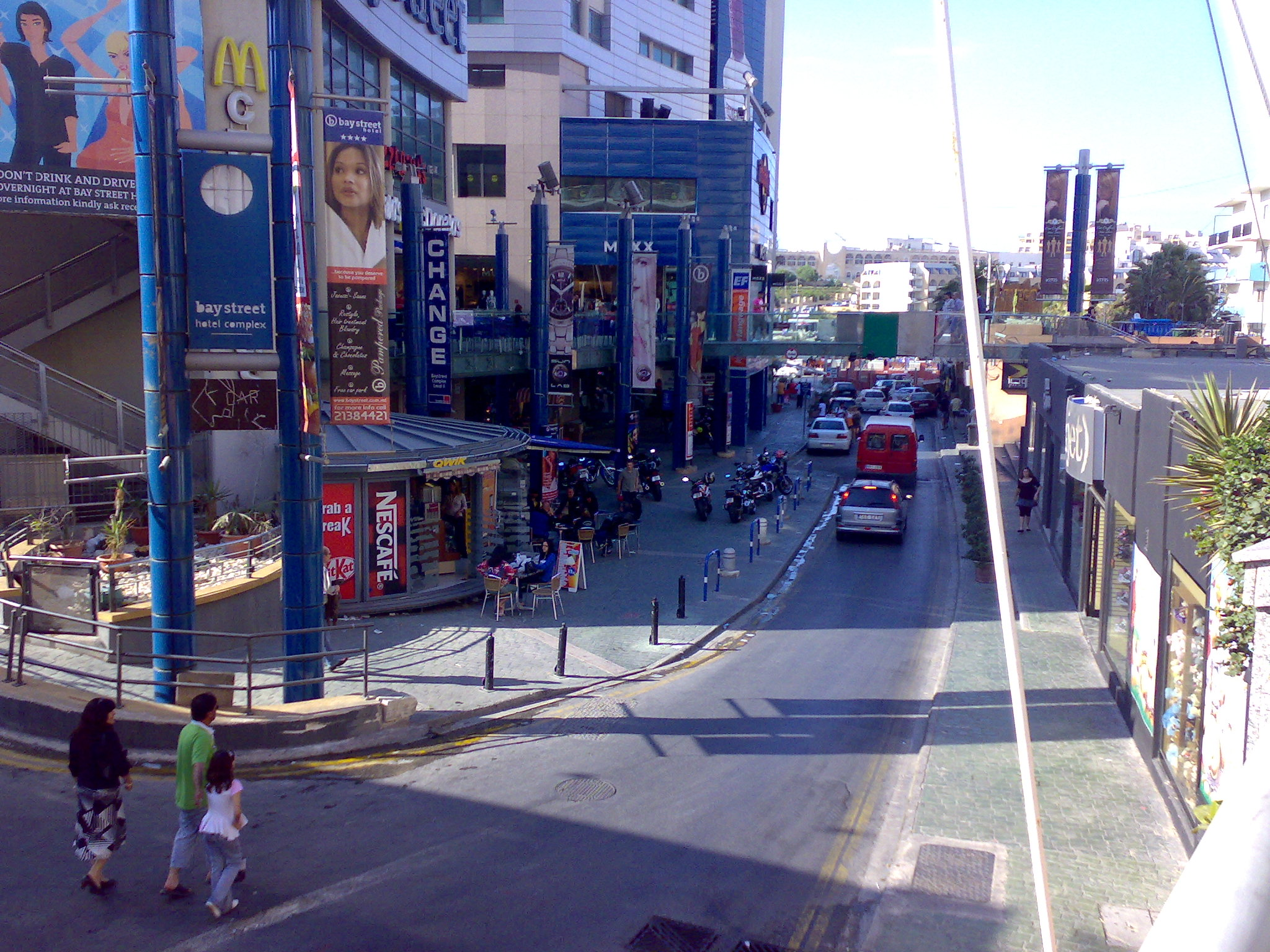
Triq Santu Wistin with Bay Street on the left

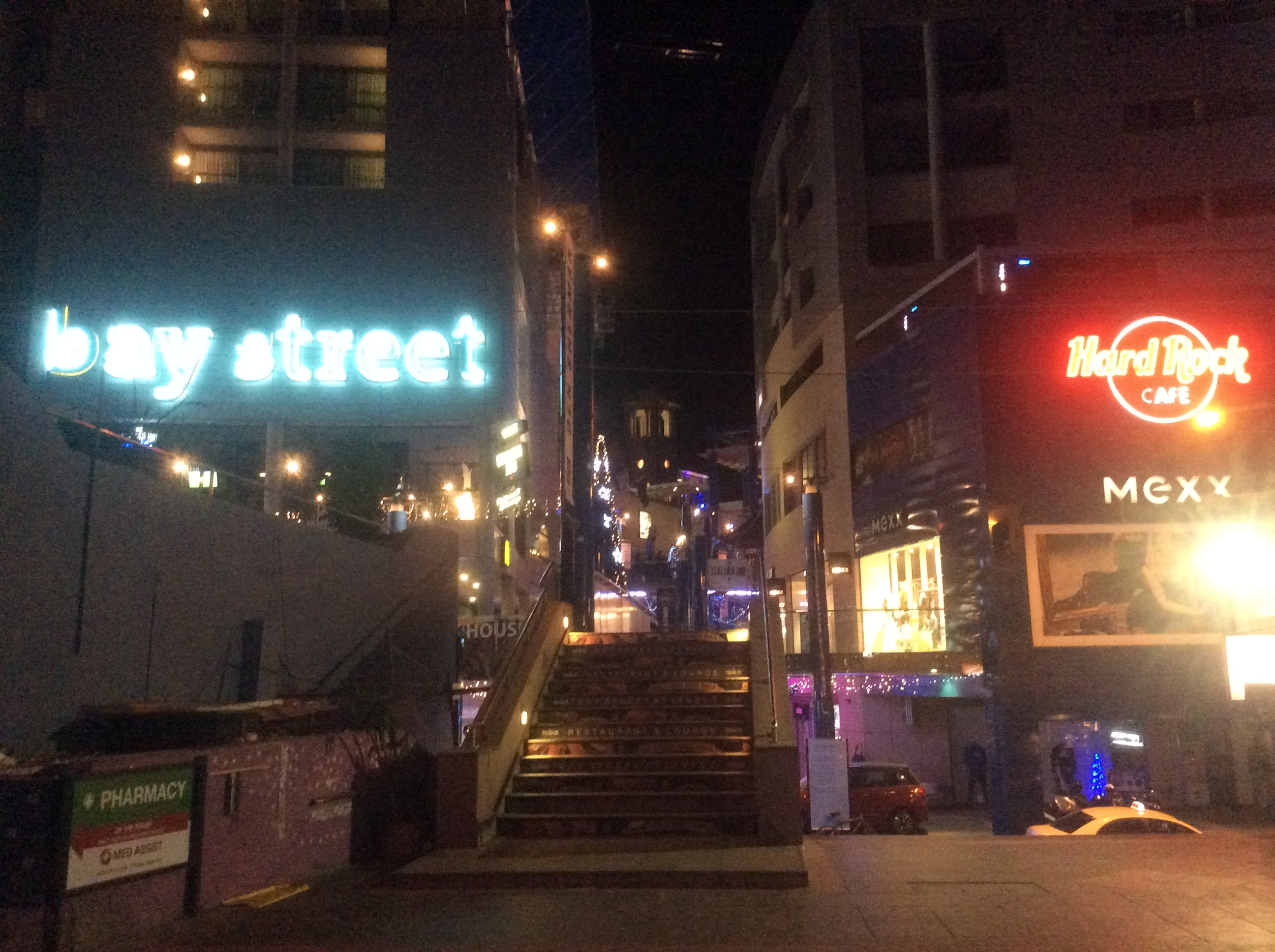
Bay Street at night

Bay Street is a hotel, commercial, and entertainment complex in St. Julian's, Malta.

Bay Street was constructed on November 25, 2000, as part of a Lm 30 million investment for the Paceville area. It incorporates the largest shopping complex on the island, which is open seven days a week from 10am-10pm. Bay Street lies adjacent to St. Julian's and Paceville, Malta's main nightlife area, and overlooks St. George's Bay.

The complex incorporates approximately 65 retail outlets. Tenants include The Model Shop, Malta's largest toy retailer. including international brand-name shops, cafes, restaurants, bars, a casino, a hotel, an arcade, an artisan centre and a children's ball park. The complex also includes a number of one-bedroom apartments. Bay Street was constructed by the local company Bronville, and its aspect was designed by British firm BDG McCol (who also designed the Millennium Dome in London). The complex cost Lm 22 million, and employs approximately 500 people, most of them foreigners.

In the past Bay Street had an education-themed attraction, the Discovery Centre. Its original purpose was to organise interactive science exhibitions every three months. The Centre closed at the end of July 2001 due to poor visitor numbers, and has been replaced by a household store.
