= Metropolis Towers =

M-Towers
- Interactive map of the M-Towers area
- Alternative names: Metropolis Towers

General information
- Status: Under construction
- Type: Mixed Use
- Location: Gżira, Malta, Testaferrata Street
- Coordinates: 35°54′02.6″N 14°29′30.3″E
- Construction started: 6 April 2015
- Cost: €100 million

Height
- Height: 106 m, 87 m and 55 m

Technical details
- Floor count: 33, 27 and 13

Design and construction
- Architecture firm: EM Architects
- Developer: Metropolis Developments Limited
- Main contractor: Metropolis Developments Limited

Other information
- Parking: 618

The M-towers, also known as the Metropolis Towers, are three towers that are proposed between triq d'Argens and triq Testaferrata within the limits of Msida, Malta, though often mentioned at Gżira and commonly known as the "Testaferrata site". The tallest of the three towers, at 33 stories, would become the second tallest building on the island, only behind the Mercury Tower. The towers would form part of a larger project, Metropolis Plaza, to include a plaza, shops and restaurants. The building is set to affect the skyline of Valletta and the Grand Harbour. The Gzira Local Council did not object to the project. Until early 2023, the project was on hold and no development had taken place on site for years. However, works on the site resumed in February 2023.

== Site ==
The Metropolis project is being built on the site of the former Mira building, which since 1939 hosted the Mamo Brothers garage. The building was one of the few Art Nouveau/Art Deco buildings in Malta.

In the late 1970s, Mamo Brothers (1939) Ltd and its Mira building was taken over by the Zammit group formed by the sons of Eucharist Zammit who in the 1960s used to run the Malta-Gozo ferries. The new Mira Motor Sales Ltd company was the Malta importer of Vauxhall automobiles, and introduced BMW to Malta, though the later lost the brand to Muscats Motors. They also sold Isuzu and Honda.

== Planning and development ==
A consortium of Maltese entrepreneurs (including today's GlobalCapital) bought the site in 2006 and launched the real estate project on the Testaferrata site, foreseeing “a lifestyle building with all apartments having their own view and large terraces”.

The project was aimed at giving new life to Testaferrata Street, which was associated with prostitution.

Construction of the towers was supposed to start in 2007 and was estimated to be complete by 2016. The project was estimated to cost €60 million. However, the project was delayed by a number of years due to a lack of finance and permits.

The land was then sold to developer Jalal Husni Bey, from Libya's HB Group, who had originally foreseen "buy[ing] some apartments.

The project was initially approved by the Malta Environment and Planning Authority (MEPA) on 12 March 2009.

In 2013, Gzira mayor Roberto Cristiano claimed the building would give the locality "a fresh look" and "increase the value of surrounding properties" as well as "increase economic activity in Gzira and may also attract other investment opportunities". He conceded that it would also increase traffic and parking problems.

In November 2014, MEPA approved a number of changes to the Metropolis project, including building a helipad on the roof of the highest tower, a larger car park and the creation of more public places. The project was then estimated at €100 million, almost double the original estimate.

The first stone was laid by Prime Minister Joseph Muscat on 6 April 2015, few days ahead the 2015 Maltese local elections, The early phase of construction was to be delivered by Maltese contractor Polidano, while the towers would be constructed by an Italian and a Dubai-based company, whose names were not disclosed. Nevertheless, no actual works followed, and the foundation stone was later removed. By 2017, it was claimed that the project had still not secured financing. The excavated site remains known by the locals as "the big hole".

According to the representative of the developer, the delays were due to the need to create more parking spaces around the towers. Since the land surrounding the project was not government-owned, the government requisitioned it, and the Lands Authority in October 2016 issued a tender to ensure that Metropolis could obtain access to the space beneath the roads and excavate for two further floors underground, beneath sea level.

Husni Bey claimed that “high rise projects usually scare a lot of people because they would not be used to it. However, we have to recognise that they are a must and every country should have a designated area for high rise buildings.” Husni Bey praised Malta's prime minister Joseph Muscat and those “calling the shots who have been very helpful”, while describing as "very painful" the process of dealing with the Malta Environment and Planning Authority.

In 2019, Husni Bey's business partner Keith Seychell claimed that the project is still on the table, but that Husni Bey could not find a general contractor to take it forward.

A social impact assessment study carried out in August 2019 found great construction fatigue among residents of Gzira, Msida and Ta’ Xbiex. Nearly two thirds of them disagreed with the Metropolis projects and other towers proposed for the same area. Residents lamented in particular air, noise and visual pollution, growing difficulties in finding parking, and growing distrust towards the construction industry. 41% insisted there were no positive impacts to the locality.

== See also ==
- Muscats Motors, across the street in rue d'Argens, Gżira
- Wembley ice-cream factory, across the street in rue d'Argens, Msida
