= Mercury Tower =

Skyscraper in Malta

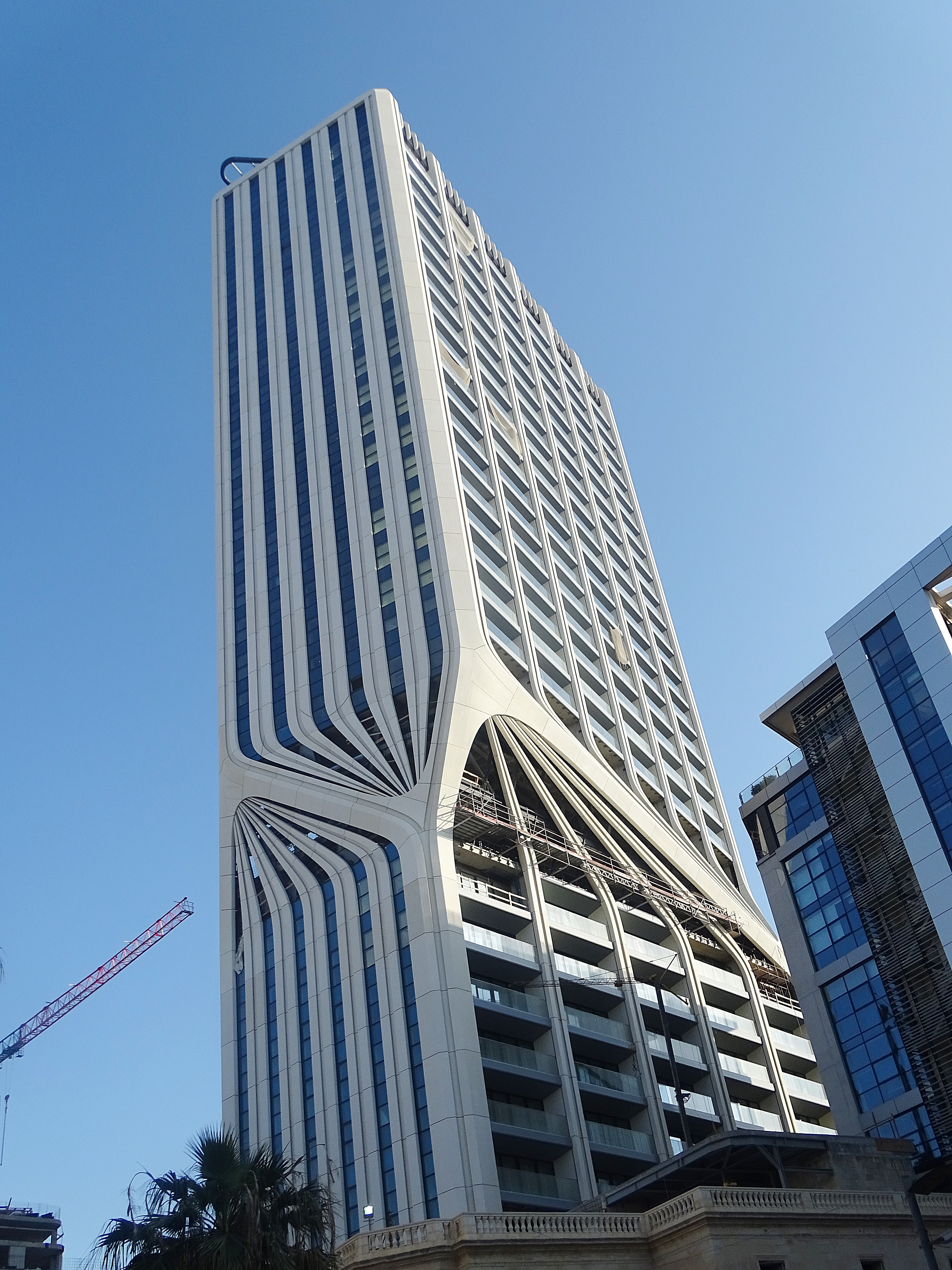
- Mercury Tower nearing completion in 2023

General information
- Status: Completed
- Location: St. Julian's, Malta
- Coordinates: 35.92311°N 14.48934°E
- Completed: 2023

Height
- Top floor: 122 m (400 ft)

Technical details
- Floor count: 33

Design and construction
- Architect: Zaha Hadid

Mercury Tower is a skyscraper situated in St. Julian's, Malta. At 122 metres (400 ft) tall, it has been Malta's tallest building since 2020 when it overtook the Portomaso Tower upon its topping out. The building has 33 floors of mixed residential and hotel space. This development is one of the last concept designs signed off by Iraqi-British architect Zaha Hadid personally before her death in 2016.

The most iconic feature of the building is the twisted area between levels 10 and 13 that provides its distinctive appearance. The tower's design is partially integrated into the former Mercury House, which had been built in 1903 to house the country's telecoms infrastructure. This building is a Grade II listed structure, and has been restored and reinvented as part of the project.

== History ==
Following the 2013 Maltese general election, Joseph Portelli's main project with the new Labour government was the massive development at the Forum Hotel site. In July 2017, Portelli submitted plans for the Mercury Tower. This was originally meant to be limited to 15 floors and to be used for offices, shops, and top-floor apartments and penthouses, as part of the €24 million 2005 concession. Yet, in 2012 the Planning Authority approved extensions of the two towers up to 19 and 18 floors. By the time of Portelli's project, they have grown to 40 and 25 floors. As a "compromise", Portelli developed a single 31-storey building, while retaining a permit for a second 23-floor towers, approved in 2020. The project was met with concerns, notably since it was disclosed that the UK consultancy Mott MacDonald, which had originally drafted the public master plan for Paceville, also worked on engineering reports for the Mercury House project.

The financial sustainability of the Mercury Tower remained in doubt, with over €70 million plus intereststo pay back to bondholders. The completion timeframes also faced delays.

On 10 November 2023, the first phase of Mercury Tower opened to the public for the first time with a three-level shopping mall and a square.

== Image gallery ==
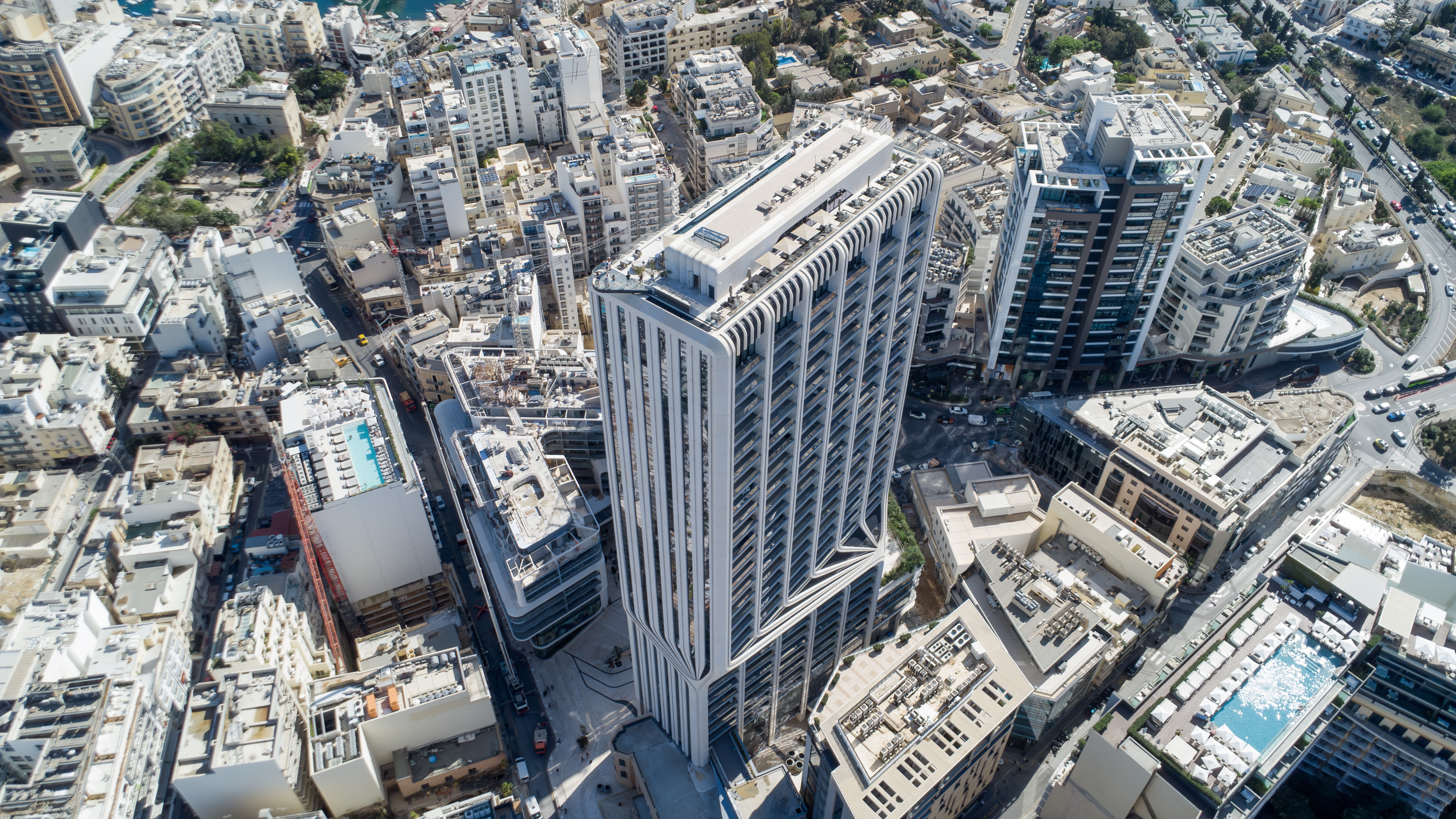
The Mercury Tower is a high-rise, mixed-use building in St. Julian's, Malta.

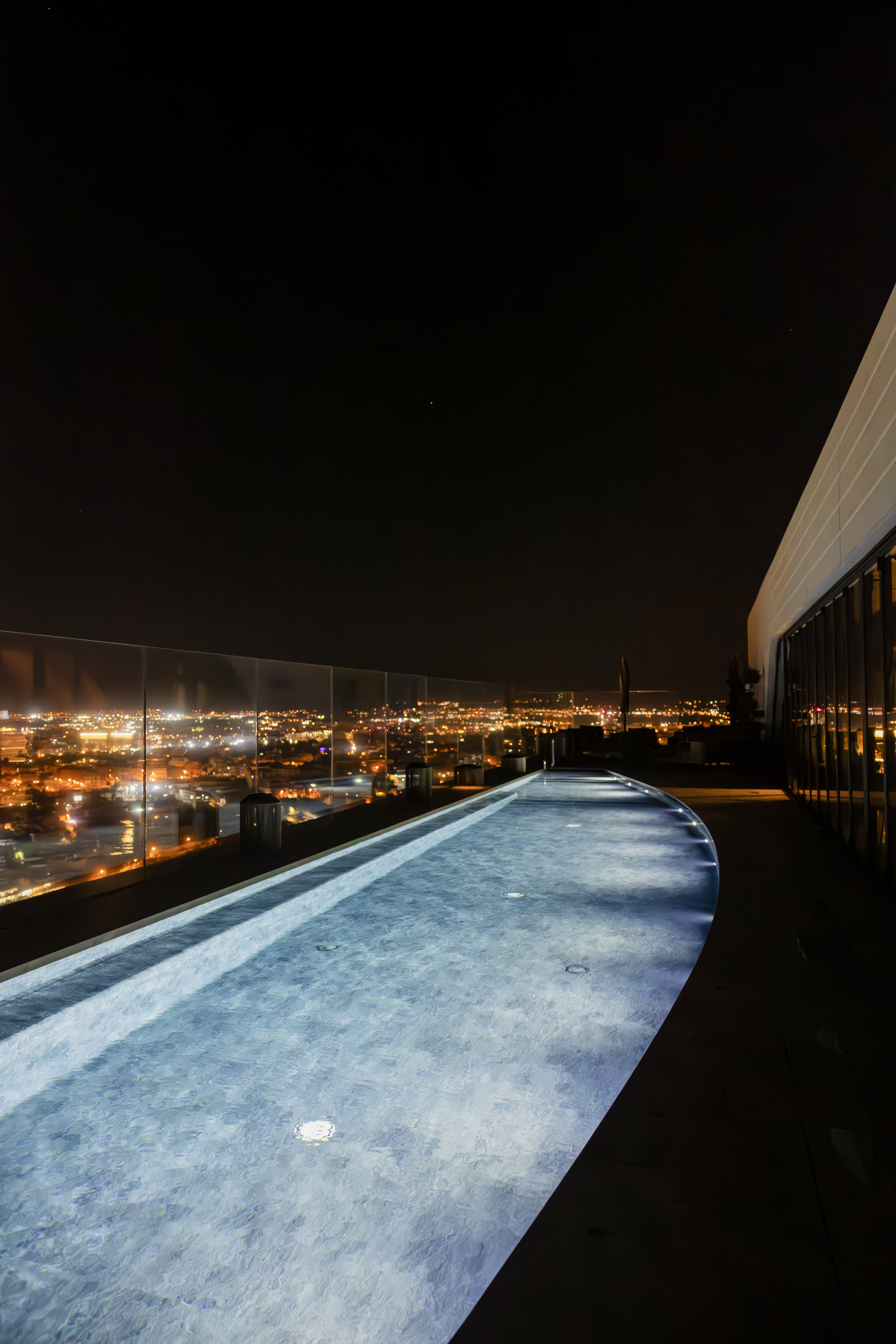
Rooftop Pool of the Mercury Tower at Night

== See also ==
- List of tallest buildings in Malta
