= Battle of Malta poker tournament =

Annual poker tournament in Malta

Battle of Malta
- Sport: Poker
- Founded: 2012
- Owner: casinomalta.com.mt
- CEO: Simon De Cesare
- Motto: Let the battle begin!
- Country: Malta
- Venues: Casino Malta, St Julian's, Malta
- Most recent champions: (Poland) Adrian Ziemichod, (Spring 2025)
- Sponsors: Casino Malta, KKPoker, LuxonPay, novibet poker, AmazingBet, Betwin360, Optibet Poker
- Website: www.battleofmalta.com

The Battle of Malta is an annual no-limit Texas hold 'em variation poker tournament in Malta.

The event was founded by PokerListings.com in 2012 and is now run by Casino Malta. Designed for low- to mid-stakes poker players, the event has gone from strength to strength since its launch and is now one of the most popular stand-alone events in Europe. Battle of Malta won the 2014 European Poker Awards “Event of the Year” title in the category for buy-ins up to €2,000.

The 2024 Battle of Malta Autumn Edition took place from October 29 to November 6 at Casino Malta and the Eden Arena within the Intercontinental Hotel Malta. With the participation of thousands of players, the event set a new benchmark.

The festival shattered records with an impressive total prize pool of nearly €4.8 million, exceeding the previous record of €3.8 million set in October 2019, prior to the pandemic, by over €1 million. This achievement highlights the continued growth and popularity of the Battle of Malta as one of Europe’s premier poker events.

== 2026 Summer Edition ==
The Battle of Malta Summer Edition is scheduled to run from May 27 to June 3, 2026 at Casino Malta. The €600 buy-in Main Event carries a €700,000 guarantee across five starting flights from May 28–31, with Day 2 beginning May 31. The final table is set for June 3. The festival also features a €100,000 guaranteed Mystery Bounty event. Multiple satellite paths are available throughout the festival, including €70 mega satellites and €140 super satellites awarding Main Event seats directly.

== History ==
=== Battle of Malta 2012 ===
In the inaugural 2012 tournament, there were a total of 349 entries paying the entry fee of €550 to the main event, creating a total prize pool of €169,265.

A retired doctor, Nicodemo Piccolo took home the first-ever Battle of Malta title, trophy and €35,000 first prize.

=== Battle of Malta 2013 ===
The 2013 Battle of Malta main event took place from September 26 to 29, featuring the return of Kara Scott as host and appearances by pro players Daniel Cates and Andreas Hoivold. Battle of Malta 2013 turned out to be the largest Poker tournament to ever take place in Malta. With a record 888 entrants at €550 each, the prize pool was €430,680. The first place prize of €68,000 was won by Louis Cartarius, a Frankfurt based online player.

=== Battle of Malta 2014 ===
The 2014 Battle of Malta took place from November 6–9 and broke its own record for the biggest poker tournament ever held in Malta with 1,447 entries. The €550 buy-in main event easily smashed the €500,000 guarantee with a total prize pool of €701,795. A record €140,000 was set aside for the winner and €90,000 for second place. Bulgarian Antoan Katsarov was the eventual winner with Malta local Alan Brincat finishing in second place.

In an unusual turn of events Katsarov won the tournament without busting Brincat. When play reached nine players and action was expected to run into the Casino’s hard cutoff time of 5 a.m., players were given the option of stopping and returning the following day or continuing play. Players unanimously agreed to play on and play did reach the hard stop with just Katsarov and Brincat left.

As per the rules set down by the Tournament Director and agreed to by the players, Katsarov was declared the winner and the final prize money was allocated according to chip counts. Katsarov collected €122,750 and the Battle of Malta trophy and Brincat collected €250,000. €107,250.

Katsarov also had the rare opportunity of choosing the winning hand of the tournament. He picked the Jack Ten of hearts to display for the winner photos.

The event's success saw it awarded “Event of the Year" in the €2,000+ buy-in category in the European Poker Awards in 2015.

2014: Over 30 Professional Players in Attendance

The 2014 BOM attracted more professional poker players than ever before. American Maria Ho took over hosting duties from ESPN host Kara Scott.

Johnny Lodden, Thor Hansen, Fabrice Soulier, Gaëlle Garcia Diaz, Leo Margets, Luca Moschitta, Sofia Lovgren, Dominik Panka, Luca Pagano, Rupert Elder, Dominik Nitsche, Marcin Horecki, Hugo Lemaire, Andreas Hoivold and Konstantin Puchkov were all in attendance.

Norwegian actor Fridtjov Såheim, from the Netflix television series Lilyhammer also played. Eight different countries were represented at the 10-man final table. Sweden, the Netherlands, Bulgaria, France, Ireland, Poland and Italy all had players while Alan Brincat represented his home country of Malta.

2014 Spirit of Poker Awards

The 2014 PokerListings Spirit of Poker Awards were also handed out at the Battle of Malta. Accepting awards in person were Rising Star Dominik Panka and Living Legend Thor Hansen. Accepting his award via submitted video was 2014 Most Inspiring Player Shannon Shorr.

=== Battle of Malta 2015 ===
The 2015 Battle of Malta again broke its own record for biggest poker tournament ever held on Malta. The €550 Main Event attracted 1,804 entries and generated a prize pool of over €875,000. The three top finishers all earned over €100,000 after a three-way deal. France’s Nicolas Proust was the champion after he defeated Norwegian Henrik Jacobsen heads-up. Third-place finisher Hendrik Koops, of the Netherlands, actually took the biggest prize of €125,000 because of the deal. Because of the size of the field the final table was played on the Monday. Celebrities and poker pros in attendance included American Idol star William Hung, Olympic Field Hockey Gold Medallist Fatima Moreira de Melo, former tennis professional Raemon Sluiter, Italian reality TV performer Sabina Hiatullah, Norwegian TV star Tone Damli, Finnish singer/model Kim Herold and Costa Rican poker legend Humberto Brenes.

Poker pros Anatoly Filatov, Charlie Carrel and Brenes received the 2015 PokerListings Spirit of Poker Awards.

Amazing Race 15 contestant Maria Ho returned for her second year as host.

=== Battle of Malta 2016 ===
The 2016 Battle of Malta once again broke its own record for biggest poker tournament ever held on Malta for the fifth consecutive year. The main event saw 1,813 entries this time around and a record prize pool of €879,305.

The winner, Robert Berglund from Falun, Sweden, took home the biggest Battle of Malta payout to date €160,000. A deal was briefly discussed when play was six-handed but eventual runner-up, John Finnighan Linkins from Ireland, wasn’t happy with the terms and said no. He ended up taking home the second-place prize of €110,000. Incredibly Berglund’s best friend from Falun, Rasmus Eriksson, also made the final table and finished third for €67,000.

Six nationalities were represented at the final table with 3 players from Sweden, one from Norway, two from Italy, one from Spain, one from Ireland and one player, Lawrence Brandt, all the way from the USA.

For the first-time ever the final table (and feature table from the day before) was live streamed for viewers on PokerListings.com and Twitch. The live stream was sponsored by Betsafe, NordicBet and Betsson. Global Poker League host Roland Boothby, Rikard Åberg, NordicBet poker manager Jostein Grødum and PokerListings’ Matt Showell, Dirk Oetzmann and Maria Ho commentated

All of the 2016 Battle of Malta festival side events shattered records as well with €1,295,853.15 in total prize pools paid out across all events.

The fourth annual PokerListings Spirit of Poker Awards were also handed out. Brazil’s Felipe ‘Mojave’ Ramos was named Most Inspiring Player. Norway’s Silje Nilsen was named Rising Star and Russia’s Konstantin Puchkov won the Living Legend award.

Amazing Race 15 contestant Maria Ho returned for her third year as host.

Celebrity and pro guests included 2016 WSOP November Niner Fernando Pons, Fabrice Soulier, Leo Margets, Claire Renaut, Sofia Lovgren, Andreas Hoivold, Konstantin Puchkov, Finnish DJ Amanda Harkimo and Norwegian rapper and TV star Petter Katastrofe.

The 2014 Battle of Malta won the European Poker Award for Best Poker Event Under €2,000 Buy-In. The 2015 Battle of Malta was also nominated for the award.

=== Battle of Malta 2017 ===
The 2017 Battle of Malta once again broke its own record for largest poker tournament ever held on the island of Malta. French TV presenter and model Gaelle Garcia Diaz took over the hosting duties from Maria Ho.

The €550 buy-in Main Event drew 2,074 entries – the first time the field crossed the 2,000-entry mark – and created a prize pool of €1,005,890.

Israeli farmer Nadav Lipszyc won the Main Event over a final table with four Israelis, three Norwegians and two Swedes and collected €200,000 for first place – more than the entire prize pool of the first Battle of Malta back in 2012. It was Lipsyzc’s first live tournament other than the satellite he played in Israel to win his seat in the BoM main event.

“I think that Daniel Negreanu entered my body and played for me," said Lipszyc after his win. “I can’t believe this was my own performance. All I did was play my instincts. I don’t read books on poker. I don’t study. When I play online, I play for one or two Euro. I came here with basically no money in my pocket. I barely had money for breakfast. You might not believe it but this is the first live event I’ve ever played except for the satellite. I’ve never known what I was really good at. I think I know it now.”

Fellow Israeli Yaron Borenstein finished second for €132,000. Norway’s Asbjorn Elvevold finished third for €98,000

Sweden’s Jonas Hähnert, who finished in 8th place, also made the final table of the Battle of Malta Main Event in 2016 when he finished 9th. He’s the only player ever to make two BoM main event final tables.

Places	Player	Payout
1	Nadav Patrick Lipszyc	€200,000
2	Yaron Borenstein	€132,000
3	Asbjorn Elvevold	€98,000
4	Joakim Mats Thomas Wickstrom	€74,000
5	Avihai Benshoham	€52,000
6	Per-Eirik Koi	€34,000
7	Dor Adda	€24,000
8	Jonas Hähnert	€16,300
9	Fredrik Akerholt	€12,240

==== Live Stream ====
The Battle of Malta main event final table was once again live streamed on PokerListings.com and on Twitch and hole cards shown for the first time.

The entire final table lasted 5 hours and the stream was hosted once again by Roland Boothby with a revolving group of guest commentators including Garcia Diaz and Andreas Hoivold.

==== Side Event Results ====
All side events at the 2017 Battle of Malta poker festival also hit record levels with just under €400,000 paid out in side event prize pools. A look at the side event numbers below:

€220 + €25 Siege of Malta Second Chance—560 entries - Prize Pool €119,504

€1,200 + €120 Grandmaster High Roller—135 Entries - Prize Pool €157,140

€90 + €10 BOM Ladies - 75 entries - Prize Pool €6,548

€100 + €10 Win the Cross—177 entries - Prize Pool €17,169

€200 + €25 PLO Knight Crusaders—133 entries - Prize Pool €25,802

€200 + €20 Turbo IPC After Battle—225 entries - Prize Pool €43,650

€300 + €30 Deepstack Turbo—259 entries - Prize Pool €75,369

€150 + €15 Play2Care Charity Crazy Pineapple - 160 entries - Prize Pool €23,280

==== PokerListings Spirit of Poker Awards 2017 ====
The 2017 Spirit of Poker Award winners were also presented at the 2017 Battle of Malta. Over 3 months of fan voting online the following players were named the winners:

Most Inspiring Player - Liv Boeree

Rising Star - Espen Uhlen Jørstad

Living Legend - Per Hildebrand

=== Battle of Malta 2018 ===
In 2018, Battle of Malta changed hands and was hosted by Casino Malta, part of the Eden Leisure Group. The event took place October 25–30 in a brand new venue – the spacious Eden Arena at the InterContinental Arena Conference Centre and was hosted by presenter Laura Cornelius. The €550 buy-in Main Event was given a €1,000,000 guarantee for the first time. With 3,816 entries for the Main Event – nearly double the expected number – and 13,000 tournament entries overall, the tournament venue was packed throughout the six-day festival making the 2018 Battle of Malta a spectacular success.

Malta-based French player Julien Stropoli took down the Main Event for €168,500 after cutting a five-way deal. He bested a tough final table featuring previous MPN Poker Tour finalist Mantas Urbonas, two-time Unibet Open champion Mateusz Moolhuizen and Grosvenor Ambassador Andy Hills, as well as fellow French pro Maxime Canevet (who was runner-up). The total prize pool was €1,850,760, shared by 570 players and nearly double the €1,000,000 guarantee.

Main Event final table results:

Place	Name	Prize	Deal
1	Julien Stropoli	€300,000	€168,500
2	Maxime Canevet	€170,000	€192,000
3	Erik Ostergaard	€115,000	€139,500
4	Mantas Urbonas	€80,000	€121,500
5	Abdallah Fakhreddine	€65,000	€108,500
6	Andy Hills	€53,000	
7	Gustav Vadenbring	€41,000	
8	Mateusz Moolhuizen	€30,000	
9	Jerry Mangum	€23,000	

==== Side Events ====
There were a total of 15 side events at the 2018 Battle of Malta, including super satellites.

The €1,320 High Roller was won by Italy’s Simone Speranza for €60,000 in a high-speed final that included Estonian poker legend Henri Kasper. There were 240 entries generating a total prize pool of €279,360. The Poker League of Nations Ladies Event was won by Latvia’s Madara Sviksa for €2,533. Her prize also included a stunning iconic sterling silver bracelet from luxury jewellers Tiffany & Co. British player Paul Jux-Holderness won himself a seat for the 2019 Battle of Malta by beating tennis legend Boris Becker heads-up in the Pink October Malta charity event. The tournament raised a total of €20,000 including player donations, ticket sales and a hefty contribution from Casino Malta by Olympic Casino. The €88 Crazy 888s Battle was won by Daniel Sagians for €4,934 after he beat a 302-strong field. Norwegian player Erik Dallan beat Irish stalwart Annette O'Carroll to take down the €150 MPNPT Battle for €17,331. The €300 + €30 EPS Battle was won by Estonia's Mario Linno for €24,069 while Lukasz Fraczek from Poland took down the €200 + €20 IPC Battle, hosted by the Israeli Poker Championship.

==== Live stream ====
A cards-up live stream ran throughout the Main Event hosted by commentator Roy Brindley.

=== Battle of Malta 2019 ===
The Battle of Malta 2019 is taking place October 25–30 and will again be held in the spacious Eden Arena at the InterContinental Conference Centre, adjacent to Casino Malta. Now heading into its eighth consecutive year, the event has built a solid reputation as the #1 destination No Limit tournament for low to mid-stakes poker players. The battle was streamed on Youtube, Twitch, and on the Battle of the Malta Website.

== Main Event results 2012-2019 ==
Date/Local	Event/Buy-in	Entries	Prize Pool	Winner	Prize	Results
22 - 25 November 2012; Portomaso Casino, St. Julian's	Battle of Malta 2012 - €550	349	€169,265	(Italy) Nicodemo Piccolo	€35,000	
26 - 29 September 2013; Portomaso Casino, St. Julian's	Battle of Malta 2013 - €550 €200,000 Prize pool Guaranteed	888	€430,680	(Germany) Louis Cartarius	€68,000 *	
6 - 9 November 2014; Portomaso Casino, St. Julian's	Battle of Malta 2014 - €550 €500,000 Prize pool Guaranteed	1,447	€701,795	(Bulgaria) Antoan Katsarov	€122,750 *	
4 - 8 November 2015; Portomaso Casino, St. Julian's	Battle of Malta 2015 - €550 €500,000 Prize pool Guaranteed	1,804	€874,940	(France) Nicolas Proust	€110,000 *	
2 - 7 November 2016; Portomaso Casino, St. Julian's	Battle of Malta 2016 - €550 €500,000 Prize pool Guaranteed	1,813	€879,305	(Sweden) Robert Berglund	€160,000	
2 - 7 November 2017; Portomaso Casino, St. Julian's	Battle of Malta 2017 - €550 €500,000 Prize pool Guaranteed	2,074	€1,005,890	(Israel) Nadav Lipszyc	€200,000	
25 - 30 October 2018; Portomaso Casino, St. Julian's	Battle of Malta 2018 - €550 €1,000,000 Prize pool Guaranteed	3,816	€1,850,760	(France) Julien Stropoli	€168,500 *	
16 - 22 October 2019; Casino Malta, St. Julian's	Battle of Malta 2019 - €550 €1,000,000 Prize pool Guaranteed	4,657	€2,258,645	(Moldova) Serghei Lisii	€247,167 *	

* denote deal

== Main Event Online Results 2020-2021 ==
Date/Local	Event/Buy-in	Entires	Prize Pool	Winner	Prize	Results
1 - 22 November 2020; Online at GGPoker	Battle of Malta 2020 Online - $550 $3,000,000 Prize pool Guaranteed	8,789	$4,592,252	(Brazil) Rodrigo Selouan "Eureka!!"	$636,477	
11 - 25 July 2021; Online at GGPoker	Battle of Malta 2021 Online - €550 €3,000,000 Prize pool Guaranteed	6,591	€3,443,798	(New Zealand) "Raggaz"	€378,285	IMG

== Season 2022 ==
Date/Local	Event/Buy-in	Entires	Prize Pool	Winner	Prize	Results
21 - 26 April; Casino Malta, St. Julian's	(Malta) BoM 2022 Spring Edition - €555 €500,000 Prize pool Guaranteed	2,592	€1,244,160	(Italy) Giuseppe Rosa	€200,340	
10 - 31 July; Online at GGPoker	BoM 2022 Online Edition - €550 €2,500,000 Prize pool Guaranteed	7,104	€3,711,840	(Montenegro) Almaz Zhdanov "Alister333"	€395,747	IMG
4 - 12 October; Casino Malta, St. Julian's	(Malta) BoM 2022 Autumn Edition - €555 €1,000,000 Prize pool Guaranteed	4,329	€2,084,160	(Greece) Dimitrios Anastasakis	€285,900 *	

* denote deal

== Season 2023 ==
Date/Local	Event/Buy-in	Entires	Prize Pool	Winner	Prize	Results
31 May - 6 June; Casino Malta, St. Julian's	(Malta) BoM 2023 Summer Edition - €600 €500,000 Prize pool Guaranteed	1,992	€1,002,972	(Italy) Dario Barone	€156,500	YouTube: Battle of Malta Main Event Final Table (5h19m22s)
18 - 25 October; Casino Malta, St. Julian's	(Malta) BoM 2023 Autumn Edition - €600 €1,000,000 Prize pool Guaranteed	3,432	€1,728,010	(Italy) Gabriele Re	€209,500 *	YouTube: Battle of Malta Final Table October 2023 (7h08m07s)

* denote deal

== Season 2024 ==
Date/Local	Event/Buy-in	Entires	Prize Pool	Winner	Prize	Results
3 - 10 April; Casino Malta, St. Julian's	(Malta) BoM 2024 Spring Edition - €600 €500,000 Prize pool Guaranteed	1,814	€913,349	(Greece) Vasileios Zisis	€100,000	YouTube: Battle of Malta Final Table Spring Edition 2024 (8h40m00s)
29 October - 6 November; Casino Malta, St. Julian's	(Malta) BoM 2024 Autumn Edition - €600 €1,500,000 Prize pool Guaranteed	5,799	€2,578,172	(Spain) Cosme Gomez Martinez	€255,800*	

* denote deal

== Season 2025 ==
Date/Local	Event/Buy-in	Entires	Prize Pool	Winner	Prize	Results
2 - 9 April; Casino Malta, St. Julian's	(Malta) BoM 2025 Spring Edition - €600 €500,000 Prize pool Guaranteed	1,542	€776,397	(Poland) Adrian Ziemichod	€120,000	
28 October-5 November; Casino Malta, St. Julian's	(Malta) BoM 10th Anniversary Edition - €600 €2,000,000 Prize pool Guaranteed	6,039	€2,728,270	(Italy) Candido Cappiello	€225,770*	

* = denote deal

== Season 2026 ==
Date/Local	Event/Buy-in	Entires	Prize Pool	Winner	Prize	Results
27 May-3 June; Casino Malta, St. Julian's	(Malta) BoM 2026 Summer Edition - €600 €700,000 Main Event Prizepool Guaranteed	2,667	€1,186,962	(Australia) Alejandro Asenjo	€94,520*	
27 October-4 November; Casino Malta, St. Julian's	(Malta) BoM 2026 Autumn Edition - €600 €1,500,000 Main Event Prizepool Guaranteed	5,368	€2,384,785	(Czech Republic) Tereza Vernerova	€162,635	

== Season 2027 ==
Date/Local	Event/Buy-in	Entires	Prize Pool	Winner	Prize	Results
18-24 January; Casino Barcelona; Barcelona, Spain	(Spain) BoM Barcelona Edition 2027 - €tbc					+info
21 May- 2 June; Casino Malta, St. Julian's	(Malta) BoM (Flagship) 2027 - €tbc					
14-21 June; Card Casino Bratislava; Bratislava, Slovakia	BoM Slovakia Edition 2027 - €tbc					
tbc Casino Malta, St. Julian's	(Malta) BoM Autumn Edition 2027 - €tbc					
14-19 December; Olympic Park Casino; Tallinn, Estonia	BoM Estonia Edition 2027 - €tbc					

* = deal
