= St. Julian's Choral Group =

The St. Julian's Choral Group is a singing group formed in March 2003 and based in St. Julian's, Malta. The group primarily consists of former members of the St. Julian's Choir. Ronnie Galea, a member of the St. Julian's Choir since 1974, established the St. Julian's Choral Group following the dissolution of the Choir. This group collaborates closely with the St. Julian's Band.

In 2006, local baritone Pio Dalli took over the direction of the choir after its previous director, Mro. Joseph Gatt, left to fulfill commitments abroad. Past choir organists, including Patrick Falzon Grech and Edward Grech, have significantly contributed to the choir's success. Currently, Marie Claire Gatt holds the position of choir organist.

Over the past years, the choir has performed in numerous liturgical services and concerts at various churches and locations across in Malta. The group has also performed abroad. In October 2012, they were invited to participate in an annual concert of choirs organized by ‘Coro La Sissila’ in Montecchio Maggiore, Province of Vicenza, Italy. Additionally, the group performed in London in 2015.
