= Portomaso =

Coordinates: 35°55′19″N 14°29′33″E

Portomaso Business Tower
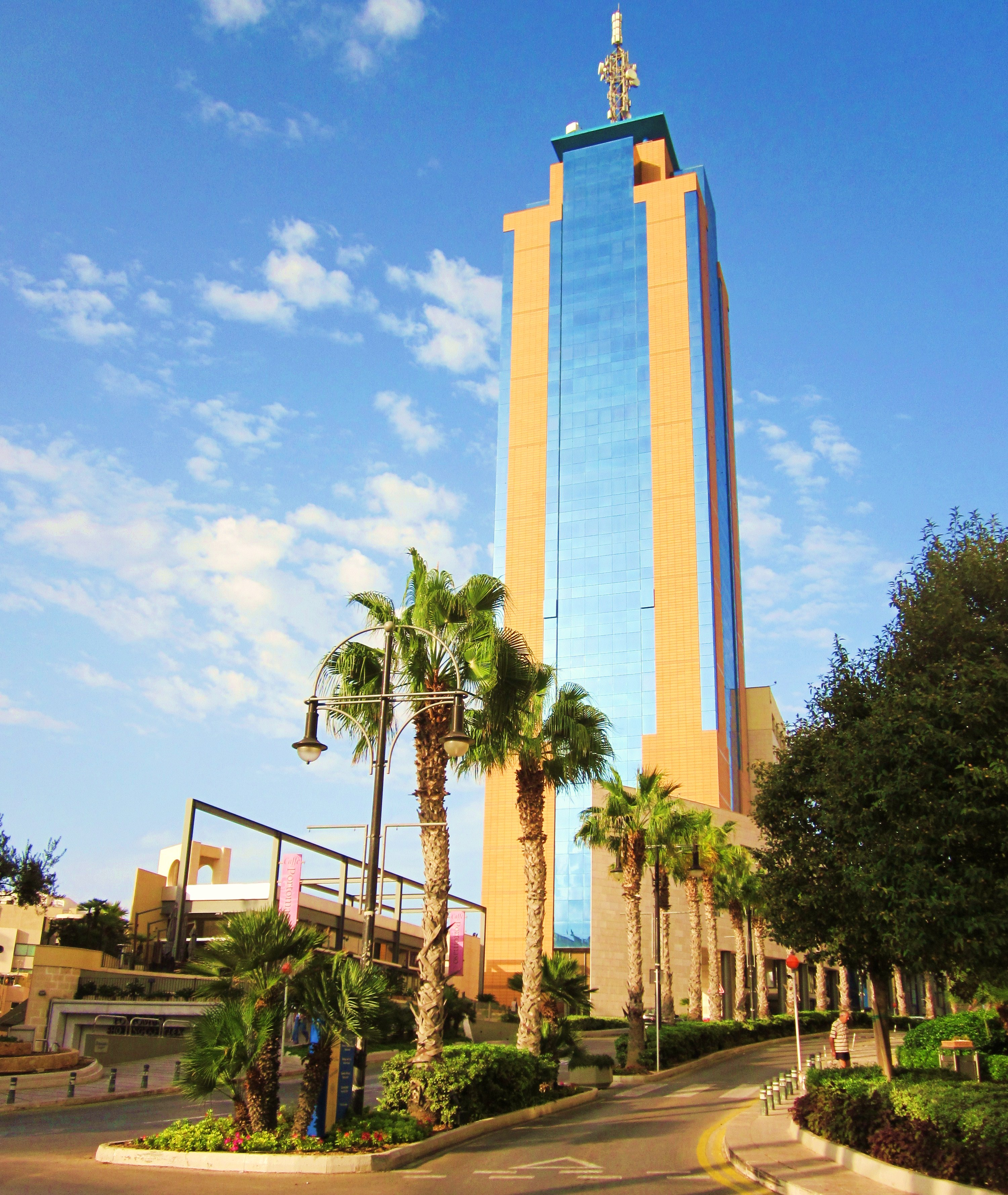
- Portomaso Business Tower

General information
- Status: Completed
- Type: Commercial offices
- Architectural style: Modernist
- Location: St. Julian's, Malta
- Completed: 2001

Height
- Top floor: 97.54 m (320.0 ft)

Technical details
- Floor count: 23
- Floor area: floors 1-6 = 465 m^{2} (5,000 sq ft); 295 m^{2} (3,200 sq ft)

Design and construction
- Architects: Edward Bencini & Associates

Website
- tumas.com/industry/the-portomaso-business-tower/

The Portomaso Business Tower (Maltese: Torri ta' Portomaso, often referred to by locals as simply "Portomaso") is a high-rise office building in Malta. The tower stands in the Portomaso section of St. Julian's, a town just north of Malta's capital city, Valletta. Opened in 2001, the tower is 97.54 metres (320.0 ft) tall, with 23 floors of mixed commercial office space. It became Malta's tallest building upon its completion, and remained so until 2020 when it was surpassed by the Mercury Tower, also in St. Julian's.

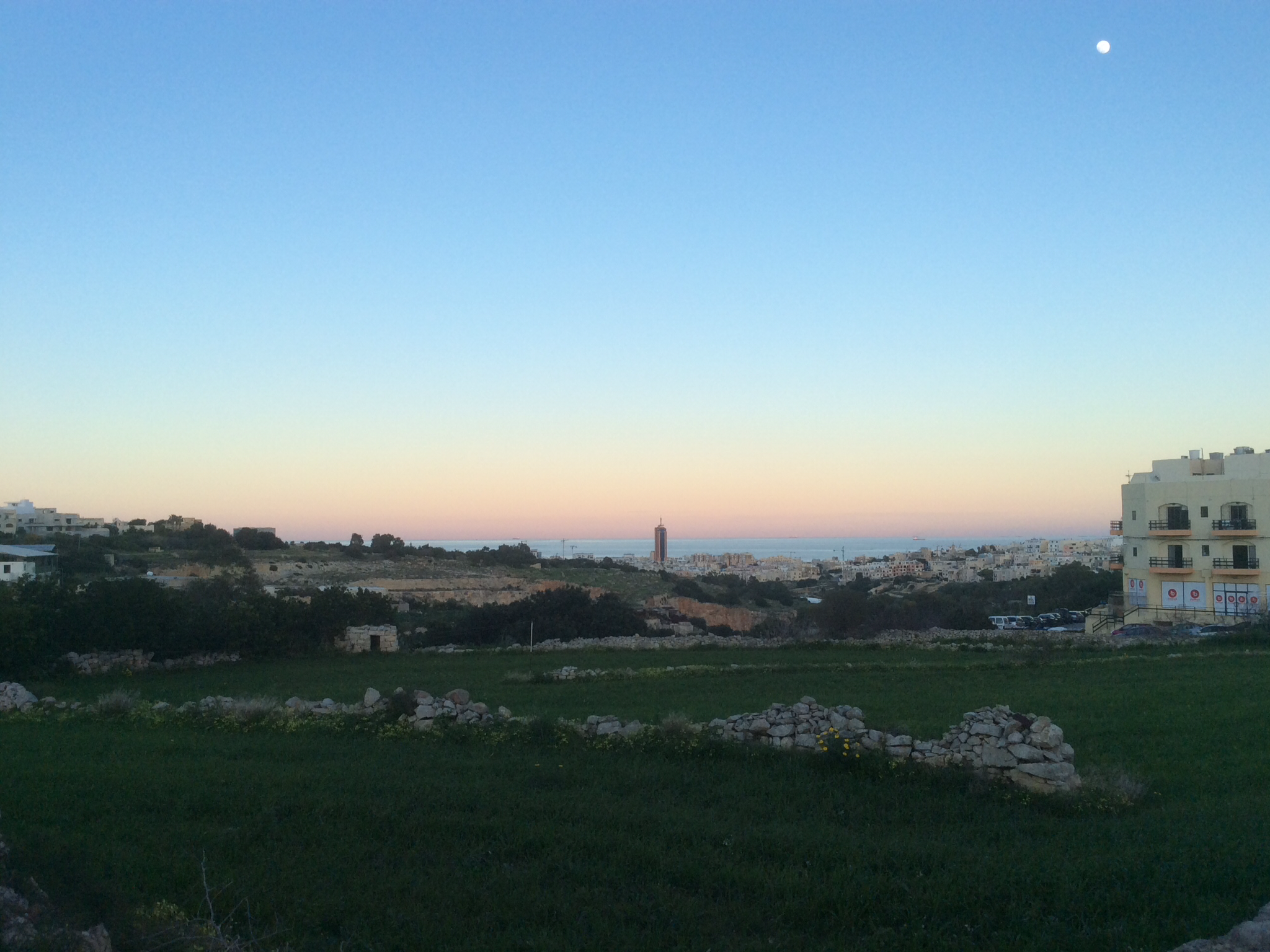
Portomaso as seen from San Ġwann

The first six floors of the tower have 465 square metres (5,010 sq ft) of floor space each, while the remaining floors have 295 m^{2} (3,180 sq ft) each. The main floor is occupied by a shopping centre while the top floor of the building is a nightclub with balconies affording views of the island nation.

The tower is located close to Paceville, which is the main nightlife hub in Malta, and overlooks the Portomaso Marina. The surrounding area has many hotels, apartments, bars, restaurants, shops and a tree-lined promenade, including Hilton Malta (situated in the Portomaso waterfront development).

== Portomaso Casino ==
The Portomaso Casino, located in the tower, was the venue for the 2012 and 2013 Battle of Malta Poker Tournament.

== See also ==
List of tallest buildings in Malta
