= Paceville =

- Administrative Committee
- Kumitat Amministrattiv Paceville
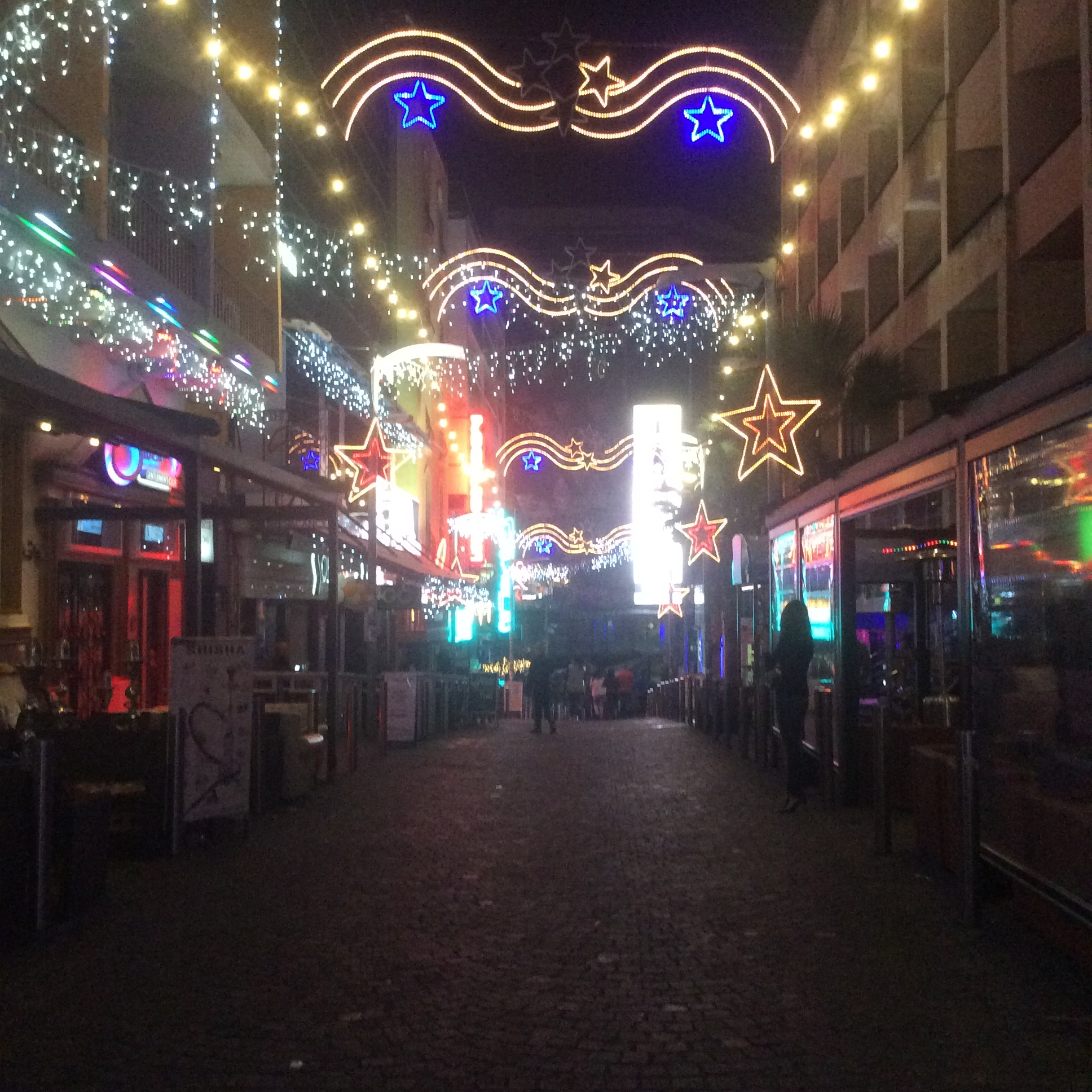
- A street in Paceville

- Coat of arms

- Location within Malta
- Coordinates: 35°55′25.32″N 14°29′29.04″E
- Country: Malta
- Island: Malta
- Suburb of: St. Julian's

Government
  - Chairman: Richard Scicluna
- Time zone: UTC+1 (CET)
  - Summer (DST): UTC+2 (CEST)
- Postal code: STJ
- Dialing code: 356

Paceville (PAH-chuh-vil sometimes abbreviated PV) is a district in St Julian's which is the main nightlife hub in Malta, being heavily populated with nightclubs, bars, strip clubs, pubs and restaurants. It is hence also known as 'Malta's Sin City'. Paceville is located between Spinola Point and Dragonara Point, delimiting Spinola Bay and St. George's Bay respectively.

In 2016, it was estimated that Paceville's population stood around 1,939, of which 1,160 were foreigners.

== Origins ==
=== Early years ===
Paceville traces its origins in the 1910s and 1920s when prominent lawyer and developer Dr Giuseppe Pace (1890–1971) built a few seaside residences in the area of St. Julian's known as 'il-Qaliet', the small bay between the Dragonara Peninsula and Portomaso. Some of these residencies are still there today, although they are now surrounded by the multi-storey apartments and hotels in the area.

Pace's houses were initially rented out to a number of British servicemen who were stationed in the nearby St. Andrew's and St. George's barracks. In the period between the two World Wars, some of these early Paceville residences started to be rented to the Maltese as well. With the arrival of locals in the area of St. Julian's, Dr Pace decided to finance the building of a chapel run by the Augustinian fathers. In December 2000 an adoration chapel known as the Millennium Chapel was inaugurated and two years later an adjoining complex known as WOW ("Wishing Others Well"). This serves the needs of various voluntary groups that offer free community services to callers from all over Malta; the WOW chapel is all day and night. Prior to the construction of the chapel in Paceville, the Augustinian order in Malta had already built another chapel as well as a convent in St. George's Bay, dedicated to St Rita. These buildings too are still standing and are located just behind Bay Street.

=== Redevelopment ===
The areas around Paceville after the war were mostly farming communities surrounded with fields, and Paceville itself only had a few restaurants. Unlike today, parking in Paceville was relatively straightforward as people used to park their cars in fields, one of them being the field on which the St. George's Park hotel was built.

Paceville's slow transition into a tourist hub commenced in the 1960s, when two major hotel corporations, the Sheraton and the Hilton, developed five-star hotel properties in the area.

The Sheraton opened its hotel in the Dragonara Peninsula. Prior to its transformation, the Dragonara Hotel served other purposes. Originally it was the summer residence of Malta's wealthiest banker, Marquis Emanuel Scicluna, known as ic-Cisk. In times of war, the palace was converted into a military hospital and headquarters of voluntary services. It was redeveloped as a casino, and has now since been redeveloped again in the 1990s by Westin Hotels.

At around the same time, a number of bars and clubs started to open in the area in view of the increasing number of British servicemen and tourists living in St. Julian's, St. Andrew's and Pembroke. Throughout the years, bars, clubs, discotheques and additional hotels were developed. Nowadays Paceville is full of nightclubs, strip-clubs, bars and restaurants.

Nowadays many youths from 13 years old upwards go to Paceville frequently. Fights and violent incidents happen frequently.

On 15 November 2015, a glass banister collapsed in the +1 Club injuring 71 young people, with 2 being critically injured. The incident triggered concerns about children going to Paceville, and both Prime Minister Joseph Muscat and leader of the opposition Simon Busuttil have called for better safety measures.

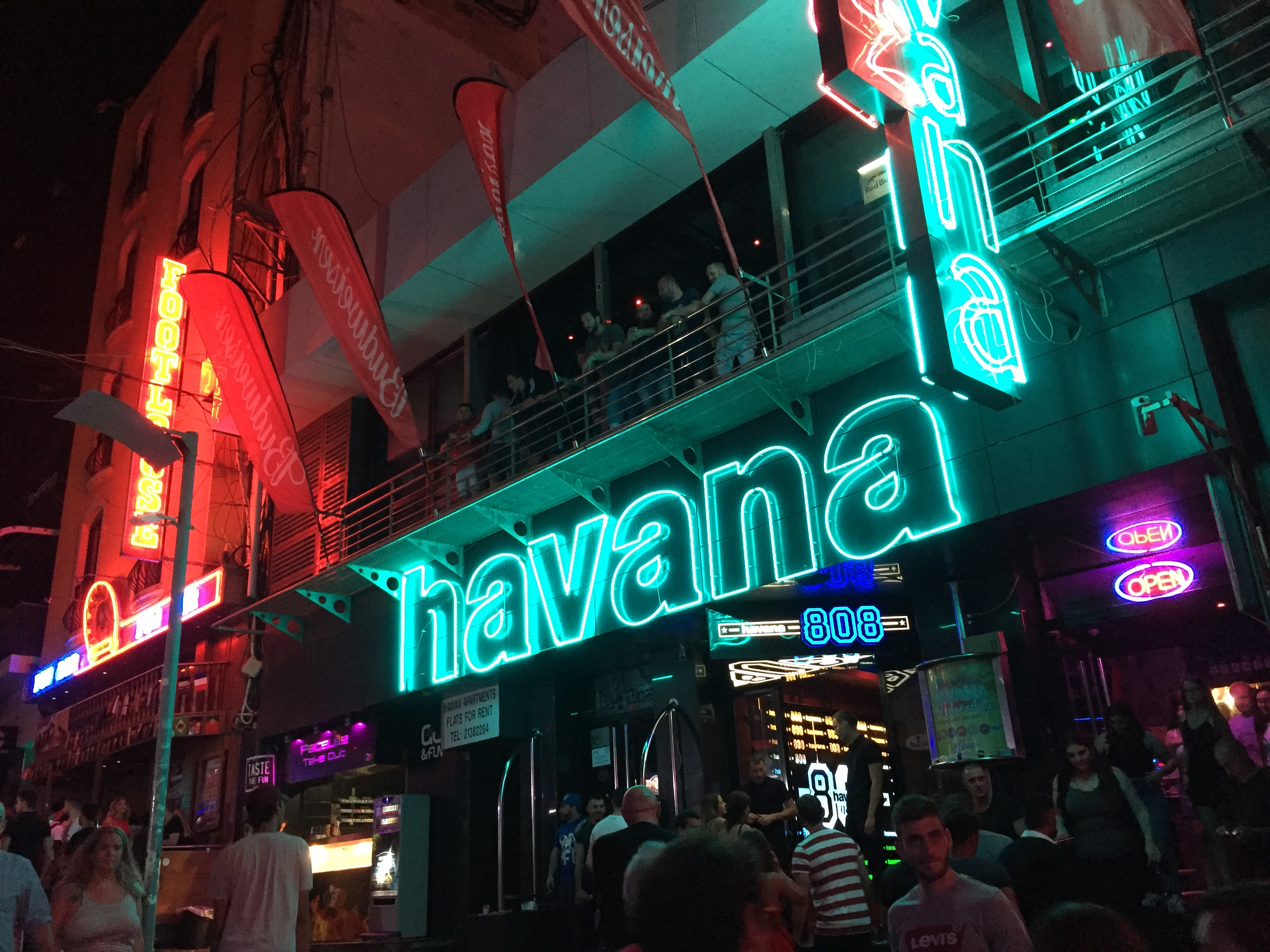
Havana night club

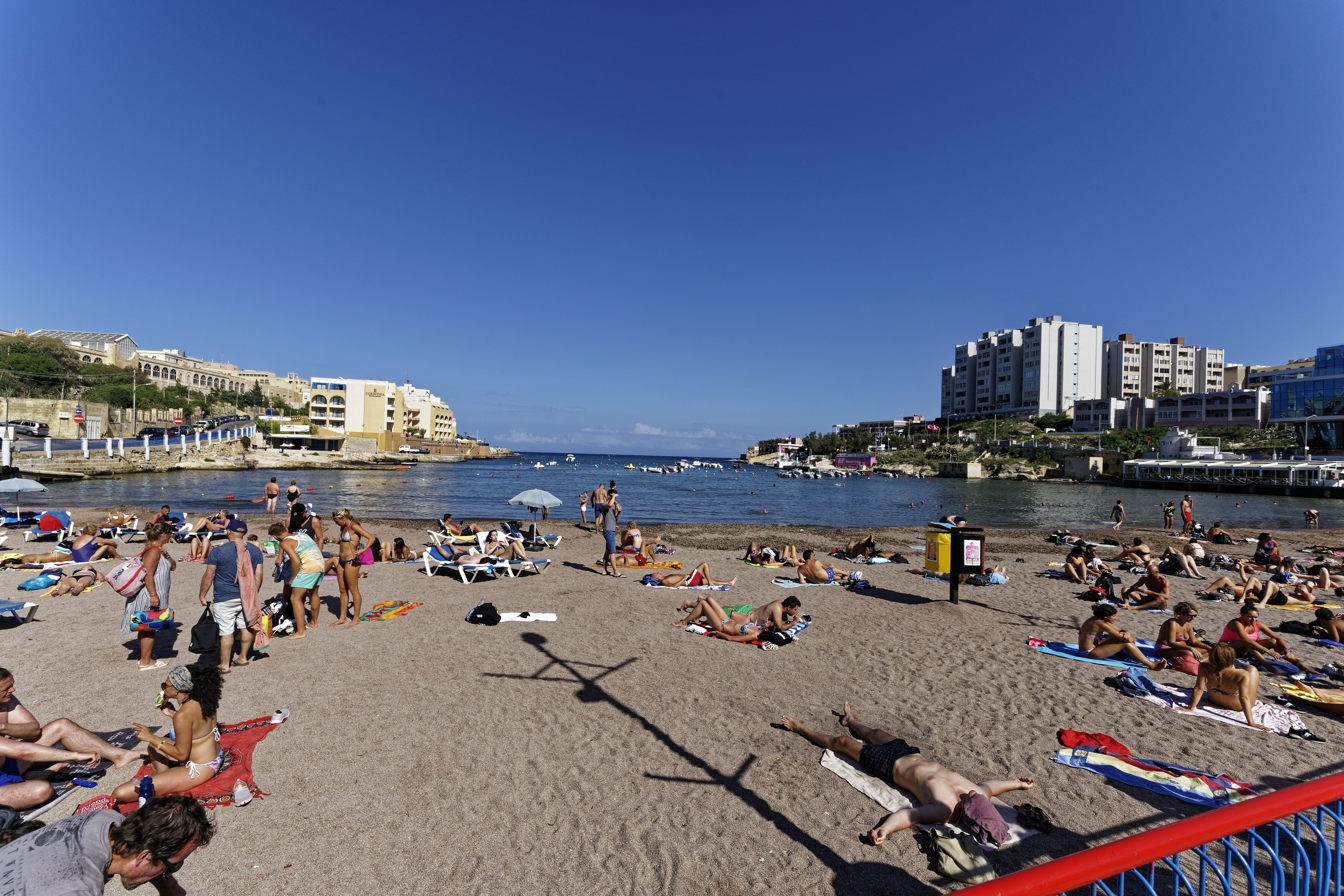
Beach in Paceville
