= St. Julian's, Malta =

Saint Julian's San Ġiljan Il-Qaliet
- Local council
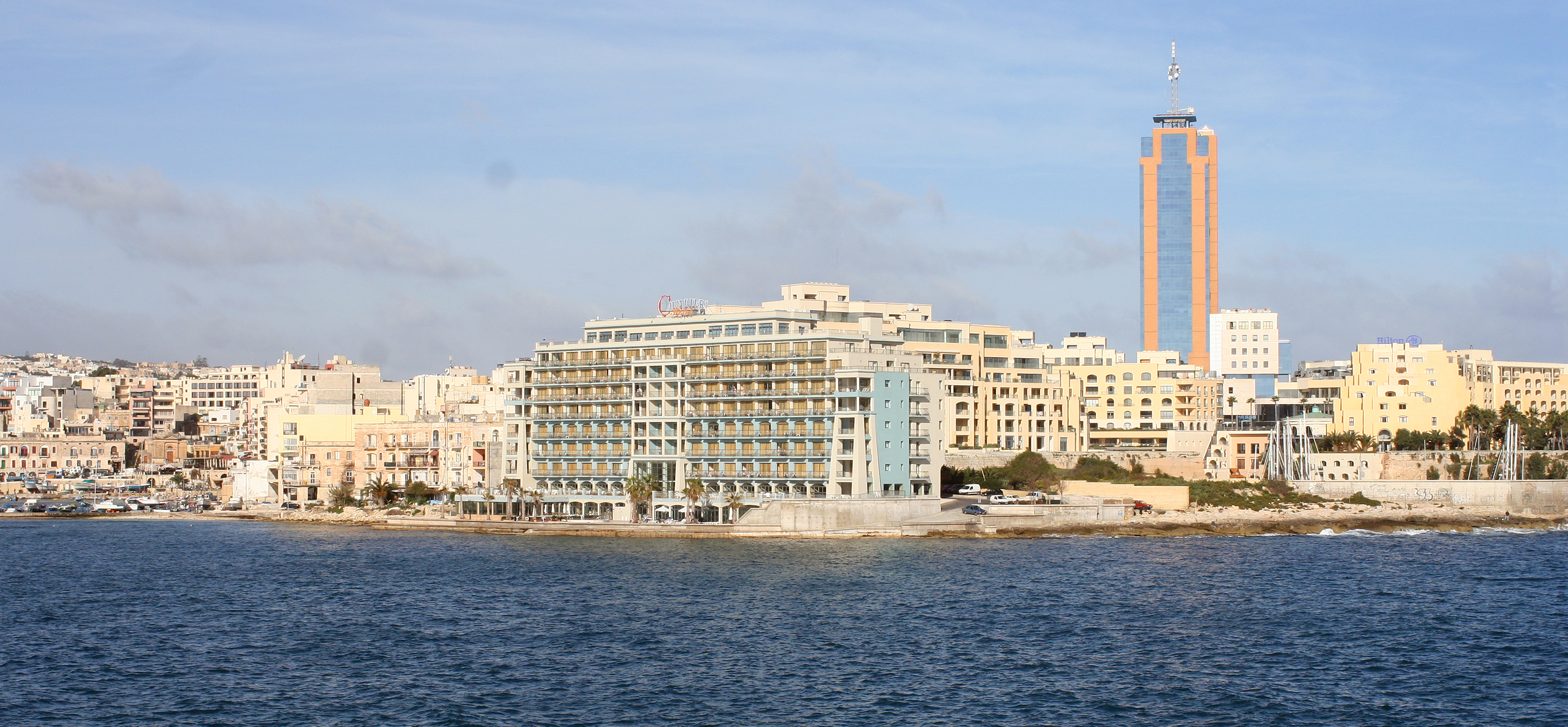
- St. Julian's skyline in 2007

- Flag Coat of arms
- Motto: Għal kull bżonn (For every need)
- Coordinates: 35°55′7″N 14°29′24″E
- Country: Malta
- Region: Eastern Region
- District: Northern Harbour District
- Borders: Gżira, Pembroke, San Ġwann, Sliema, Swieqi

Government
  - Mayor: Albert Buttigieg (PN)

Area
  - Total: 1.6 km^{2} (0.62 sq mi)

Population (Jul. 2024)
  - Total: 14,709
  - Density: 9,200/km^{2} (24,000/sq mi)
- Demonym(s): Ġiljaniż (m); Ġiljaniża (f), Ġiljaniżi (pl)
- Time zone: UTC+1 (CET)
  - Summer (DST): UTC+2 (CEST)
- Postal code: STJ
- Dialing code: 356
- ISO 3166 code: MT-48
- Patron saint: St. Julian; Our Lady of Mount Carmel
- Day of festa: Last Sunday of August; Last Sunday of July
- Website: Official website

Saint Julian's (Maltese: San Ġiljan) is a town in the Eastern Region of Malta. It is situated along the coast, north of the country's capital, Valletta. It is known for tourism-oriented businesses, such as hotels, restaurants and nightclubs which are centred mainly in an area known as Paceville. The population of St. Julian's was 14,709 in July 2024. This included 8.078 males and 6,631 females; 6,295 Maltese nationals and 8,614 foreign nationals.

== Etymology, feast and traditions ==
The town is named after its patron saint; Saint Julian the Hospitaller whereby he is the patron saint of hunters. Before the reform of the Calendar of Saints, the memorial to St Julian was on 27 January. Nowadays, it is celebrated on 12 February, although in Malta an additional feast, in the spirit of the many summer feasts around the island, is celebrated on the last Sunday of August.

A very particular competition connected with the town's feast is known as ġostra. This traditional competitive feat involves participants climbing and running as far as possible along a sloping greased pole which is suspended above the sea. The winner is the person to grab one of three flags dangling from the end of the pole, each flag representing a certain prize.

Another tradition connected with the feast of this locality is 'Musketterija. Starting in 1982, this tradition sees Hunters firing blank cartridges filled with black powder from the roof of the parish church as the statue of the patron saint is brought out of the church. Many say this tradition is in line with the history of the locality which used to be hunting grounds for the Knights of Malta.

== Location and areas ==
The town is located on Malta's east coast, north of Valletta and the neighbouring town of Sliema. It is subdivided into informal districts which are Paceville, Ta' Ġiorni, Tal-Għoqod and St Andrew's, as well as the regions surrounding St George's Bay, Spinola Bay, Balluta Bay, and Il-Qaliet cliffs. St Julian's is a tourist destination, especially popular during the summer months.

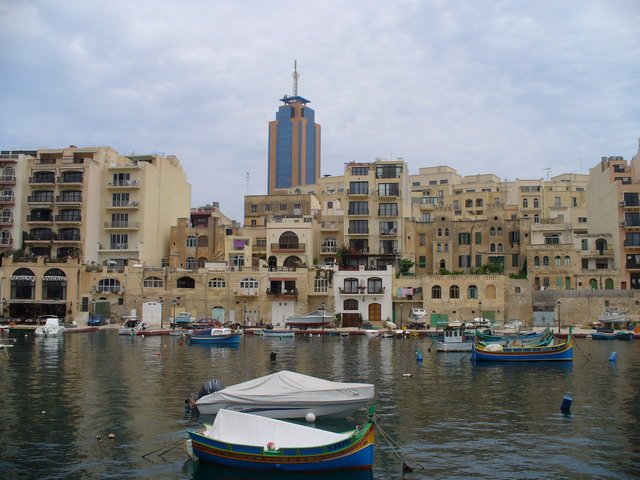
Portomaso Tower with Spinola Bay in the foreground

Malta's tallest building, the Mercury Tower, is located in St. Julian's, along with the island's previous tallest building, the Portomaso Business Tower.

=== History ===
==== Old parish church ====
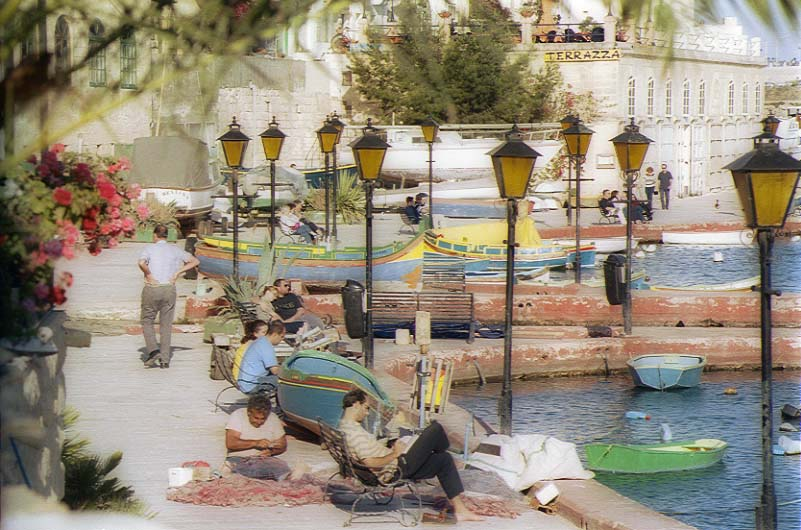
Part of the Spinola Bay area of San Ġiljan

The earliest documentary evidence of this church is of the pastoral visit of Bishop Tommaso Gargallo of 1601, which he says was built in 1580 and was dedicated to Saint Julian. In 1736, when Monsignor Alpheran de Bussan re-visited Saint Julian's, he noted that the locality was already known as Portus Sancti Juliani, meaning "St Julian's port". In 1854, the 600 or so residents of Saint Julian's appealed to the church authority, in order to make it a parish. The chapter at Birkirkara protested strongly against such an application and consequently the application was denied; but it was granted at reapplication in 1891. Dun Guzepp Scerri became the first parish priest.

The parish church was designed by Maltese architect Arturo Zammit and its first stone was laid in 1961. It was used for the first time in 1968 when it was still not fully built. The church welcomed Pope John Paul II on his first visit to Malta on 27 May 1990.

The Millenium Chapel designed by Maltese architect Richard England was inaugurated in 2000. It houses a meditation garden inaugurated in May 2018 as a refuge for contemplation and tranquility right in the heart of the entertainment Zone of Paceville. Built on the initiative and run by Fr Hilary Tagliaferro, this church is run by Augustinian clergy through the Millenium Chapel Foundation.

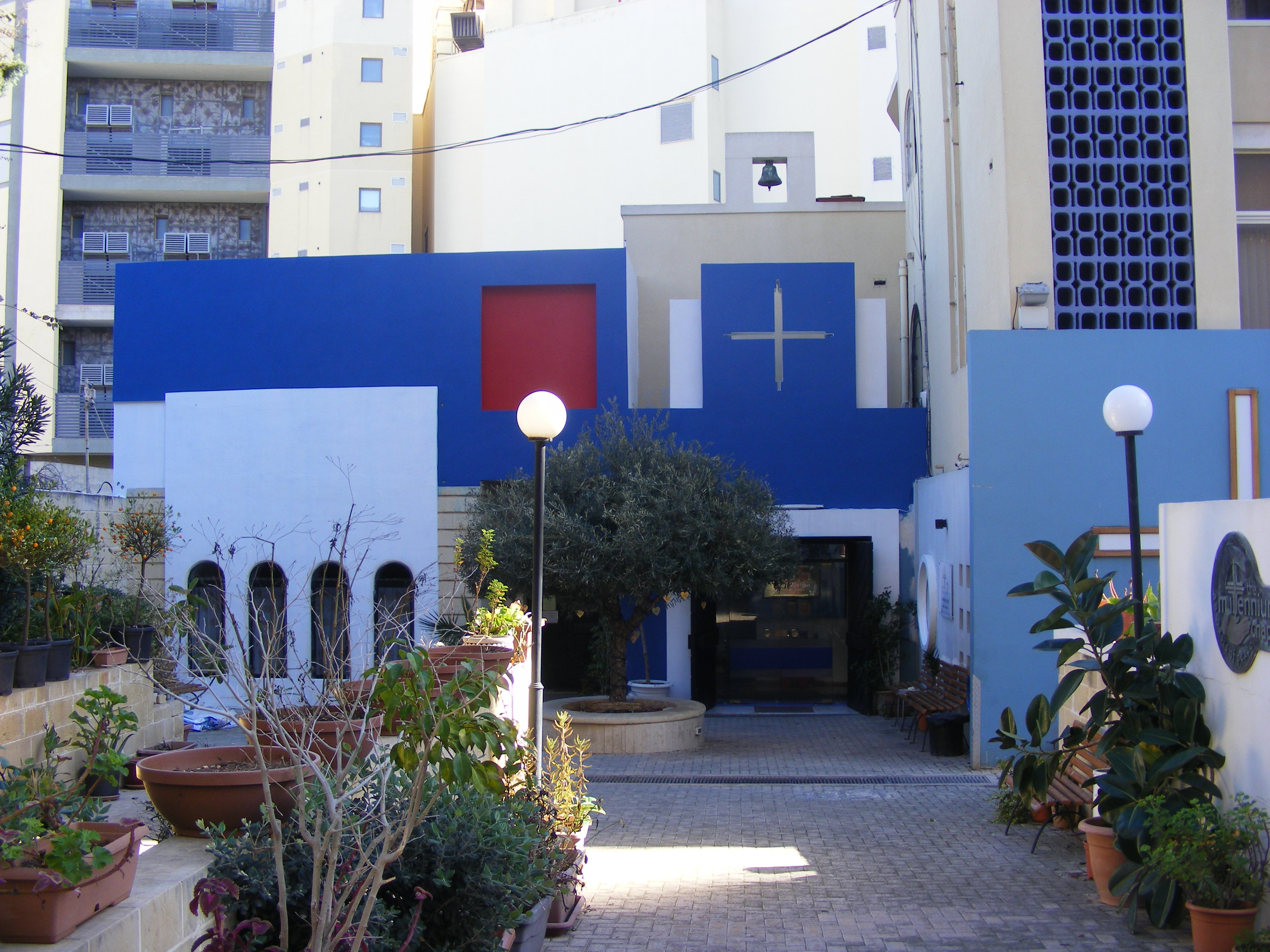
Millenium Chapel in Paceville

Until the nineteenth and early twentieth centuries, St. Julians was a very peaceful coastal town known for its Latin architecture such as the Spinola Palace and greenery surrounding it. Moreover, Spinola Bay was characterized by its fishermen and farmers dwelling the countryside.

It has seen one of the largest infrastructure developments on the island with many old houses being demolished to construct blocks of apartments. In 2020 plans to develop a tourist Ferry point within Balluta Bay have been met with public concern and protests by individuals, local council and NGOs.

==== Spinola Palace ====
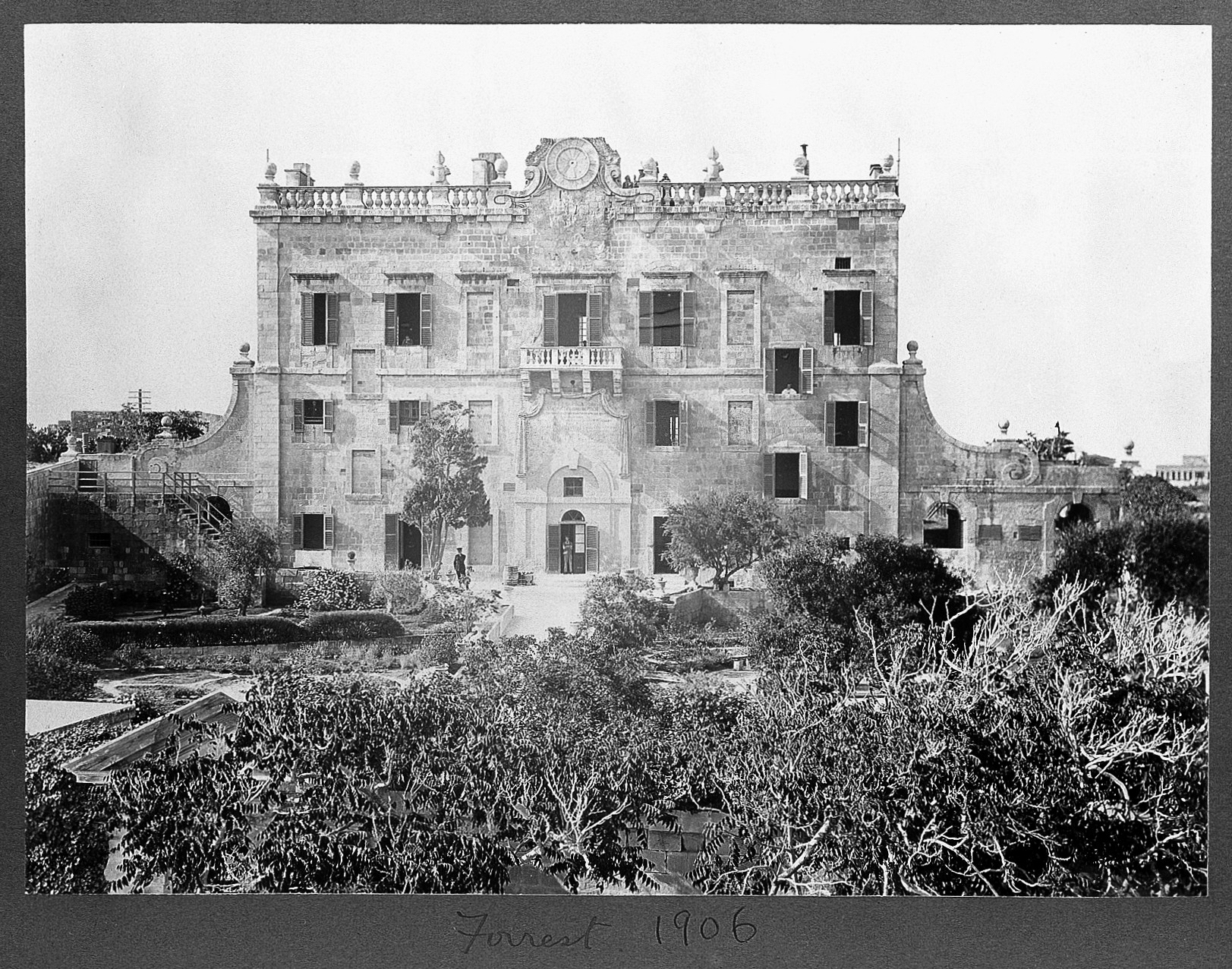
Spinola Palace in around 1906

Because of fear of attacks by Muslims, the northern coastal area remained undeveloped until the diminished attacks after the Great Siege of Malta in 1565. The building of Spinola Palace, coming as it does in 1688, is to be regarded as the stepping stone for the coastal reclamation of San Ġiljan. The palace, together with the surrounding gardens, was built by Fra Paolo Raffaele Spinola for the public entertainment as stated in the inscription above the portico. The palace was enlarged in 1733 through the efforts of Fra Giovanni Battista Spínola, successor to his uncle as rector and Curator of the Abbazia. During the French occupation of these islands in 1798, St Julians was the first town in Malta to be conquered by French troops led by General Claude Henri Vaubois who led the French forces into Spinola Bay.

== Notable places in St. Julian's ==
=== Bays ===
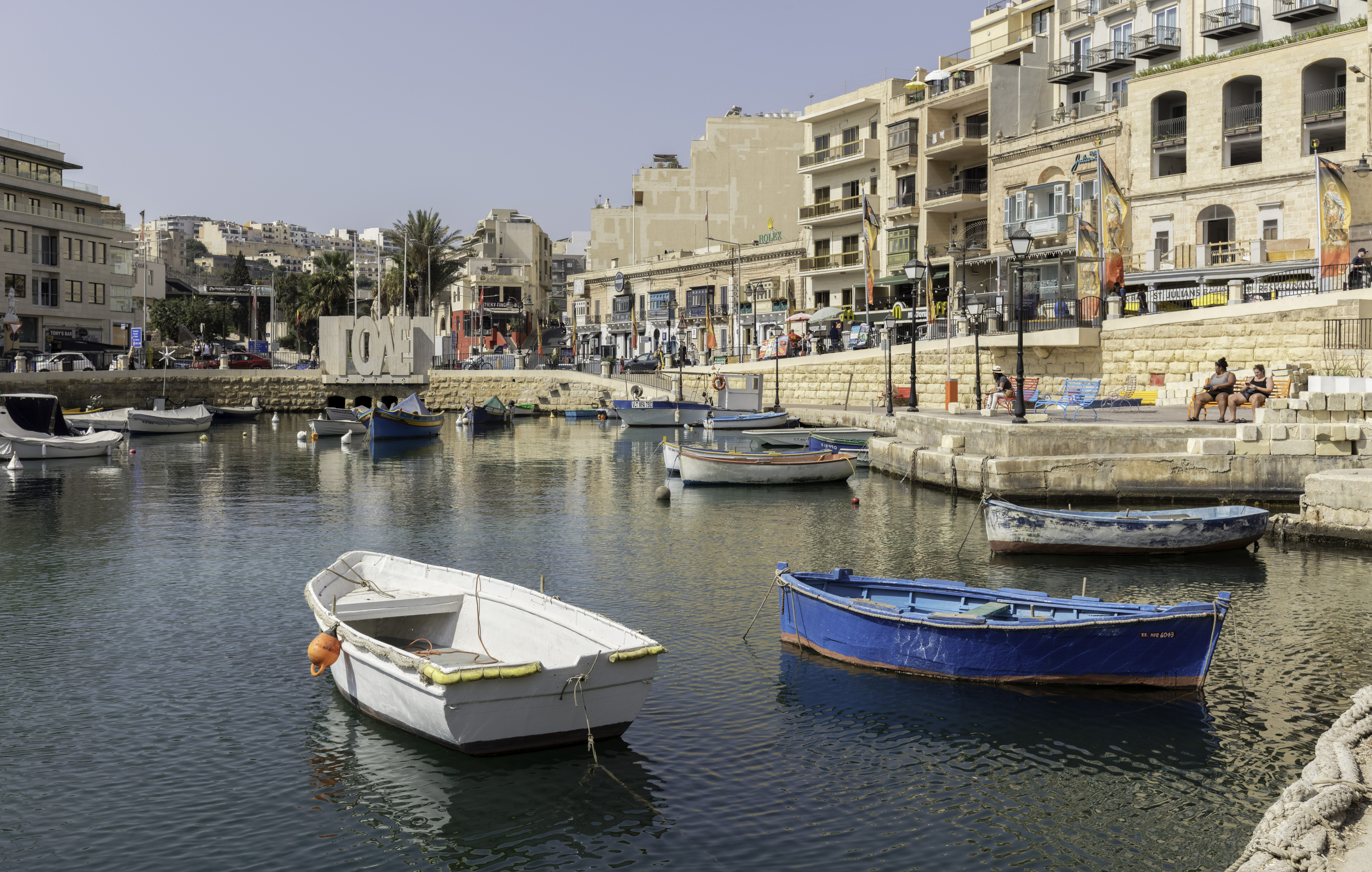
Spinola Bay

- Balluta Bay
- Spinola Bay

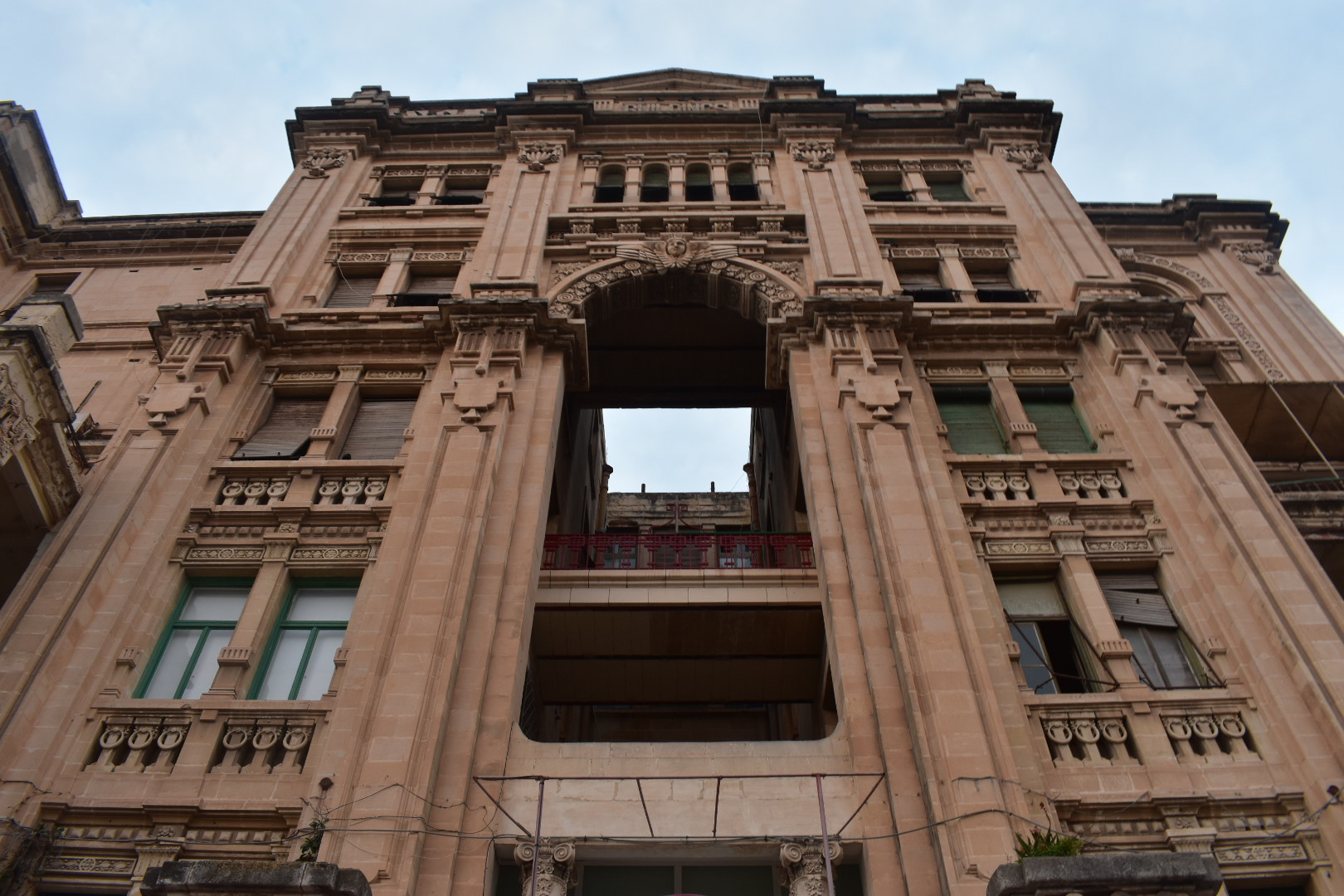
Balluta Buildings

- St. George's Bay
- St. Julian's Bay

=== Notable places and locations ===
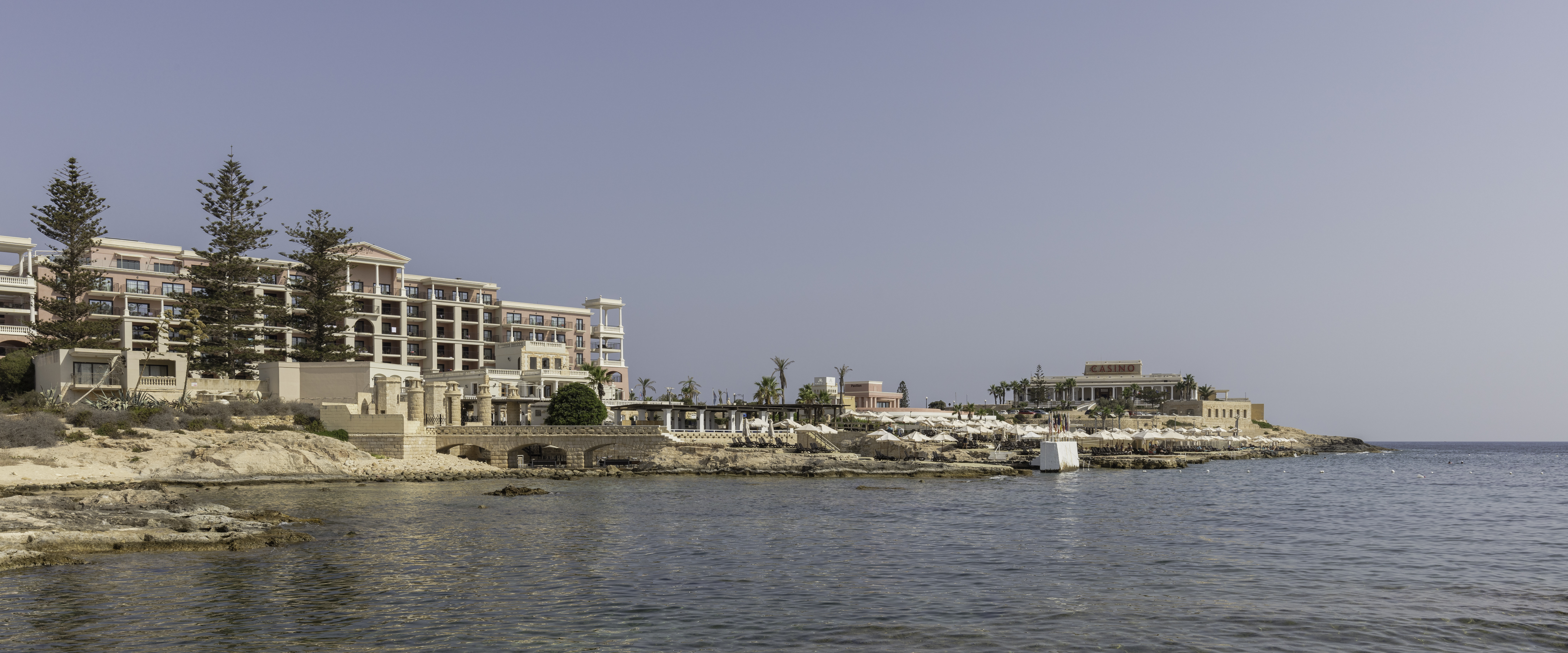
Palazzo Dragonara

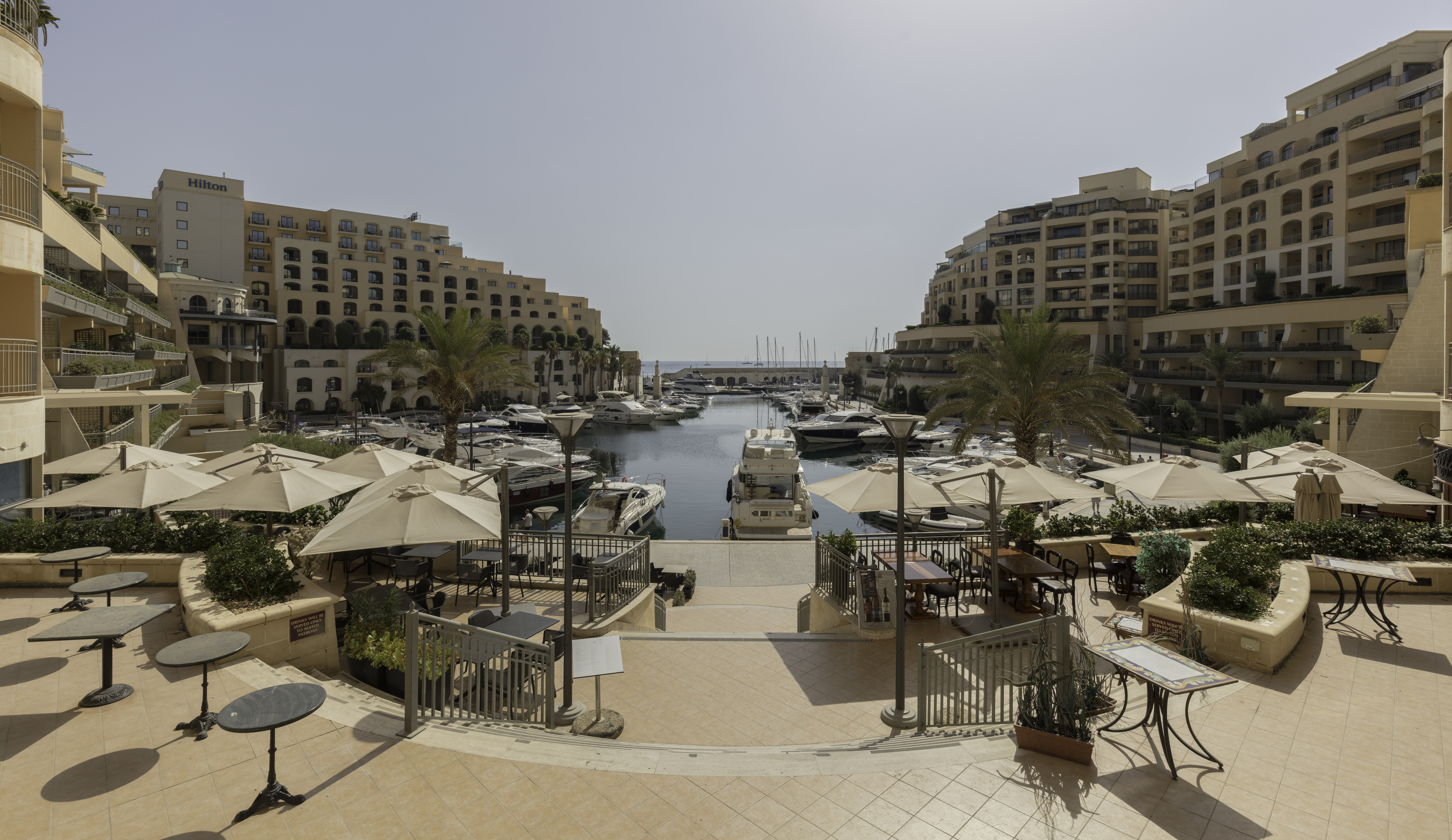
Marina Portomaso

- Balluta Buildings
- Palazzina Vincenti
- Dragonara Point
- Il-Qaliet
- Paceville
- Portomaso
- Mercury Tower
- Ta' Giorni
- Villa Rosa
- Wied Ħarq Ħamiem
- Wied tal-Balluta
- Love Statue by Richard England
- Villa Leoni
- Villa Priuli
- Villa Blanche
- Villa Cassar Torreggiani
- Saint George's Tower
- Monument of Ċensu Tabone

=== Religious monuments and churches ===
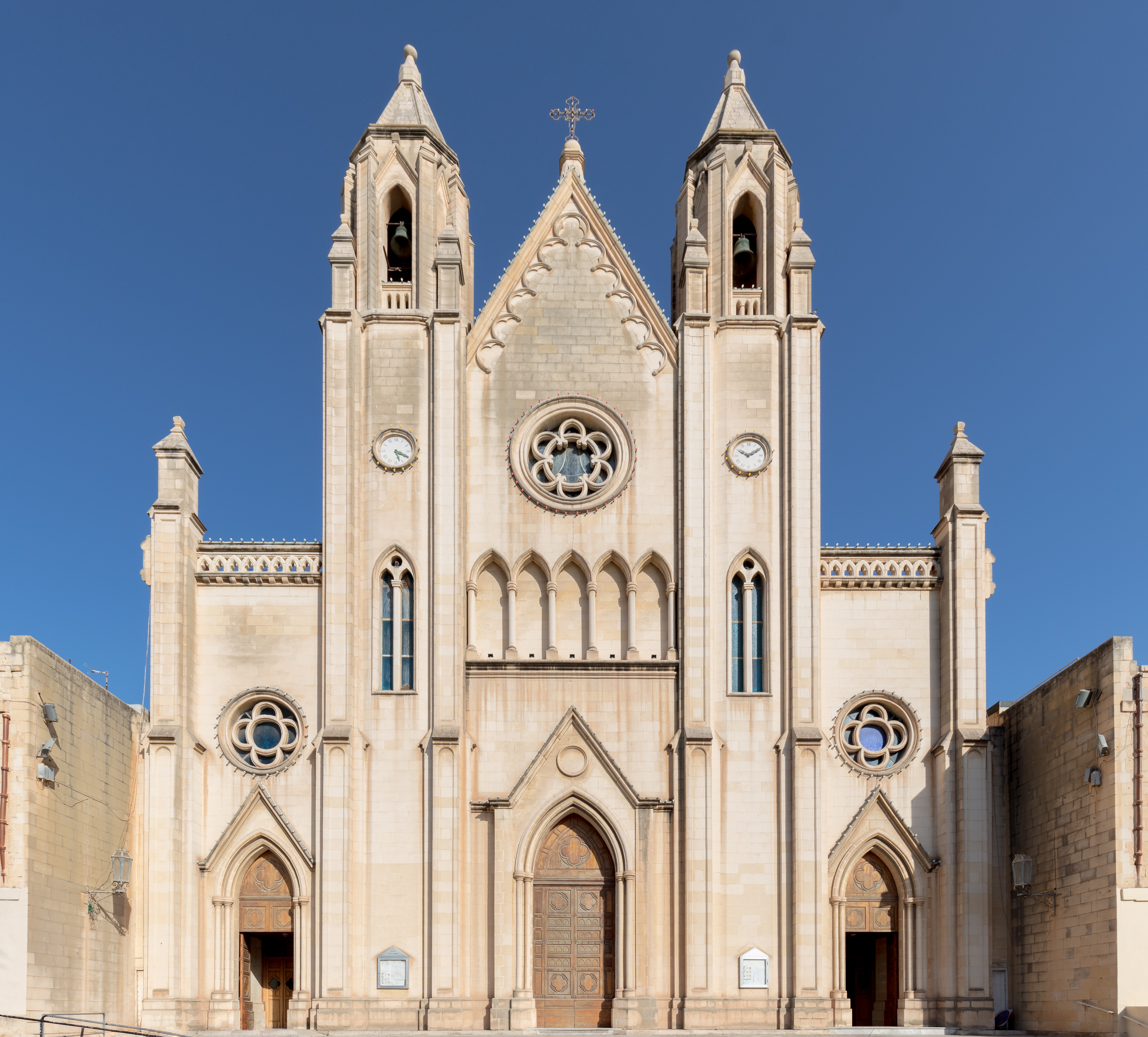
Our Lady of Mount Carmel

- Statue of St. Julians in Triq il-Kbira
- Statue of the Sacred Heart of Jesus in Xatt ta' Spinola
- Church of the Immaculate Conception in Triq San Gorg
- Statue of the Assumption in Triq Lapsi
- Niche of the Immaculate Conception in Telgha ta' Birkirkara
- Church of the Madonne of Good Council in Triq il-Knisja
- Church of Santa Rita
- Millenium Chapel
- Poor Clares' Monastery
- Our Lady of Mount Carmel (Carmelite Convent)
- Convent of the Sacred Heart of Jesus School

== Local council ==
The local council is made up of the following members:

- Guido Dalli (Mayor)
- Clayton Luke Mula (Deputy Mayor)
- Adrian Domenic Ellul
- Martin John Sultana
- Patricia Camilleri
- John Agius
- Rita Dimech Portelli
- Sean Gauci

== Notable events ==
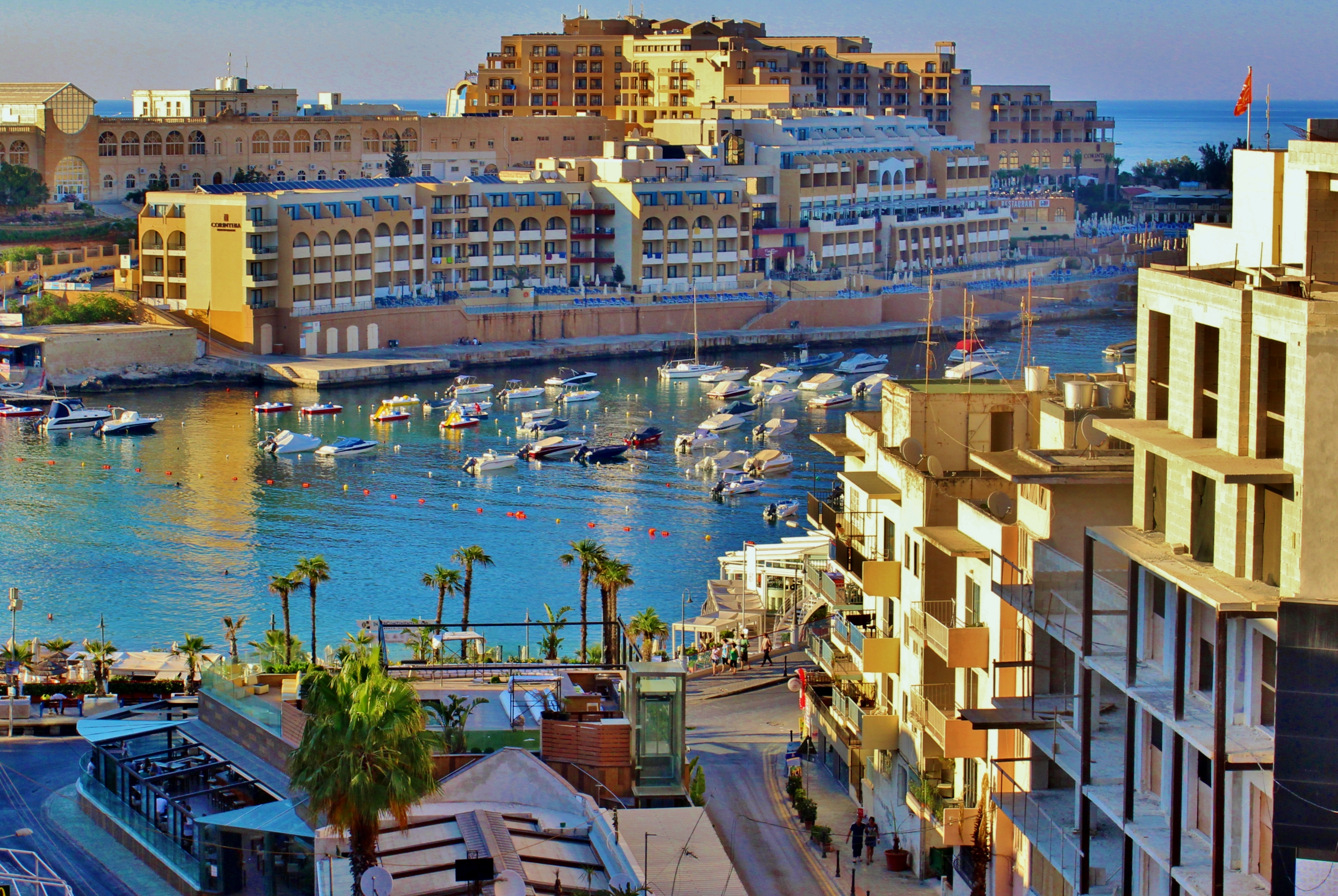
View of the port from the InterContinental Malta

- St Julian's feast is held on the last Sunday of August.
- Battle of Malta poker tournament
- Trafford Mersey Debrief

== Sports ==
St. Julian's is represented by the football team Melita F.C., formed in 1933. Their greatest honour in Maltese football to date is their 4–0 victory over neighbours Sliema Wanderers in the Maltese Cup final in 1939. In recent years, Melita have also competed in the Maltese Premier League and presently compete in the 3rd tier of Maltese football in the newly formed National Amateur League.

Waterpolo is the sport that brings people to this town. Neptunes WPSC, the local Waterpolo team has been in the top of Maltese Waterpolo league tables since it was established in 1929. The club enjoys well equipped training facilities situated along the beach front. Nearby San Giljan A.S.C has also been a strong player on the local scene with consecutive title wins as well as winners of the league in 2015.

Squash is also a common sport to play in St. Julian's.

Post football season beverage competitions are also very popular.

== Notable people ==
- Roberta Metsola, president of the European Parliament
- Emma Muscat, singer from one of Malta's wealthiest families, represented Malta in the Eurovision Song Contest 2022
- Roberta Bajada, writer

== See also ==
- Manwel Dimech Bridge
- St. Julian's Choral Group
