= Orpheus (disambiguation) =

Orpheus was a legendary figure in Greek mythology, chief among poets and musicians.

Orpheus may also refer to:

== Music and dance ==
- List of Orphean operas, several operas titled Orpheus or variants, including:
  - Orpheus (Telemann), a 1726 opera by Georg Philipp Telemann
- Orpheus (Liszt), an 1854 symphonic poem by Franz Liszt
- Orpheus (ballet), a 1948 ballet by Igor Stravinsky and George Balanchine
- Orpheus (band), a 1960s American rock band
- "Orpheus" (Ash song), 2004
- "Orpheus" (David Sylvian song), 1988
- "Orpheus", a song by Sara Bareilles from Amidst the Chaos, 2019
- "Orpheus", a 2025 song by MGK from Lost Americana
- Orpheus Chamber Orchestra, based in New York City
- Orpheus Foundation, which supports the Orpheus Sinfonia, based in London
- Orpheus Music, an American record label

== Film, television, and theater ==
- Orpheus (play), a 1926 play by Jean Cocteau
- Orpheus (film), a 1950 adaptation of the play, directed by Cocteau
- "Orpheus" (Angel), a 2003 television episode
- "Orpheus" (Stargate SG-1), a 2003 television episode
- Orpheus (Days of Our Lives), a character in the American soap opera Days of Our Lives
- Doctor Byron Orpheus, a character in the TV series The Venture Bros.
- Triana Orpheus, a character in the TV series The Venture Bros.
- Orpheus, a character in the 2006 off-Broadway musical Hadestown
- Lyra Orpheus, a character in the 1987 film Saint Seiya: The Movie

== Games and comics ==
- Orpheus (DC Comics), a fictional character
- Orpheus (role-playing game), published by White Wolf Game Studio
- Orpheus, the main character's persona in the video game Persona 3
- Orpheus, a character in the video game Hades
- Orpheus, a survivor and hunter in the video game Identity V
- Prince Orpheus, a character in the video game Baldur's Gate 3

== Places and structures ==
- Orpheus, Ohio, US
- Orpheus Gate, a geographical pass in Antarctica
- Orpheus Monument, a Roman-era monument in Slovenia

== Science and technology ==
- 3361 Orpheus, an Apollo asteroid
- Bristol Siddeley Orpheus, a turbojet engine
- Orpheus, a mockingbird genus, now a junior synonym of Mimus

== Ships ==
- Orpheus (ship), three commercial ships
- HMS Orpheus, several ships of the Royal Navy

== Other uses ==
- Orpheus Everts (1826–1903), American physician, writer
- Orpheus (magazine), Italian modernist journal between 1932 and 1934
- Orpheus – Oper und mehr, German magazine for music theatre
- Krewe of Orpheus, a New Orleans Mardi Gras krewe
- Orpheus Roye (born 1973), American professional football player
- Orpheus, a character from the Inkheart series by Cornelia Funke

== See also ==
- ORFEUS, the Orbiting Retrievable Far and Extreme Ultraviolet Spectrometer telescope, launched by the Space Shuttle mission 51
- Orpheum (disambiguation), a common name for theaters
- Orphée (disambiguation), the French spelling
- Orfeas (disambiguation), Ορφέας, the Greek spelling
- Orfeo (disambiguation), the Italian spelling

- Orfei, an Italian family name

- Orfeu (disambiguation), the Portuguese spelling
- Orfey (disambiguation), Орфей, the Russian spelling
- Orfeusz i Eurydyka, Polish poetry collection by Czesław Miłosz
