= Orfeo =

Orfeo is Italian for Orpheus, a figure in Greek mythology who was chief among poets and musicians.

== Opera ==
- L'Orfeo, a 1607 opera by Claudio Monteverdi
- La morte d'Orfeo, a 1619 opera by Stefano Landi
- Orfeo (Rossi), a 1647 opera by Luigi Rossi
- Orfeo (Sartorio), a 1672 opera by Antonio Sartorio
- La Descente d'Orphée aux enfers H.488 (1686), opera by Marc-Antoine Charpentier
- Orfeo ed Euridice, a 1762 opera by Christoph Willibald Gluck
- L'Orfeide, a 1925 opera by Gian Francesco Malipiero

== People ==
- Orfeo Vecchi (1551–1603), Italian composer
- Orfeo Boselli (1597–1667), Italian sculptor
- Orfeo Orfei (1836–1915), Italian painter
- Orfeo Angelucci (1912–1993), "contactee" who claimed to be in contact with extraterrestrials
- Orfeo Reda (1932–2025), Italian painter and artist

== Other ==
- Sir Orfeo, a Middle English narrative poem
- Orfeo (novel), a novel by Richard Powers
- Orfeo (film), a 1985 film by Claude Goretta
- Orfeo (record label), a German record company
- Orfeo (spider), genus of spiders
- Orfeo Programme, a planned European Space Agency mission
- Orfeo Superdomo, a sports arena in Argentina
- Orfeo toolbox, image processing software
- "Samba de Orfeu", song by jazz saxophonist Paul Desmond
- "Orfeo", song by Italian and French singer Dalida

== See also ==
- Orfei, an Italian family name
- Orpheus (disambiguation), the English and German spelling
- Orphée (disambiguation), the French spelling
- Orfeas (disambiguation), Ορφέας, the Greek spelling
- Orfeu (disambiguation), the Portuguese spelling
- Orfey (disambiguation), Орфей, the Russian spelling
