= New Orpheum Theatre =

New Orpheum Theatre or New Orpheum Theater may refer to:

- Orpheum Theatre (Champaign, Illinois), also known as "The New Orpheum", listed on the NRHP in Illinois
- New Orpheum Theatre (Sioux City, Iowa), listed on the NRHP in Iowa

== See also ==
- Orpheum (disambiguation)
