= Orpheum =

Orpheum is a name often used for theatres or other entertainment venues. It may refer to:

== Theatres ==
- Orpheum Circuit, a chain of vaudeville and movie theaters

=== Australia ===
- Hayden Orpheum Picture Palace, Cremorne, Sydney, New South Wales

=== Canada ===
- Orpheum (Vancouver), Vancouver, British Columbia

=== Germany ===
- Orpheum Dresden

=== Malta ===
- Orpheum Theatre (Malta)

=== United States ===
- Orpheum Theater (Flagstaff, Arizona)
- Orpheum Theatre (Phoenix, Arizona)
- Orpheum Theatre (Los Angeles), California
- Palace Theatre (Los Angeles), formerly Orpheum Theatre
- Orpheum Theatre (San Francisco), California
- Orpheum Theatre (Champaign, Illinois)
- Orpheum Theater (Galesburg) Illinois
- Orpheum Theater (Davenport), Davenport, Iowa
- Orpheum Theatre (Sioux City, Iowa)
- Orpheum Theatre (Wichita, Kansas)
- Orpheum Theater (New Orleans)
- Orpheum Theatre (Boston), Massachusetts
- Orpheum Theatre (New Bedford, Massachusetts)
- NorShor Theatre or Orpheum Theatre, Duluth, Minnesota
- Orpheum Theatre (Minneapolis), Minnesota
- Orpheum Theater (St. Louis), St. Louis, Missouri
- Orpheum Theatre (Omaha), Omaha, Nebraska
- Orpheum Theatre (Manhattan), New York, New York
- Orpheum Theater (Sioux Falls), South Dakota
- Orpheum Theatre (Memphis), Tennessee
- Orpheum Theatre (Green Bay, Wisconsin)
- Orpheum Theatre (Madison, Wisconsin)
- Moore's Orpheum Theatre, theater in Washington, D.C. in 1914

== Other uses ==
- Orpheum Children's Science Museum, a museum in Champaign, Illinois
- Orpheum Foundation for the Advancement of Young Soloists, a Swiss foundation
- The Orpheum, a surgical building at the Jersey City Medical Center

== See also ==
- Orpheus (disambiguation)
