= Joe Colombo (disambiguation) =

Joseph Colombo (1914–1978) was an American gangster and boss of the Colombo crime family.

Joe Colombo may also refer to:

- Joe Colombo (designer) (1930–1971), Italian industrial designer
- Joe Coulombe (1930–2020), American entrepreneur
- Joseph Colombo (architect) (died 1970), Maltese architect
