= Carlo Manché =

Maltese Roman Catholic parish priest

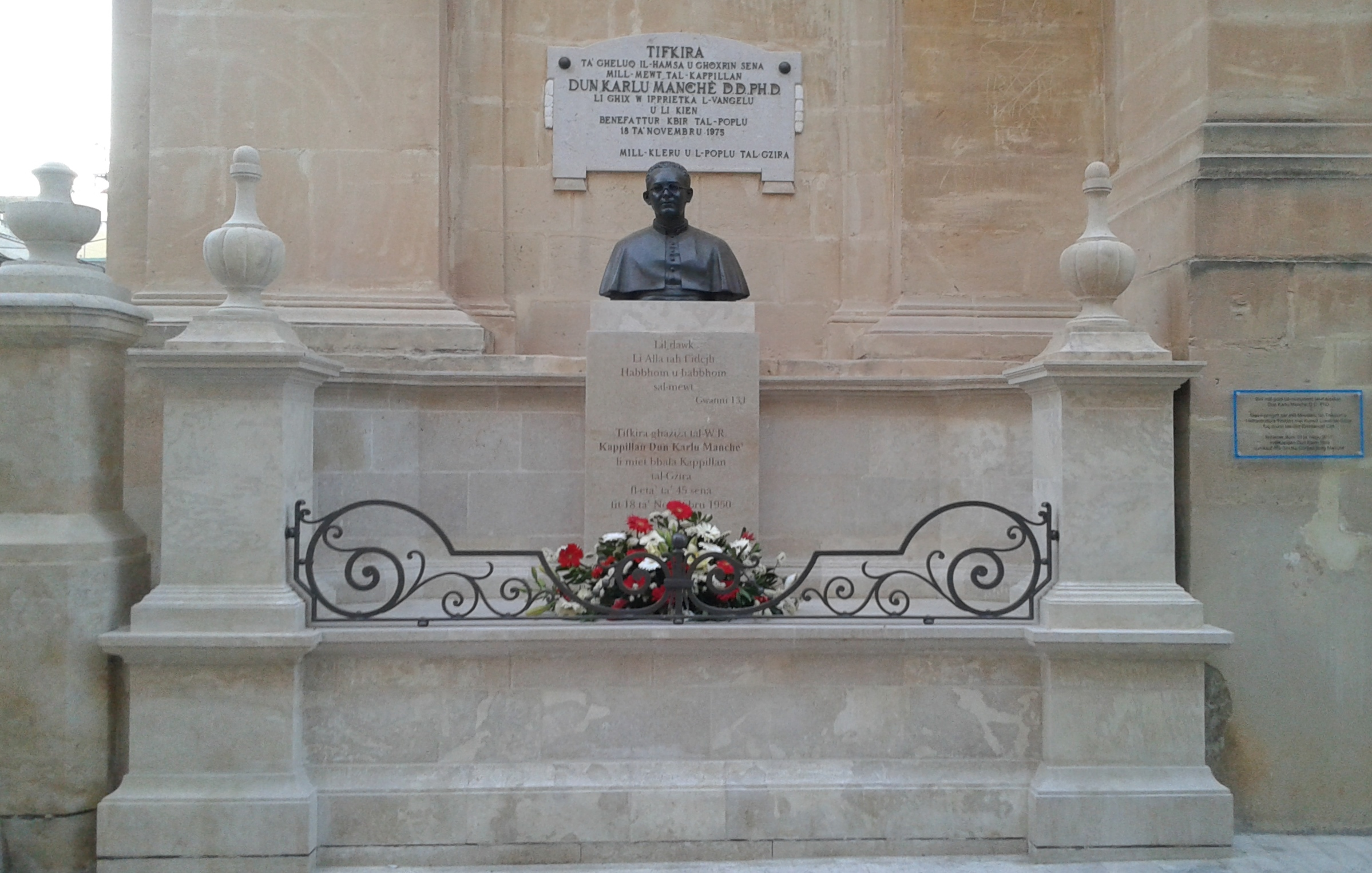
Carlo Manché monument adjacent to the Gżira Parish Church

Carlo Manché (1905–1950) was a Maltese Roman Catholic parish priest. He was born in Valletta, Malta, on 22 September 1905. He was one of seven children of surgeon Charles Manché, a lieutenant colonel in the British army, and his first wife Giuseppina Falzon. When Giuseppina died, Charles Manché married his second wife Lucrezia Vella, who bore him eight children.

Carlo Manché was ordained as a Roman Catholic priest on 22 September 1928. The next day, he celebrated his first mass at the Gżira Parish Church. With a flair for languages, Carlo could speak English, Italian, French and German. He also had an academic knowledge of Latin, Hebrew and Biblical Greek.

On 1 October 1928, Carlo Manché graduated in Theology and a Bachelor in Canon Law from the University of Malta. As Fr. Carlo came first in the course, he was awarded a scholarship with an overseas university of his choice. For two years Manché studied at the Gregorian University in Rome, from where he was conferred with a Doctor Of Philosophy degree.

Between 1935 and 1950 he was the parish priest of Gżira.

Historian Henry Frendo, in his book Europe and Empire: Culture, Politics and Identity in Malta and the Mediterranean, states that during World War II "Parish priest Manché helped his people not only with prayer, but with courageous action in aid of the victims and of his flock, who were fleeing from Gżira to various safer villages in the island. Fr Manché worked night and day, while like a true general he did not abandon the parish. He helped the homeless, the injured and sought food for the people, even serving in the commensal Victory Kitchens."

In Malta, during World War II, there was a sudden great demand for rock shelters. Soon, many voluntary organisations were formed to assist in the building of these shelters. "Probably the first organised group was at Gżira. On 20 January 1941 the Gżira-Msida District Committee got volunteers together. Men who had never done any work with pick and shovel, and working in relays, started digging into the rock to provide protection to the people of the district. The first neo-miners were the Rev. Manché, D.D. the Gżira Parish Priest, and Dr A.F. Colombo M.D."

"Manché changed his parish from a habitat of prostitution to a reputable place. He lived like one of the poorest of his parishioners".

Manché used to try to convince prostitutes to change their practice. This did not go down well with some pimps, and on one occasion he was severely beaten. One day a man went with a gun to his office, but luckily a certain Twanny Farrugia appeared at the office, and the man ran away. Manché refused to lodge a police report.

Carlo Manché died at the age of 45 on 18 November 1950, in Gżira. Thousands of people, coming from different backgrounds, attended his funeral. This was a sign of the respect and admiration people had for him.

Carlo Manché left no belongings, except his bed, his mattress and pillows, some books, one pair of torn shoes and a watch. "As all he had he distributed to the poor or for the needs of the parish. With him he took to heaven thousands and thousands of good works, for which God rewarded him," wrote Monsignor Arturo Bonnici in a booklet published by Christus Rex of the Society for the Clergy.

Charles Vella wrote that "Had the Church carried out a study of the heroic virtues of this priest he would by now be declared a Servant of God".

On 10 May 2017 the community of Gżira inaugurated the embellishment of a 1975 plaque, and a bust of Carlo Manché erected in 2000, adjacent to the Gżira Parish Church. In the 1950s, the street where this monument is located, previously known as Oratory Street, was renamed after Carlo Manché.

On 14 December 2022 at the Gżira Parish Church a book about the life of Dun Carlo was launched. The book entitled " Dun Carlo Manché-Fi Kliem Niesu" has been edited by Tony Micallef. It contains first-hand experiences about the life and works of Dun Carlo by people who knew him. These include friends, parishioners and even members of Dun Carlo's family.

Conrad Borg-Manché, a former mayor of Gżira, is Dun Carlo's grandnephew.
