= Deo optimo maximo =

Latin phrase

Deo Opt. Max. abbreviation followed by an inscription, on the doorway of the Castellania, Valletta

Deo optimo maximo, often abbreviated D.O.M. or Deo Opt. Max., is a Latin phrase which means "to the greatest and best god", or "to God, most good, most great". It was originally used as a formula in the Ancient Roman religion, addressed to Jupiter.

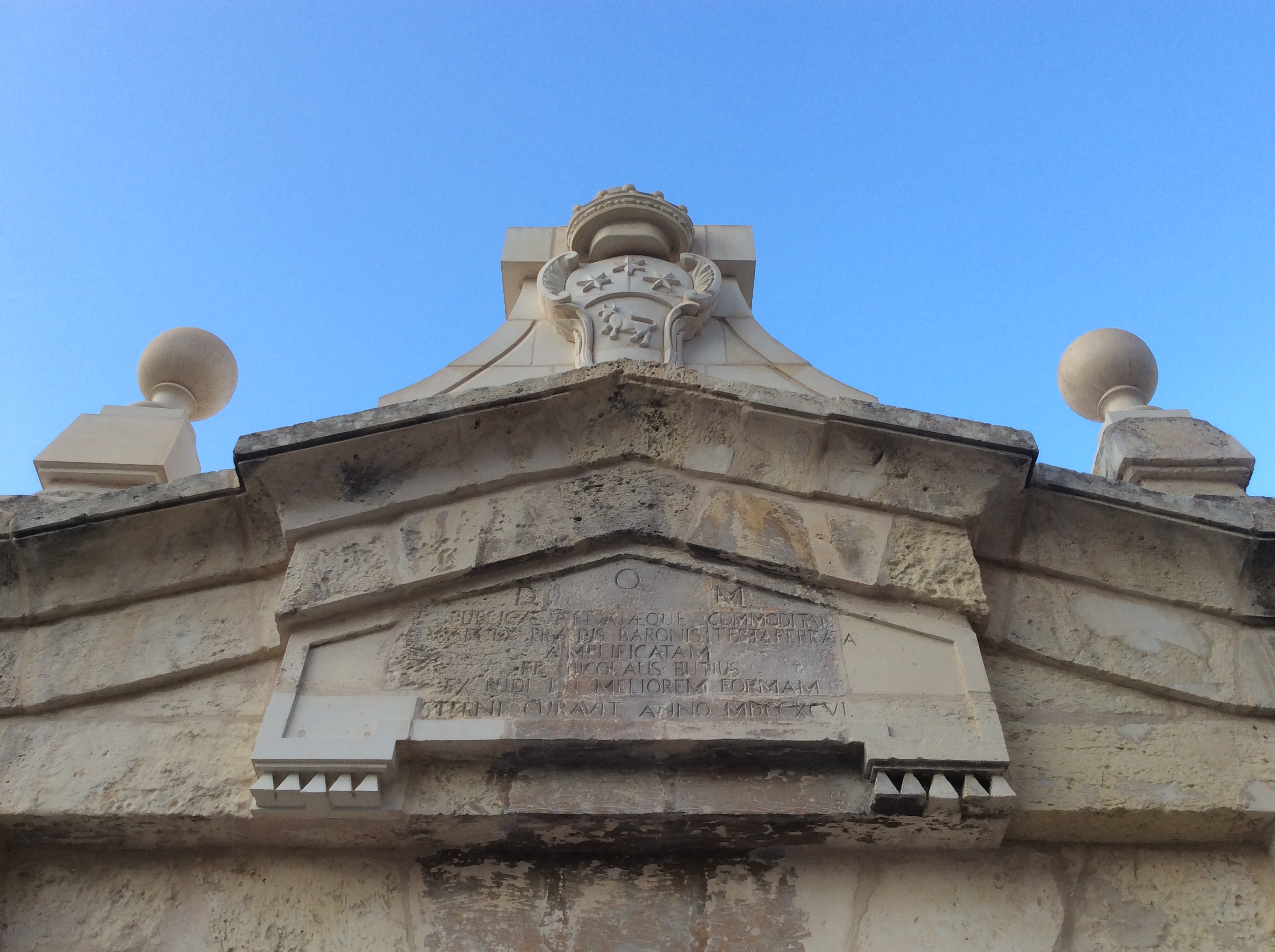
D. O. M. abbreviation followed by an inscription, on the Fawwara Gate, Gżira

Its usage while the Roman Empire was a polytheistic state referred to Jupiter, the chief god of the Roman pantheon polytheists: Iovi Optimo Maximo (I.O.M.). When the Roman Empire adopted monotheism in the form of Christianity as the state religion, the phrase was used in reference to the Christian God. Its use continued long after the fall of the Roman Empire as Latin remained the ecclesiastical and scholarly language in the West.

Thus the phrase, or its abbreviation, can be found on many Renaissance-era churches and other buildings, especially over sarcophagi, particularly in Italy and Malta.

It is also inscribed on bottles of Bénédictine liqueur.

== See also ==
- List of Latin phrases
- Takbir
