= Muscats Motors =

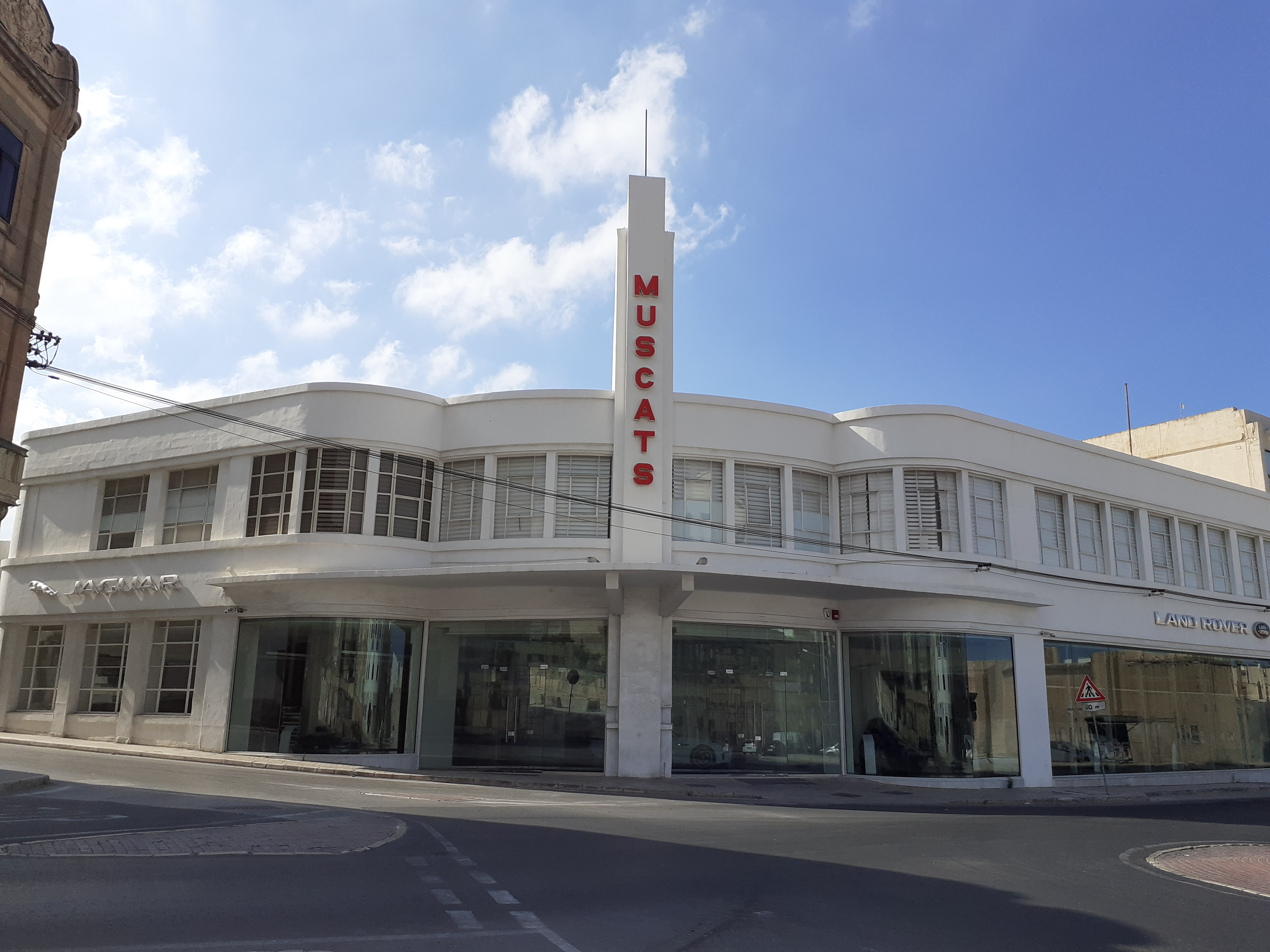
- Muscats Motors showroom

General information
- Status: Intact
- Type: Showroom
- Architectural style: Streamline Moderne
- Location: Gżira, Malta
- Coordinates: 35°54′05.3″N 14°29′28.5″E
- Completed: c. 1945
- Client: Muscats Motors
- Owner: Muscats Motors

Design and construction
- Architect(s): Joseph Colombo

Website
- www.muscatsmotors.com.mt

The Muscats Motors showroom, belonging to a car dealership of the same name, is a building located in Gżira, Malta. It was designed by Joseph Colombo in the Streamline Moderne style, and it is the only building of that style in Malta. It was constructed in around 1945 on the site of an earlier garage which had been destroyed in World War II. Today, the building is in good condition and it still serves its original purpose as a showroom.

== History ==
The Muscats Motors showroom stands on the site of the Muscat Garage, which was built by the Muscat family in 1934. This was designed by the architect Silvio Mercieca and it was built in a restrained form of Art Deco. In World War II, the building was used as a service and repair workshop for British military vehicles and equipment, including Supermarine Spitfire engines. It was targeted by German and Italian aerial bombardment, taking a direct hit and causing severe damage.

The Muscats Motors company was founded in 1943–44. The present building was constructed after the war, to designs of architect Joseph Colombo. It was built in a short period of time, being completed in around 1945.

The building still stands and it is in good condition, still serving its original purpose. Muscats Motors now forms part of the Mizzi Organisation, but it retained its original name. The building was scheduled as a Grade 2 property in 2012.

== Architecture ==
The Muscats Motors showroom was built in an elegant form of late Art Deco, and it has been described as the only true example of Streamline Moderne in Malta. This architectural style never gained popularity on the islands.

The showroom is also said to be "possibly the best example of commercial or retail modern architecture in the Maltese Islands." Its architecture has been compared to the Hoover Building and other buildings in Britain or the British colonies in Africa. The building has a flowing form and a smooth finish, with horizontal lines running along the entire façade, and rounded edges and corner windows. Its main feature is a clock tower in the centre of the façade (although the clock itself has been removed). The building is considered as an Industrial Heritage by the SCH.

== See also ==
- Fawwara Gate: rental agreement of the land where Muscats Motors stands states that the company ought to maintain the historic arch on site.
- Wembley ice-cream factory, nearby on the same street
- Metropolis Towers, being constructed in front of it on the site of the former Mamo Garage (Mira building)
