= Wembley ice-cream factory =

Wembley ice cream factory
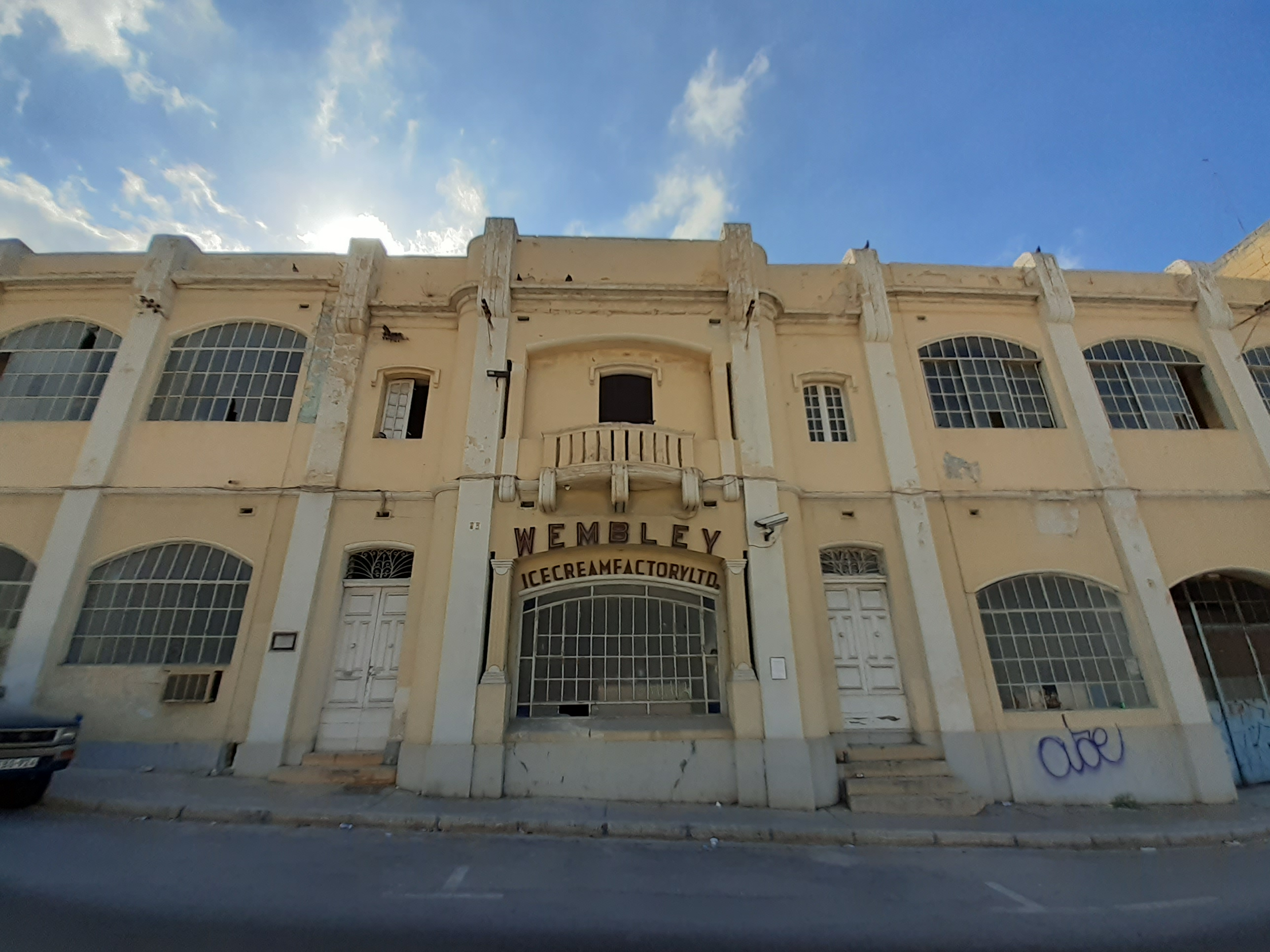
- Interactive map of the Wembley ice cream factory area

General information
- Status: Intact
- Type: Factory
- Architectural style: Art Deco style
- Location: Gżira, Malta, Triq D'Argens
- Coordinates: 35°54′18″N 14°29′36″E
- Completed: 1937
- Owner: Wembley Ice Cream Factory Limited

Technical details
- Floor count: 2

Design and construction
- Architect: Antonio Grech Dimech

The Wembley ice-cream factory in Triq D'Argens, Gżira, Malta was completed in 1937 by architect Antonio Grech Dimech.

It was built for industrialist Luke V. Gauci, who in 1937 introduced pasteurized and pre-packed ice-cream in Malta under the brand name of Wembleys.

Edward Said described the factory as one of “the best examples of pre-war industrial architecture in Malta” due to the symmetrical façade which includes subtle features reflecting the eclectic style used in dwellings at the time. The pilasters which divide the façade are expressed in the Art Deco style, “give a sense of haute verticality to the squat two-storey building”. It stands very close to the iconic Muscats Motors building and across from the demolished Mira building (excavated to be developed as Metropolis high-rise). Said had called on the PA to schedule the building and protect it from suffering the same fate.

The Wembley ice-cream factory is on the Planning Authority's waiting-list of properties awaiting a decision on scheduling.

In March 2019 the Planning Authority accepted a redevelopment plan by Emil Bonello Ghio and architect Ray Demicoli into a seven-storey office block (with four underground parking levels). This was a downscaled revision of an earlier 18-floor high-rise application. The Planning Authority recommended a simpler design, with a distinct extension and no central element. The current façade will be dismantled and relocated to the centre of the new site.

== See also ==
- Muscats Motors
- M-Towers, being built in front of it

Media related to Wembley ice-cream factory at Wikimedia Commons
