= Orfeu (disambiguation) =

Orfeu (or Orpheu) is the Portuguese for Orpheus, a legendary figure in Greek mythology, chief among poets and musicians.

Orfeu may refer to:

- Orfeu da Conceição, a 1956 Portuguese musical by Vinicius de Moraes
- Orfeu Negro (Black Orpheus), a 1959 French/Italian/Brazilian film based on the musical
- Orfeu, a 1999 Brazilian film, also based on the musical
- Orfeu (album)

Orfeu is also a name:

- Orfeu Bertolami, born 1959, Brazilian physicist

Orpheu may refer to:

- Orpheu, Portuguese art magazine, 1915, put out by the Geração de Orpheu

== See also ==
- Orpheus (disambiguation), the English and German spelling
- Orphée (disambiguation), the French spelling
- Orfeas (disambiguation), Ορφέας, the Greek spelling
- Orfeo (disambiguation), the Italian spelling
- Orfey (disambiguation), Орфей, the Russian spelling
