= Orfeas (disambiguation) =

Orfeas, Ορφέας, is the Greek for Orpheus, a legendary figure in Greek mythology, chief among poets and musicians.

Orfeas may refer to:

== Football clubs ==
- Orfeas Nicosia, a Cypriot football club
- Orfeas Elefteroupoli F.C., a Greek football club
- A.P.O. Orfeas, a Greek football club

== People ==
- Orfeas Tzanetopoulos, 1967–74 mayor of Egaleo, Greece

== Miscellaneous ==
- Orfeas, a former Greek municipal unit
- Orfeas (album), 2011 album retelling the Orpheus legend

== See also ==
- Orpheus (disambiguation), the English and German spelling
- Orphée (disambiguation), the French spelling
- Orfeo (disambiguation), the Italian spelling
- Orfeu (disambiguation), the Portuguese spelling
- Orfey (disambiguation), Орфей, the Russian spelling
