= Orphée (disambiguation) =

Orphée is the French for Orpheus, a legendary figure in Greek mythology, chief among poets and musicians.

Orphée also may refer to:

== Music ==
- La descente d'Orphée aux enfers H 488, a 1680s opera by Marc-Antoine Charpentier
- Orphée (Louis Lully), a 1690 opera
- Orphée aux enfers, Orpheus in the Underworld, a Jacques Offenbach operetta
- Orphée et Eurydice, the French adaptation of Gluck's opera Orfeo ed Euridice
- Orphée, part of Philip Glass's opera adaptations of the Cocteau trilogy
- "Orphée", 2011 song by Mamoru Miyano
- Orphée (album), a 2016 album by composer Jóhann Jóhannsson

== Stage and film ==
- Orphée, a 1926 French play by Jean Cocteau, known in English as Orpheus (play)
- The Orphic Trilogy, three French films by Jean Cocteau, including

- Orphée, 1950, known in English as Orpheus (film)
- Le testament d'Orphée, 1960, known in English as Testament of Orpheus

== Literature ==
- "Orphee", a Neil Gaiman short story, in A Little Gold Book of Ghastly Stuff.

== Anime and manga ==
- Studio Orphee, Yōsuke Kuroda's anime studio
- Lyra Orphée, a Silver Saint from the manga Saint Seiya

== Ships ==
- French submarine Orphée (Q163), a French Navy submarine commissioned in 1933 and discarded in 1946

== See also ==
- Orpheus (disambiguation), the English and German spelling
- Orfeas (disambiguation), Ορφέας, the Greek spelling
- Orfeo (disambiguation), the Italian spelling
- Orfeu (disambiguation), the Portuguese spelling
- Orfey (disambiguation), Орфей, the Russian spelling
