= Orpheus (ship) =

Several ships have borne the name Orpheus after Orpheus, an Ancient Greek musician, poet and prophet:

- Orpheus (1794 ship) was launched at Chester in 1794. She made two voyages for the British East India Company (EIC). She also served briefly as a transport in two military campaigns, and traded with the West and East Indies. She was last listed in 1838 but may well have been sold for breaking up in 1828.
- Orpheus (1818 ship) was launched in 1818 and wrecked in 1827
- MV Munster (1947) was renamed Orpheus c.1970

== See also ==
- HMS Orpheus
