= Ivan De Battista =

Maltese actor, director, and singer

- Born: Ivan De Battista; 13 September 1977 (age 48); Gżira, Malta
- Occupations: Actor, director, singer, poet and lyricist
- Years active: 1984 –
- Spouse(s): Simone De Battista (m. 2000–); 2 children

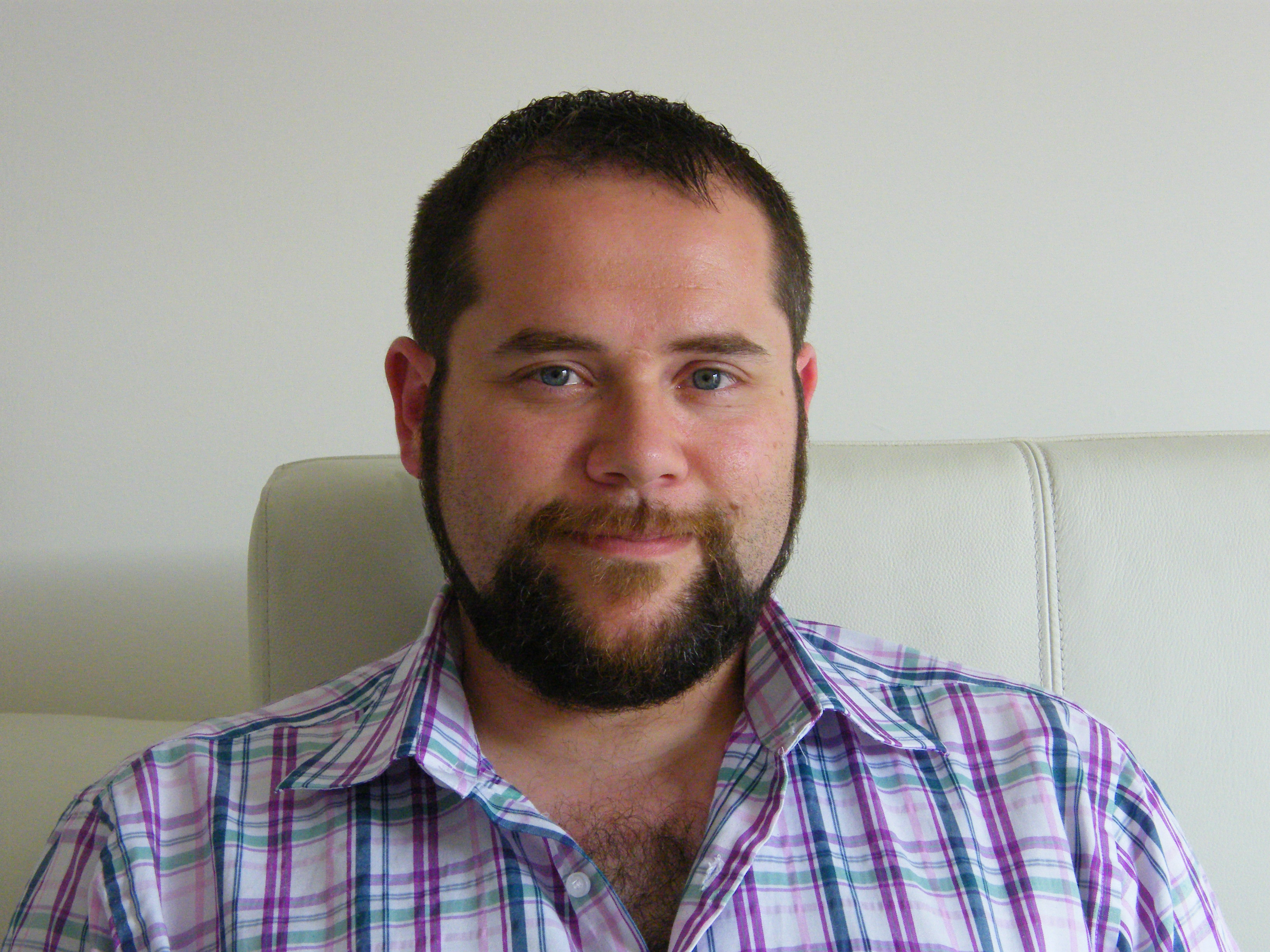

Ivan De Battista (born 13 September 1977) is a Maltese actor, director, author, and poet/lyricist.
