= Silvio Mercieca =

Maltese architect (1888–1954)

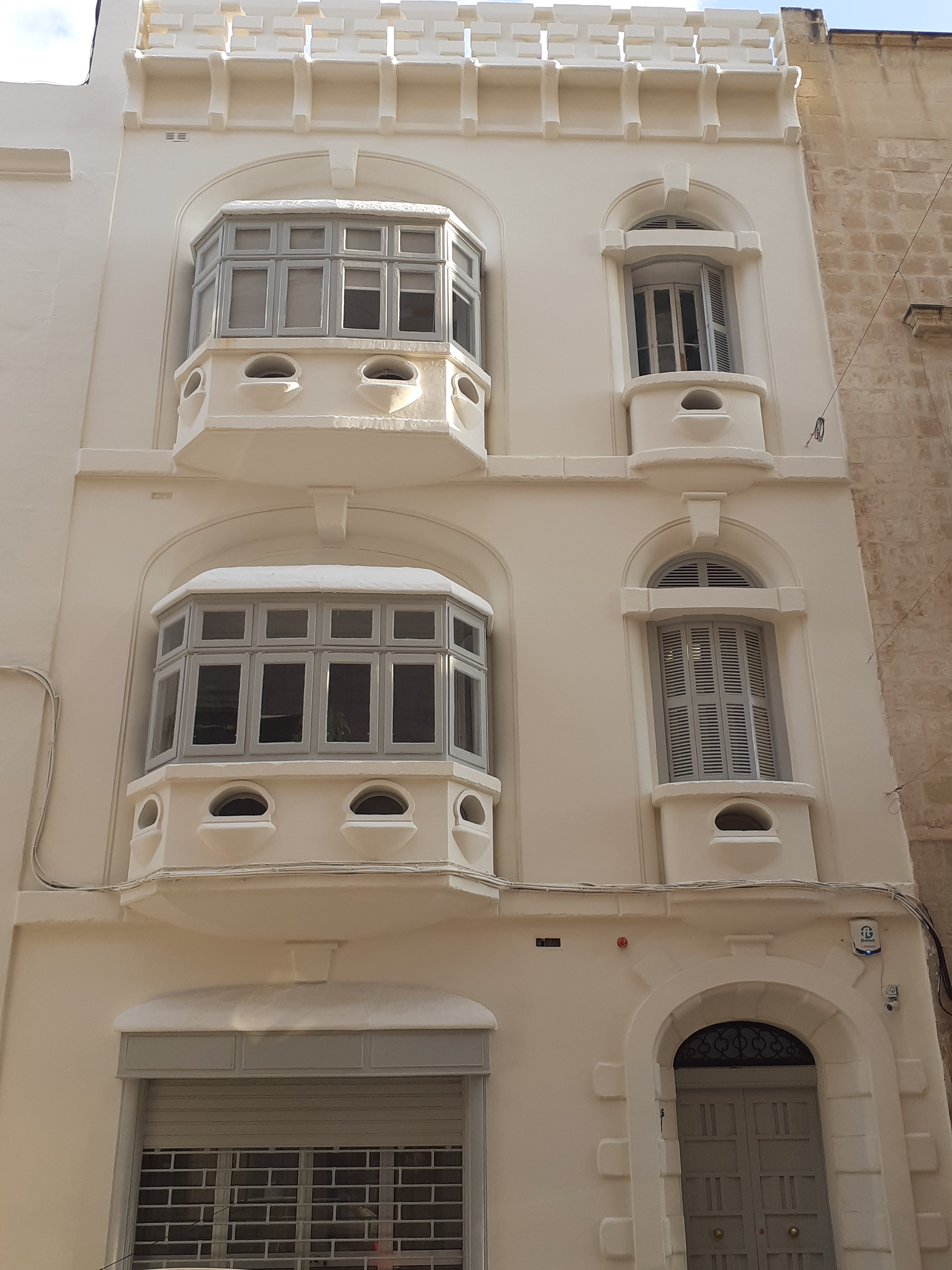
Townhouse in Old Bakery St 176, Valletta

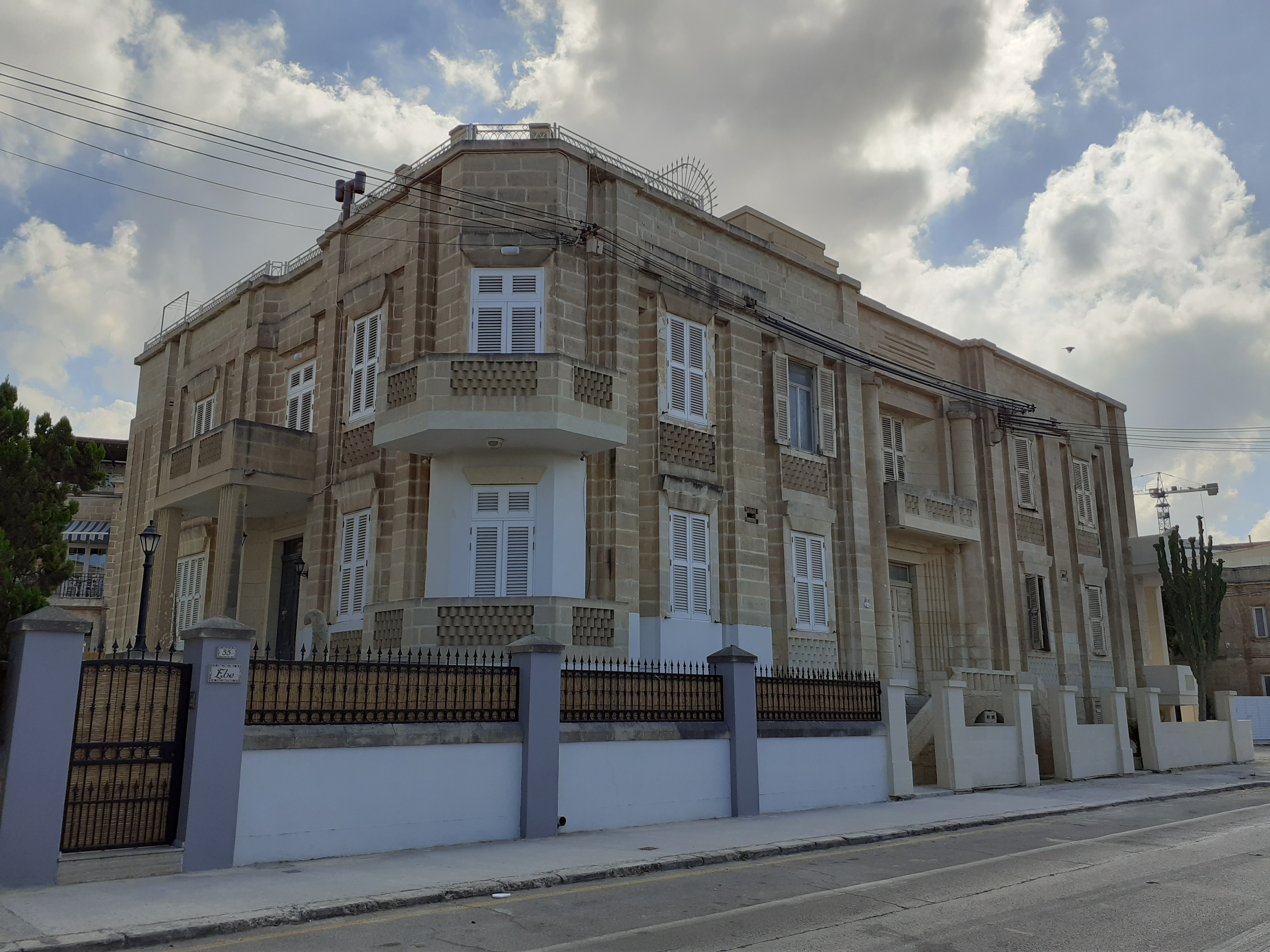
Villa Cloe, Ta' Xbiex

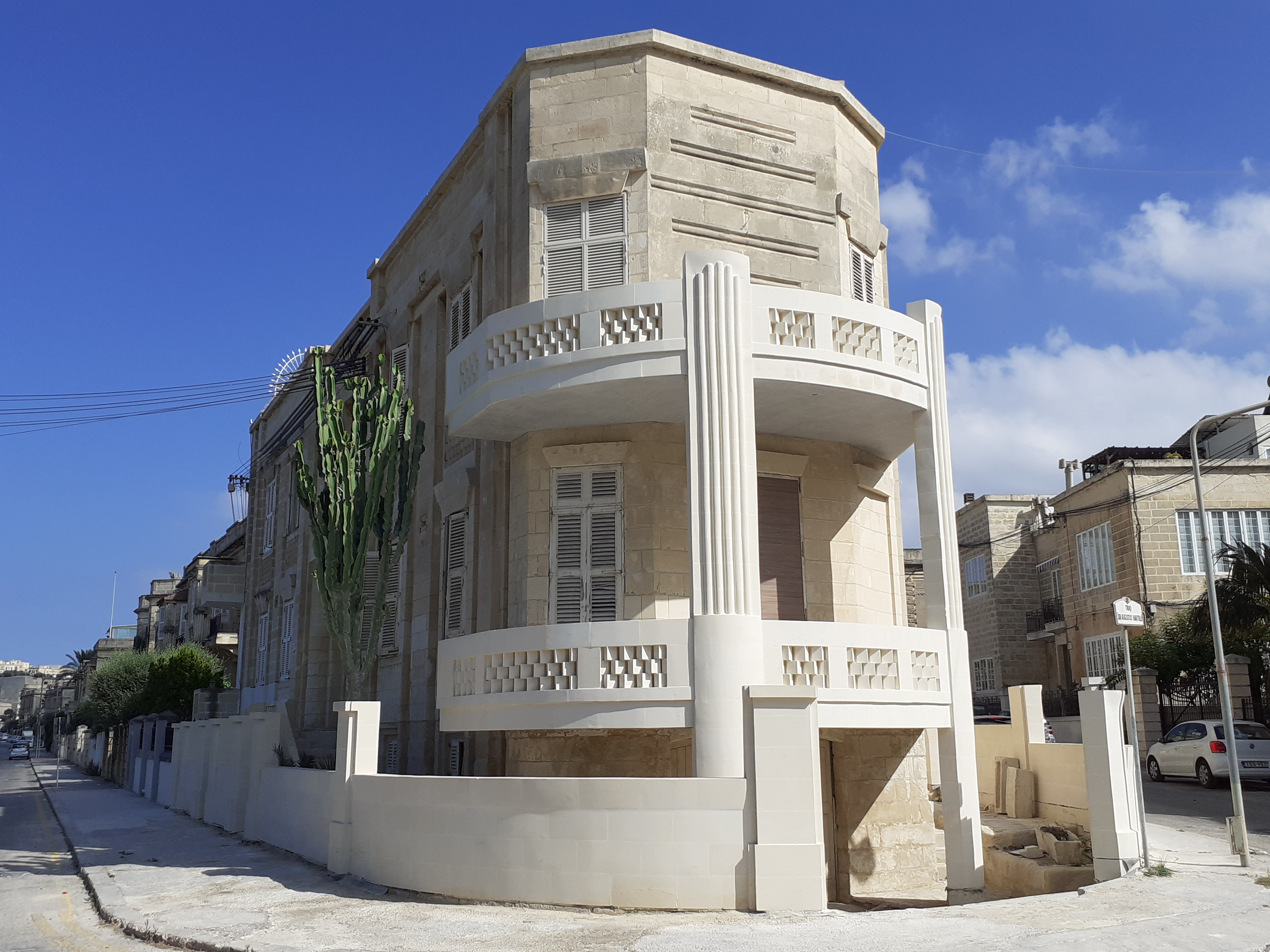
Villa Cloe, Ta' Xbiex

Silvio Mercieca (1888–1954) was a Maltese architect.

Mercieca is deemed to have started as an apprentice to Andrea Vassallo.

Mercieca authored a townhouse in Old Bakery Street, Valletta, which according to Mark G. Muscat "was fairly avant-garde for the time when it was built, and it is probably the only example of its kind in Valletta. It may be described as a combination of the Art Nouveau and Art Deco styles. The details of the balcony is particularly interesting, as indeed is the oversize frieze-like parapet wall that tops the façade."

According to Edward Said, Mercieca "designed buildings in his own style and also developed the Maltese balcony. He took inspiration from Gaudi and the Italian Stile Littorio. Some of his notable designs were [the original 1934 design of the] Muscat's car showrooms situated in Rue D'Argens, three historic townhouses with balconies in Hughes Hallet Street in Tigné, and houses in Isouard Street and St. Ignatius Street in Sliema. Mark G. Muscat debates whether the latter, Villa San Remo at St.Ignatius Junction, Sliema, may be attributed to Mercieca in the absence of documentation, or whether it was merely "designed by somebody who simply imitated the house in Old Bakery Street, Valletta".

Mercieca also authored Villa Cloe in Ta' Xbiex, at the periphery of the promenade. According to Mark G. Muscat, "Villa Cloe is unique for its interesting use of multifaceted stonework beneath the windows and vertical fascio-like elements subdividing the columns. This villa may be attributable to a Stile Littorio manifestation, but similar motifs were quite common in Art Deco architectural constructions both in the United Kingdom and the United States."
