= Fawwara Gate =

- Bieb il-Fawwara
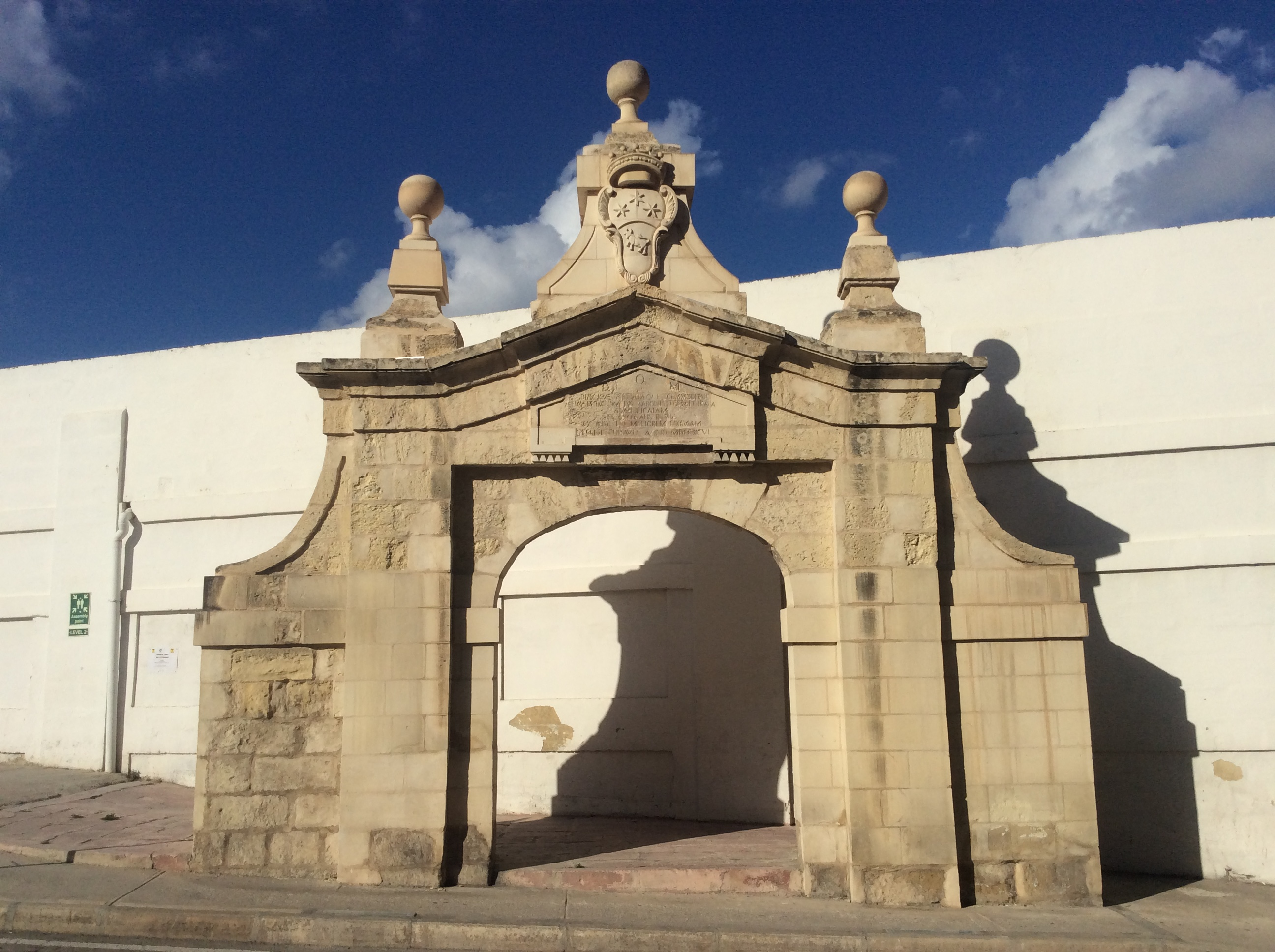
- View of Fawwara Gate
- Interactive map of the Fawwara Gate area

General information
- Status: Intact
- Type: Commemorative arch
- Architectural style: Neoclassical
- Location: Gzira, Malta
- Coordinates: 35°54′4.80″N 14°29′27.30″E
- Named for: Fawwara estates
- Completed: 1796

Technical details
- Material: Limestone

Fawwara Gate (Maltese: Bieb il-Fawwara - fawwara literally means spring of water, or a fountain), also known as Gzira Gate (Bieb Il-Gzira), Sliema Gate, Testaferrata Gate and Tower Gate (Bieb it-Torri), is a late 18th-century archway built during the rule of the Order of St. John in Gżira, Malta. The archway was built as a commemoration of a new principal main road that is set on a long stretch of lands from Msida to Sliema; today being two roads namely Msida Road and Rue d'Argens.

== Location ==
The archway is located near Rue d'Argens on the way from Msida to Sliema. The archway was said to have been dismantled by members of the Sliema Historic Society (SHS), but this was categorically denied by Salvino Testaferrata Moroni Viani by providing primary sources as evidence. Today the archway stands in a less notable place as the area has been built up, and it is generally ignored for standing on a side road of Gzira next to Muscat Motors, a car showroom. It is few metres away from the Empire Stadium, the former national Maltese football stadium.

== History ==
The archway was built by the aristocratic Testaferrata family in 1796 when Fra Nicolaus Butius saw the need for the development of a main road in the area to facilitate movement from Msida to Sliema, with this event commemorated with the structure itself. The gate originally stood in the locality of Birkirkara but with the passage of time the area where it stands became a separate locality as Gzira. Another similar archway with similar architecture was built in Ta' Xbiex, the Ta' Xbiex Gate by the same Testaferrata family. This was demolished in 1989 and the exact location it stood is unknown but was in the parameters of Brockdorff Street. The Fawwara Gate was a source of inspiration to 19th-century painters. A fortified tower was located in the whereabouts of the building, with the gate possibly serving as a gateway to the tower. The street where the gate is found is named for the tower as Triq it-Torri.

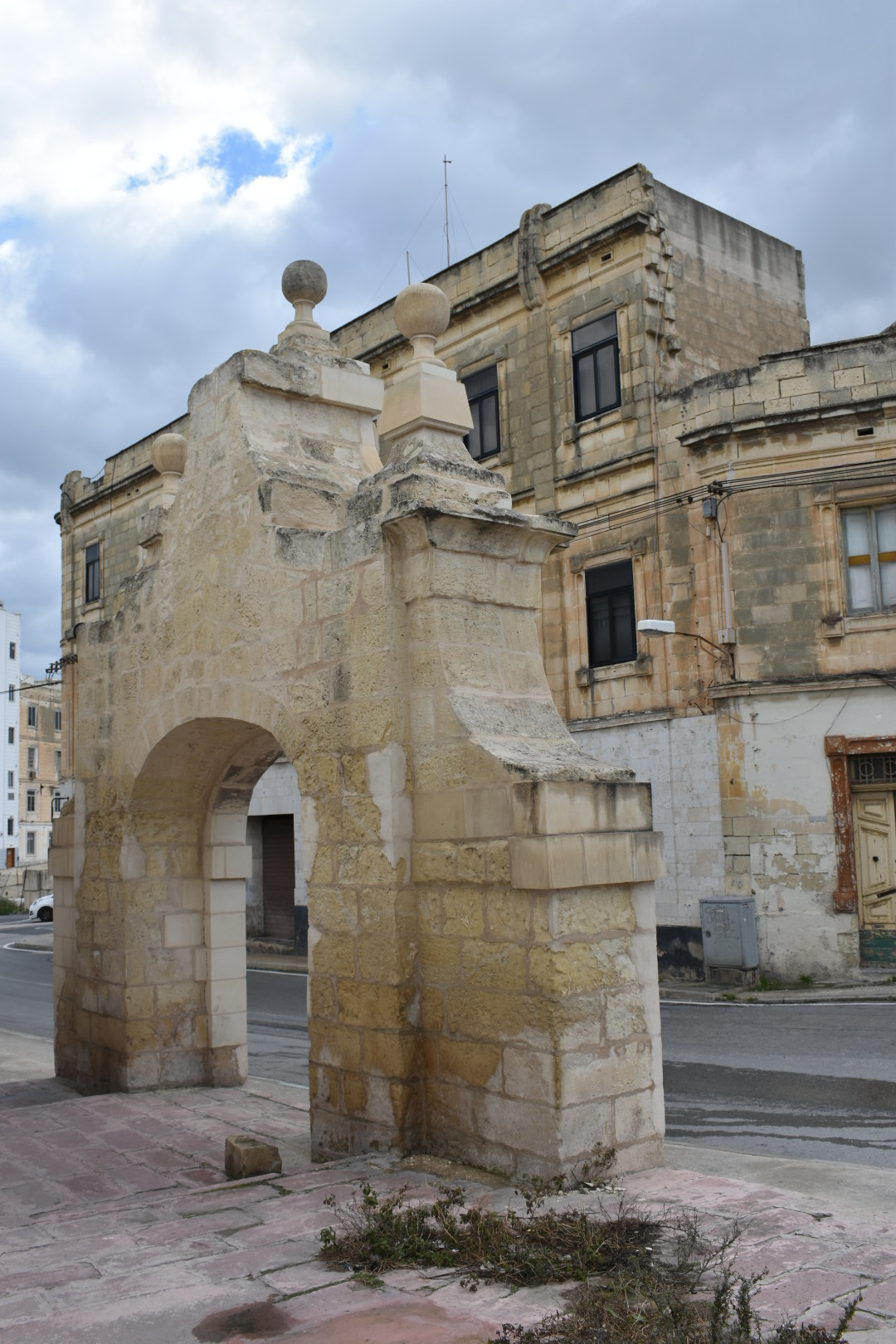
Back side of Fawwara Gate

The archway has been left in a dilapidated state for quite some years, having had unprofessional restoration in 1908 with the use of cement causing it more harm. Since 1933 the archway was given to the responsibility of a business as part of the contractual lease of a site in the vicinity. However no maintenance has ever been recorded to have taken place until it came to a wider public criticism of its neglect. At one point, the actual owners being the Sant Fournier family at the time sold the business due to financial constrains caused by WWII.

On the turn of the 21st century the gate was caught by the attention of the Sliema Historic Society (SHS), bringing the attention of the local media, leading and exposing outrage of its state. In 2011-2012 the arch was in danger to collapse and for this reason it was listed under the Emergency Conservation Order with the use of the Environment and Development Planning Act 2010 with the use of article 82. The government of Malta was sensitive of not infringing law as the archway stands on private property. The business owner took responsibility to restore the archway and works of restoration were carried out in 2013. Today the archway is in a good state of preservation and open to public any time of the day.

It has been initially suggested that the gate be graded as grade 2 national monument but was later graded as grade 1 national monument in the final decision of the Malta Environment and Planning Authority (MEPA).

== Description ==
In a 1930 publication by Sir Temi Zammit the archway is praised for it architecture with Zammit referring to it as "a beautiful stone gateway." On the archway one finds the coat of arms of the Testaferrata family and an inscription.

=== Inscription ===
The inscription on the gate is written as the following:

D. O. M.

Publicae Privatæque Commoditat Viam
ex Praedis Baronis Testaferrata
Amplificatam
Fr. Nicolaus Butius
Ex Rudi in Meliorem Formam
Sterni curavit Anno MDCCXCVI
