= Orfei =

Orfei is Italian surname:

- Giovanni Orfei (born 1976, Tivoli), Italian footballer
- Liana Orfei (born 1937), Italian film actress
- Orfeo Orfei (1836-1915), Italian painter
- Moira Orfei (a.k.a. Miranda Orfei; 1931–2015, Codroipo), Italian actress and television personality

== See also ==
- Orfey (disambiguation)
