= Carmelite Parish Church, Gżira =

Parish Church of Our Lady of Mount Carmel
- Il-Knisja Parrokjali tal-Madonna tal-Karmnu
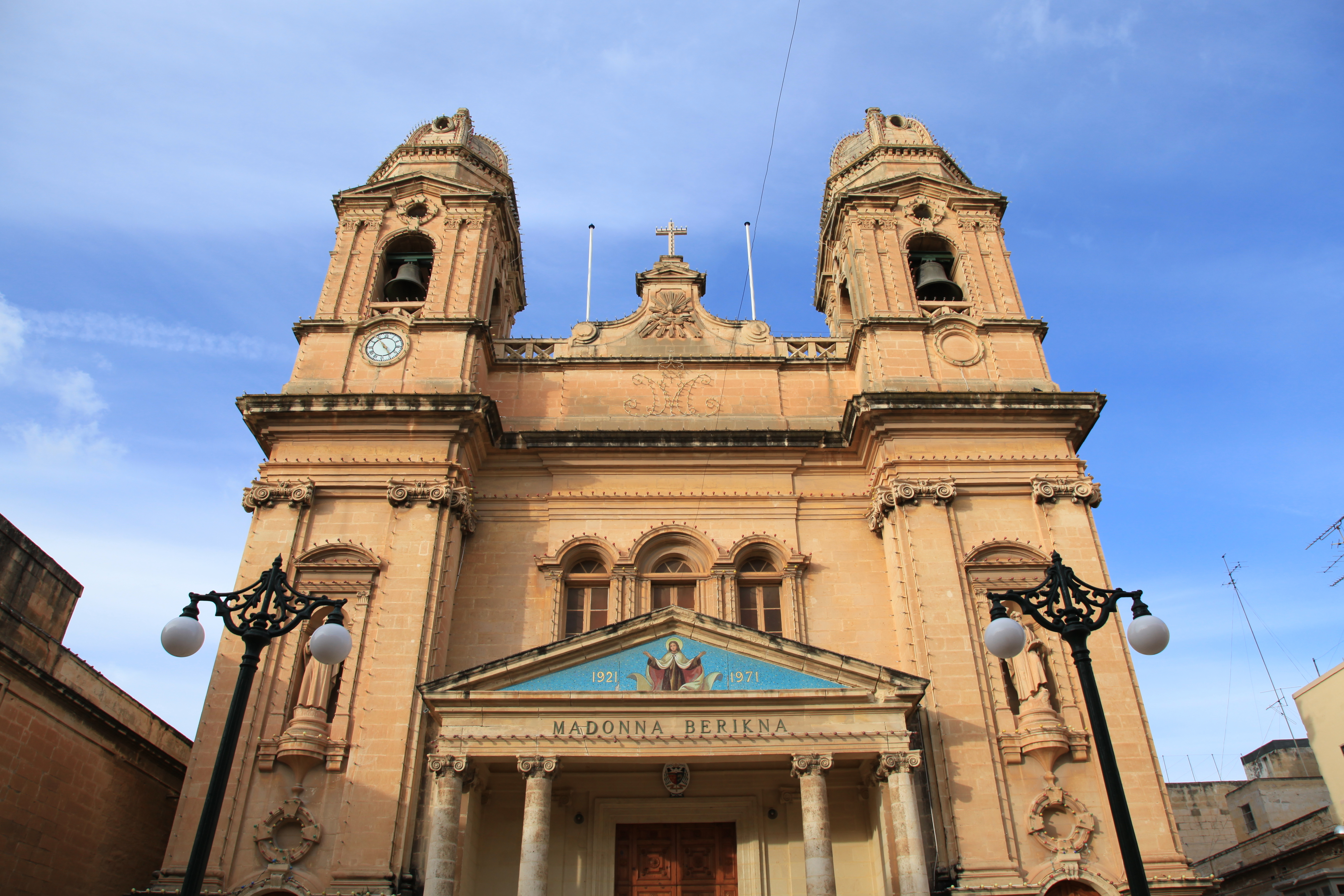
- Parish Church of Our Lady of Mount Carmel
- 35°54′17.9″N 14°29′41.1″E
- Location: Gżira, Malta
- Denomination: Roman Catholic

History
- Status: Parish church
- Dedication: Our Lady of Mount Carmel
- Consecrated: 23 May 1959

Architecture
- Functional status: Active
- Architectural type: Church
- Style: Doric

Specifications
- Materials: Limestone

Administration
- Archdiocese: Malta
- Parish: Gżira

Clergy
- Rector: Carmelo Tanti

The Parish Church of Our Lady of Mount Carmel or simply known as the Carmelite Church is a Doric Roman Catholic parish church located in Gżira, Malta.

== History ==
The original chapel of Our Lady of Mount Carmel goes back to the early 20th century. The chapel was founded after an incident that took place on July 10, 1902, when two drunken sailors started throwing stones at a house near the bridge leading to Manoel island. One of the stones became stuck between the glass and an image of Our Lady of Mount Carmel in a small shrine on the wall of the house. Locals took this as a divine sign. The image and stone were carefully removed and preserved in the parish church of Our Lady Star of the Sea in Sliema. After some years the image was returned to Gżira and a small chapel was built to house the image. On July 7, 1913, Archbishop Pietro Pace made the small chapel a vice-parish church serving the locals under the authority of the parish of Sliema.

On 15 May 1921 Archbishop Maurus Caruana created the independent parish of Gżira with the church of Our Lady of Mount Carmel as the parish church. The chapel had a capacity of 200 people which was too small for the increasing population. Consequently, a new church was built between 1921 and 1935. The church was consecrated on 23 May 1959. The image and the stone are still preserved in the church in a side chapel.
