= Joseph Colombo (architect) =

Maltese architect (died 1970)

Joseph Colombo (died January 1970) was a Maltese architect active in the 1930s, in particular in the Gżira area.

His private residence in Rue d'Argens, Gżira, (block 326–306), known as 'Jeanne 312', has a double front dwelling built in the interwar period. It was shortlisted for the first architectural awards held in 1936. Malta's Planning Authority gave it Grade 2 protection status, saying the building's elevation was exceptional in the way that the traditional townhouse had been reinterpreted in a modernist style making use of strong geometric motifs

Colombo also designed the nearby townhouse which was the residence of his brother Arturo Colombo who had a chequered career as a medical doctor, politician with the Labour party under Pawlu Boffa and then became a Capucchin monk.

Colombo also designed the Mira showroom building and the former Embassy Cinema in Valletta, both of which have been demolished. The Mira Motors building, built in the late 1930s, was described by Conrad Thake and Quentin Hughes as "one of the first pioneering examples of a modernist concrete frame structure building to be built on the island”. “The façade of the imposing building is a skilful composition whereby the main structural elements create a rhythmic division along both the horizontal and vertical dimensions.” For many years, it also held the record as the largest clear span building in Malta, making it a unique forward-looking construction.

In 1945 Colombo rebuilt in streamline moderne style the Muscats Motors showroom in Gżira, said to be "possibly the best example of commercial or retail modern architecture in the Maltese Islands."

Colombo specialised in reinforced concrete and was the head of the Architecture department at the University of Malta for several years.

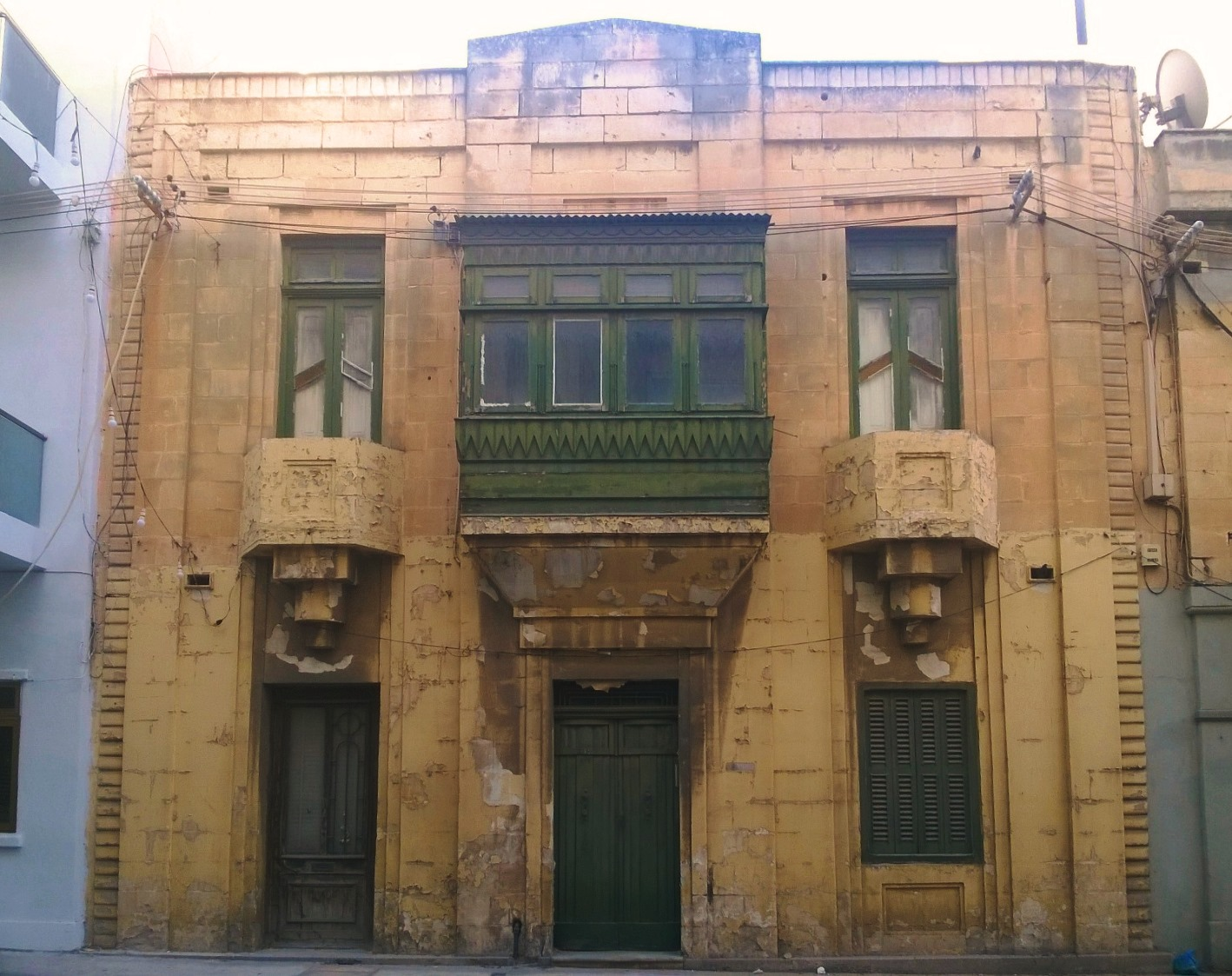
Colombo's private residence, Jeanne, in rue d'Argens 312, Gżira

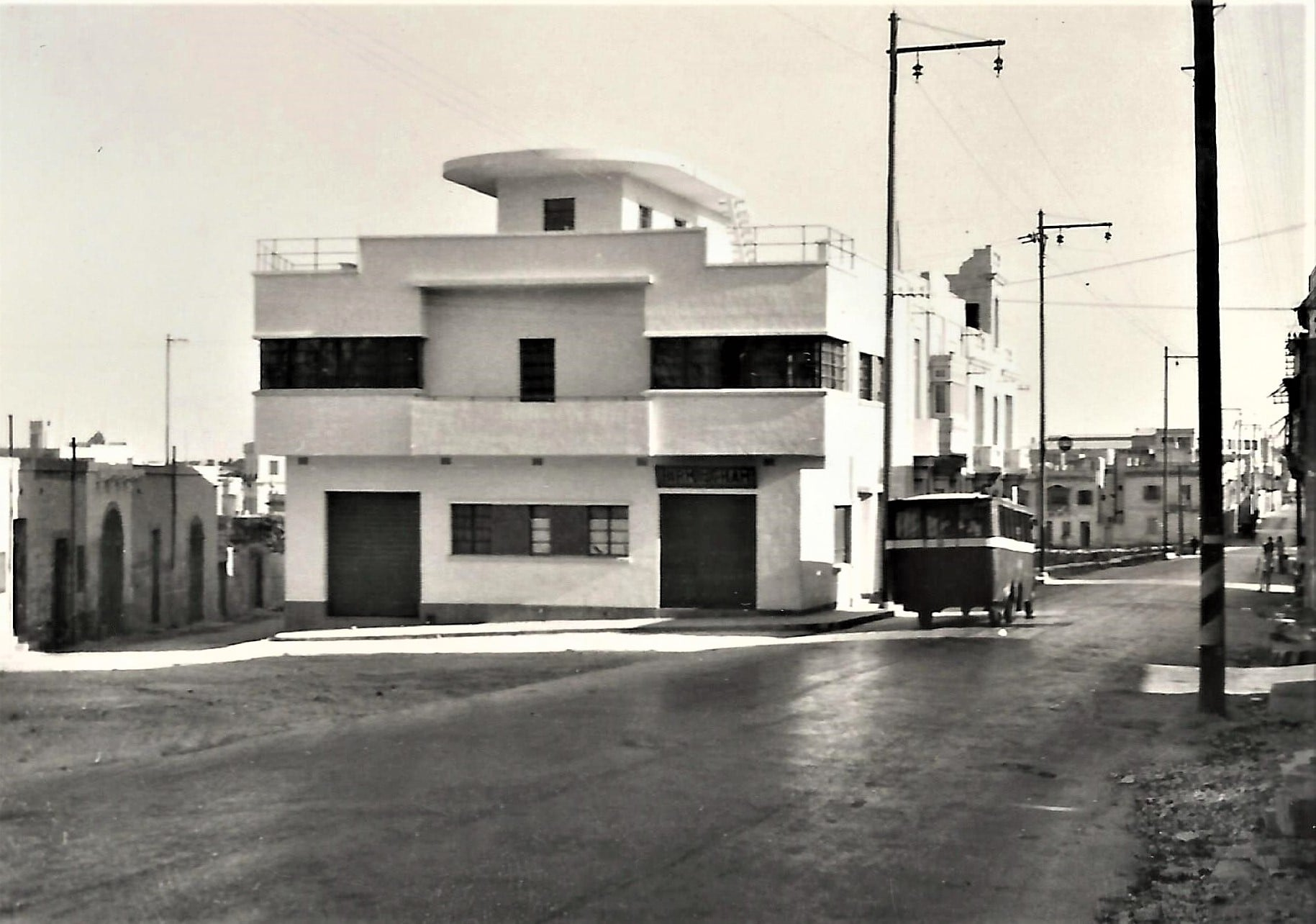
1930s Modernist building in rue d'Argens 316, Gżira

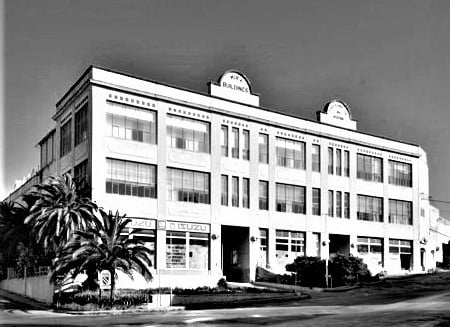
Mira showroom, Gżira

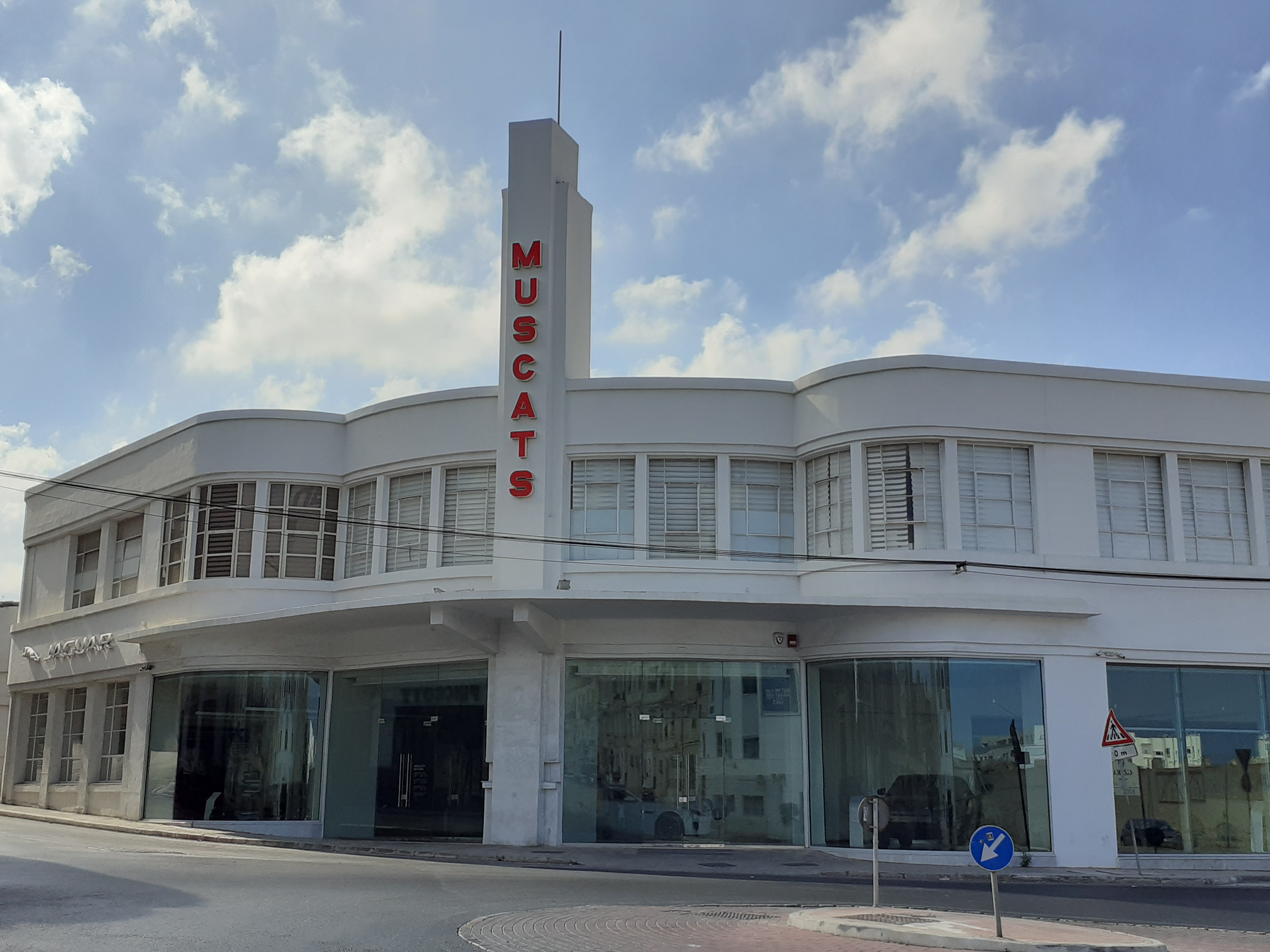
Muscats Motors, Gżira (1945)
