= Orfey =

Orfey, Орфей, is the Bulgarian spelling of Orpheus, a legendary figure in Greek and Thracian mythology, chief among poets and musicians.

Orfey may refer to:

- Orfey class destroyer
- Radio Orfey

== See also ==
- Orpheus (disambiguation), the English and German spelling
- Orphée (disambiguation), the French spelling
- Orfeas (disambiguation), Ορφέας, the Greek spelling
- Orfeo (disambiguation), the Italian spelling
- Orfeu (disambiguation), the Portuguese spelling
