= Orpheum Theatre (Malta) =

Building in Gżira, Malta

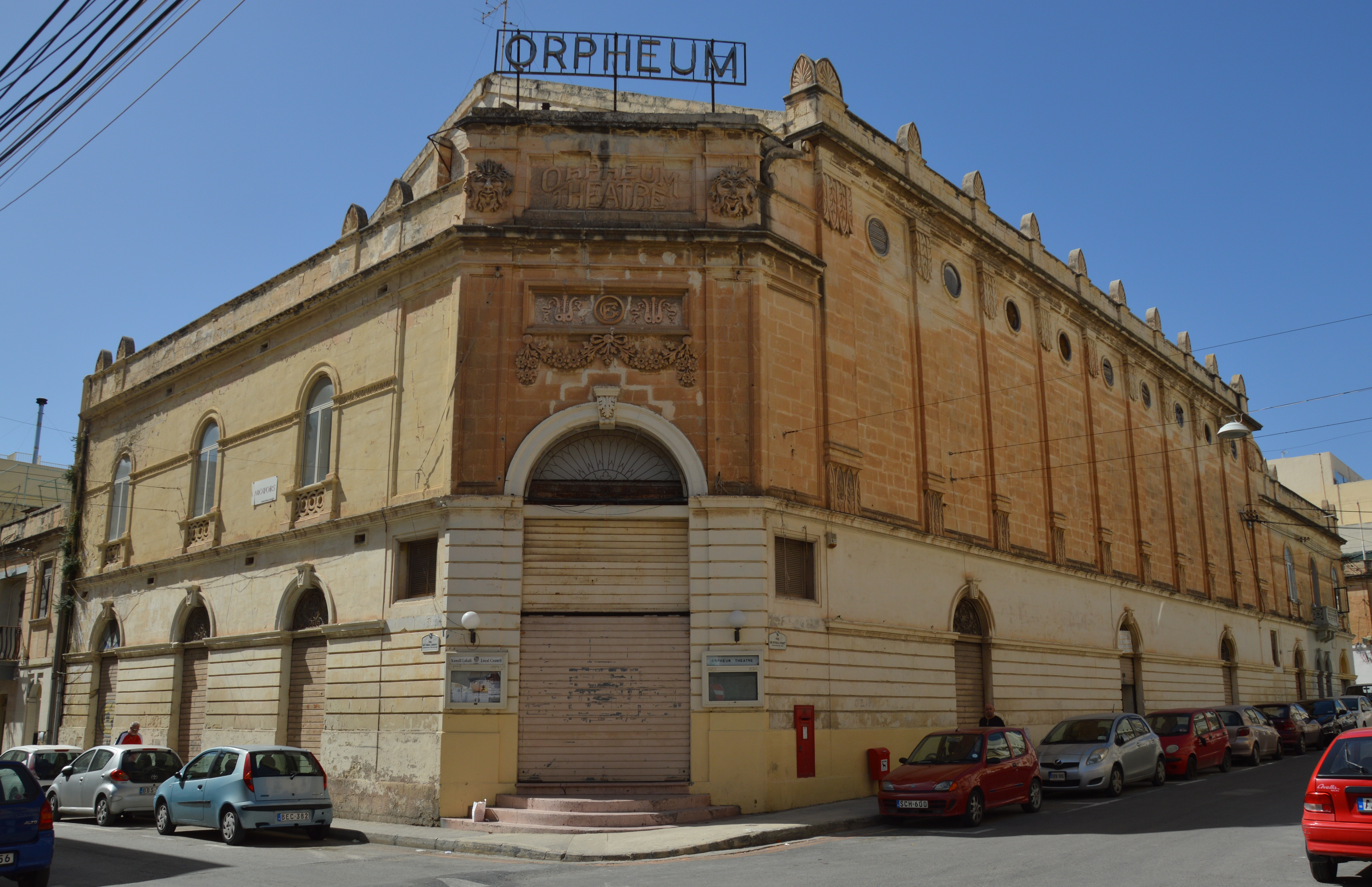
- Orpheum Theatre (Gżira, Malta) as at 11 March 2018
- Interactive map of Orpheum Theatre
- Coordinates: 35°54′20″N 14°29′44″E

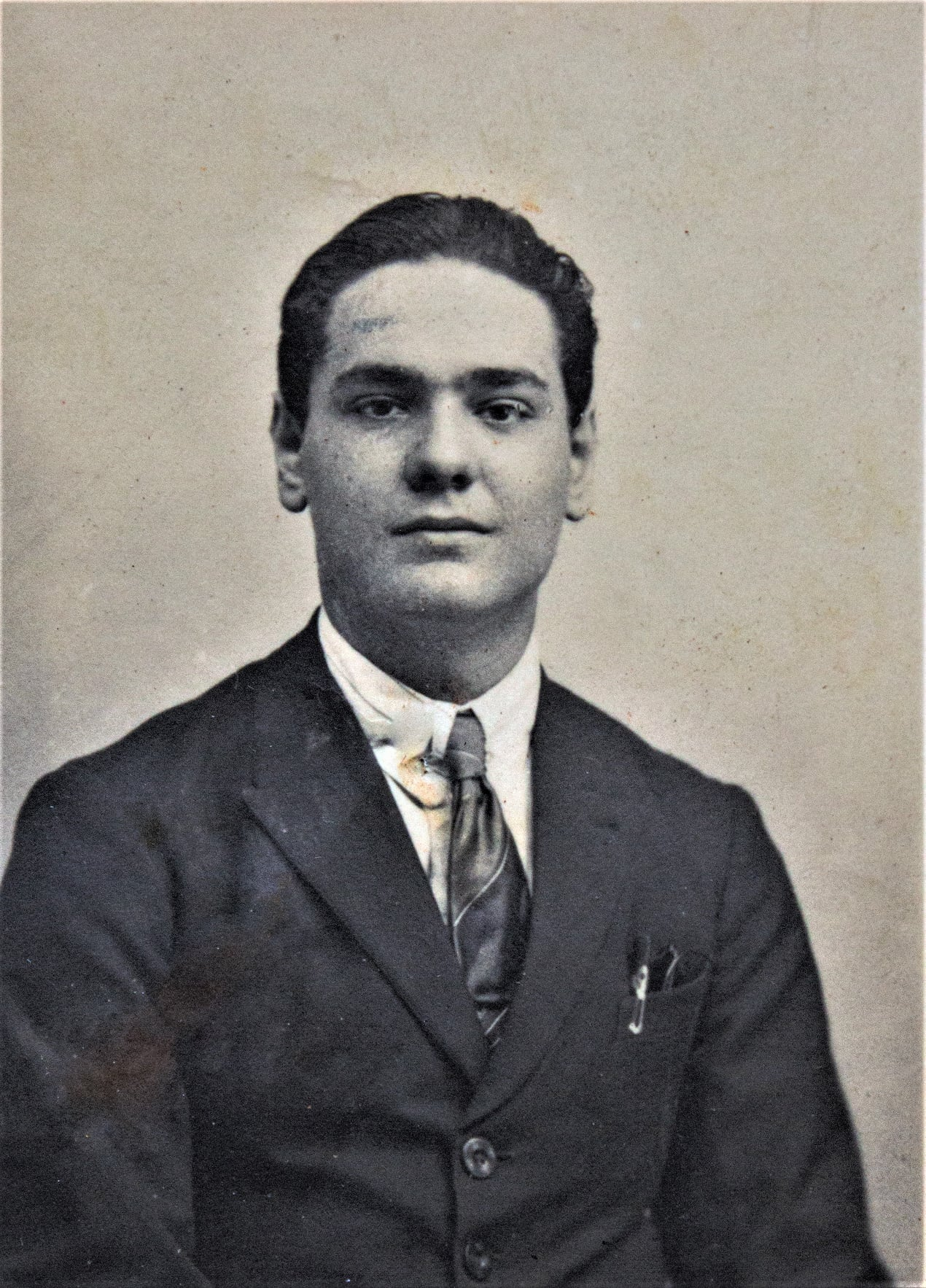
Harold J. Borg (1908–1981), architect of the Orpheum Theatre

The Orpheum Theatre is a building situated in Gżira, Malta. It was designed in 1932 by the Maltese architect Harold J. Borg (1908–1981), then still in his early twenties, to the design of Art Nouveau with Spanish features.

The theatre was commissioned by Felix Gerada, a developer who lived between Malta and Detroit (hence the initials FG on the façade) on land he purchased from the Marquis Desain and was built to serve as a movie theatre. The carved relief is said to be the work of sculptor Alfredo Azzopardi, who had already worked on the Balluta buildings as well as on the Msida Parish church. The Orpheum is a Grade 1 scheduled building since 2001 thanks to the presence of a painting of Orpheus on the ceiling, by Raphael Bonnici Calì (1907–2002).

The Orpheum is a near-complete survivor of the large, single-screen cinemas on Malta. Like many of the island’s cinemas, it was flat-floored in the stalls and had a single balcony.

== Notable performances ==
Many world known performers gave performances at the Orpheum.

On the 24–25 March 1950, the Italian Tenor Tito Schipa performed at the building. A few weeks later, Maria Caniglia gave two recitals. She was supported by the Maltese Tenors Oreste Kirkop and Paul Asciak.

On 10 July 1953, Sir Malcolm Sargent directed the Coronation Concert given by the Royal Marines Band Service.

The Italian singer Claudio Villa performed at the theatre on the 29 and 30 May 1954.

In 1955 the Tenor Luciano Tajoli gave five performances.

In June 1958 Domenico Modugno performed at the Orpheum. Among the various interpretations he gave, he sang Nel blu dipinto di blu.

At the age of 11, the Maltese singer Mary Spiteri began her singing career in this theatre.

During the 1990s (sometime in 1993/94), the first spontaneous pride party was organised at the Orpheum Theatre, even though the police intervened just a few hours into the party.

Black Sabbath gave a concert at the Orpheum on 25 August 1995.
