= Orfeo (spider) =

Scientific classification
- Kingdom: Animalia
- Phylum: Arthropoda
- Subphylum: Chelicerata
- Class: Arachnida
- Order: Araneae
- Infraorder: Araneomorphae
- Family: Linyphiidae
- Genus: Orfeo; Miller, 2007

Type species
- O. jobim Miller, 2007

Species
- 2, see text

Genus of spiders

Orfeo is a genus of South American dwarf spiders that was first described by J. A. Miller in 2007.

== Species ==
As of May 2019 it contains two species:

- Orfeo desolatus (Keyserling, 1886) – Brazil
- Orfeo jobim Miller, 2007 (type) – Brazil
