= Simone De Battista =

Maltese film and theatre actress

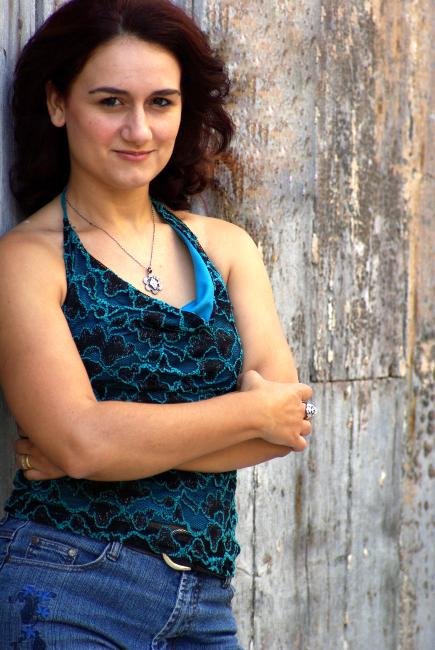
- Born: November 14, 1977 (age 48); Malta
- Occupations: Actress, television presenter, producer
- Years active: present
- Known for: Dejjem Tieghek Beckie (2005–2006); Santa Monika (2006); Pupi (2007); F'Salib it-Toroq

Simone De Battista (born 14 November 1977) is a Maltese film and theatre actress. She started off her career in the theatre and musical scene since she was very young. Her early theatre performances were held at the MTADA Theatre, Blata l-Bajda. As an actress, she performed many major roles in productions with Atturi Salesjani, Bronk Productions, CurtainRaiser Theatre Troupe, Kumpanija Teatru Rjal and Produzzjoni Teatrali Irtokki.

== Performances ==
Her acting performances include: La Bottega del Cafe (2002), Wicc ‘imb Wicc (Face to Face) (2002), Divorzju bi Prova (Divorce by Trial) (2003), Ix-Xewwiex minn Nazaret (2004), Il-Hadd fuq il-Bejt (Sunday on the Roof) (2005), Ma’ l-Ahhar Tokki… (2005), Min Qatel lil Ganni? (Who killed Ganni?) (2006), Avukati 247 (2007) and many others.

== Television ==
Amongst her works she appeared on local television, in the popular series Dejjem Tieghek Beckie in 2005/6, Id-Driegh t'Alla in 2005, Santa Monika in 2006, Pupi in 2007, Il-Kristu tal-Kerrejja in 2008 and in Is-Siġill tal-Qrar under the help of director Ivan De Battista. Moreover, she worked in F'Salib it-Toroq and recently in Rifless. She produced and presented the programme "Karriera" that was won for "Best Teen/Children Programme" in "The Malta Television Awards 2017"
