= Orpheum Dresden =

Event hall and ballroom in Dresden, Germany

Coordinates: 51°04′01″N 13°45′26″E

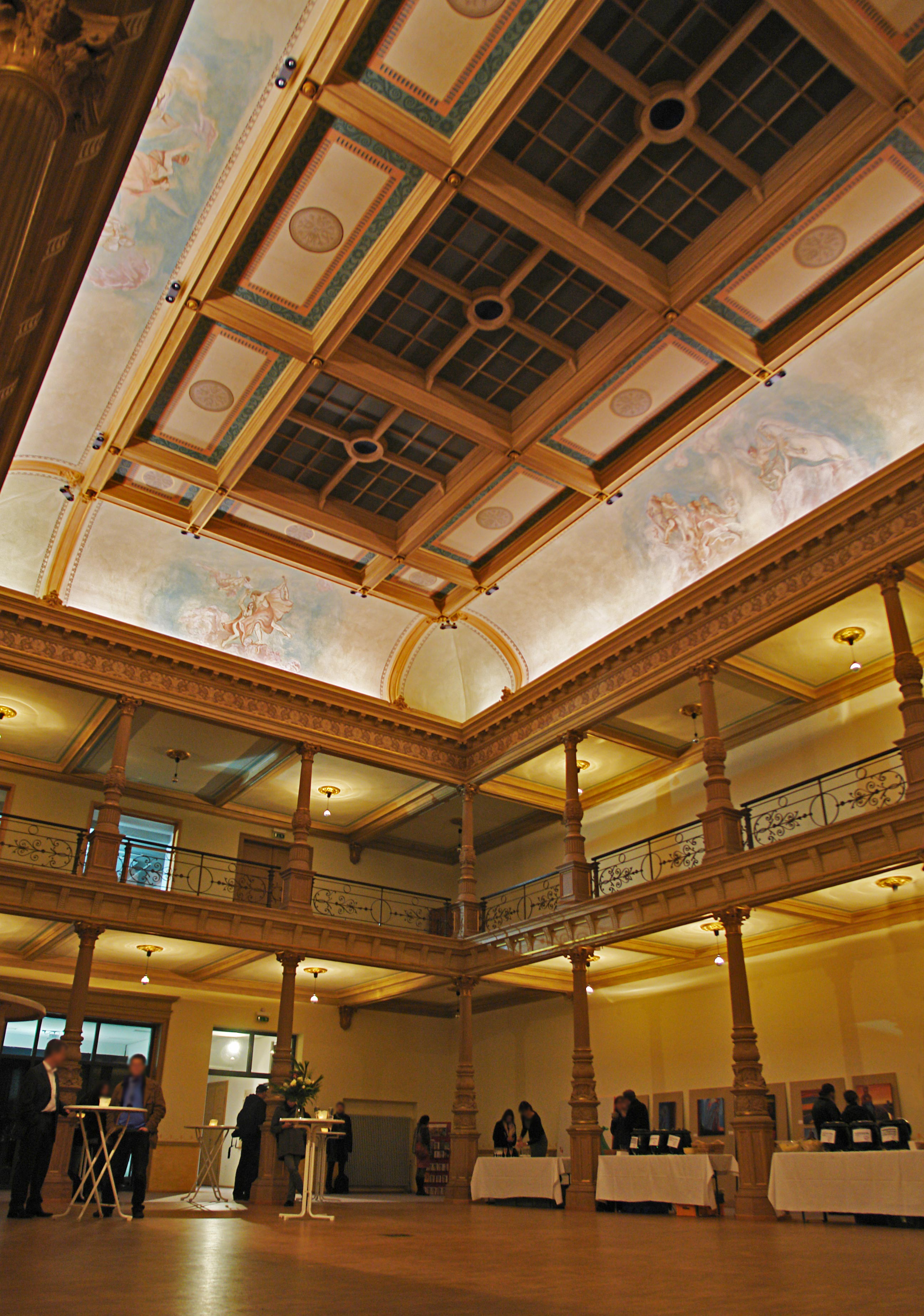
Interior of ballroom, Orpheum Dresden

The Orpheum Dresden is an event hall, the oldest ballroom in the Äußere Neustadt district of Dresden, Germany.

== Description ==
The ballroom is located in a four-story Gründerzeit house, in which shops are also present, at Kamenzer road 19, Äußere Neustadt. The entrance leads through a passage to a room of nearly 400 square metres (4,300 sq ft) that is not discernible from the outside. The interior is a historical landmark, with all the original fixtures extant, including the stage area, galleries, a double helix staircase, a skylight, and cast-iron columns. Also visible are old stucco ornamentations and various wall and ceiling paintings.

== History ==
The hall was established in 1873, and originally included the section that is now an apartment block. The hall was popular for dances and meetings, but the decrease in the social significance of balls and the simultaneous advent of cinema led to the closure of the hall in 1932. Noise pollution was also a concern of local residents.

From 1936 to 1996 the hall served as a piano workshop for the Thierbach brothers ("Piano Thierbach"), which kept the building from complete decay. After that company moved to the nearby Bohemian Street, the Orpheum was largely restored to its original condition for its 125th anniversary in 1998. The west side of the building was remodeled for better lighting. The stage was removed and replaced by a glass facade, two stories high, encompassing the entire width of the room. After the renovations were complete, the hall was first used as an architectural office, and then as an exhibition and concert hall. Since May 2010 it is a coworking space.
