= HMS Orpheus =

Seven ships of the Royal Navy have been named HMS Orpheus. Orpheus was the magical father of songs in Greek mythology.

- HMS Orpheus (1773) was a modified Lowestoffe-class frigate launched in 1773. She was burnt in 1778 to avoid capture by the French at Rhode Island.
- HMS Orpheus (1780) was a 32-gun fifth rate launched in 1780. In 1807 she was wrecked in the West Indies.
- HMS Orpheus (1809) was a 36-gun fifth rate launched in 1809. She was broken up in 1819.
- HMS Orpheus (1860) was a 22-gun Jason-class wooden screw corvette launched in 1860. She was wrecked on the Manukau sandbars in New Zealand in 1863.
- HMS Orpheus (1916) was an Admiralty M-class destroyer launched in 1916. She was sold for scrap in 1921.
- HMS Orpheus (N46) was an Odin-class submarine launched in 1929. She was lost with all hands off Tobruk in 1940 after being depth-charged by the Italian destroyer Turbine.
- HMS Orpheus (S11) was an Oberon-class submarine, launched in 1959. She was paid off in 1987 and became a harbour training ship. She was sold for scrap in 1994.
