= Orpheum Theatre (Champaign, Illinois) =

Vaudeville and movie theater

- New Orpheum Theatre
- U.S. National Register of Historic Places
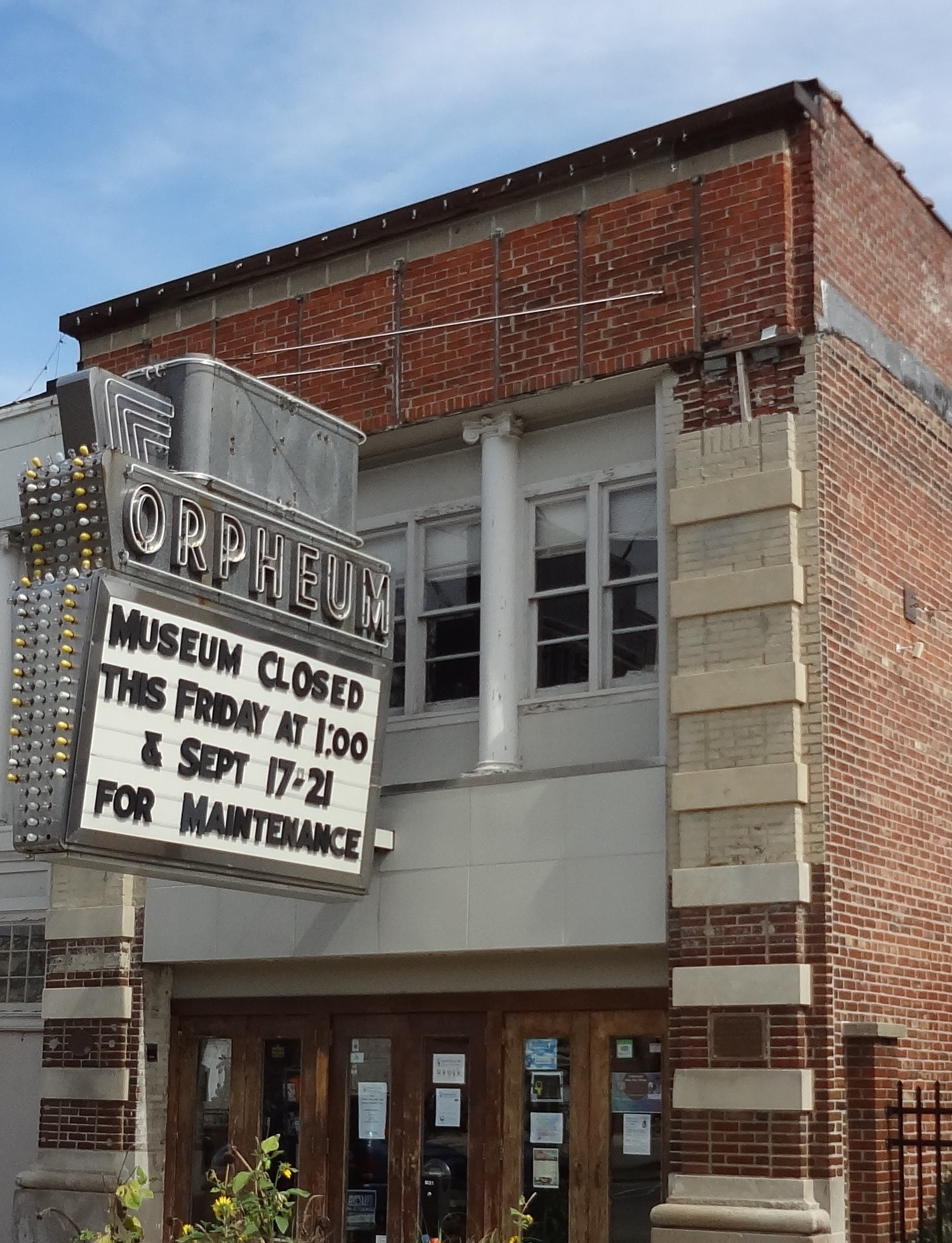
- (2012)

- Location within Illinois Location within the United States
- Location: 346–352 N. Neil St. Champaign, Illinois
- Coordinates: 40°7′10″N 88°14′33″W
- Built: 1914
- Architect: Rapp & Rapp
- Architectural style: Classical Revival
- NRHP reference No.: 91000085
- Added to NRHP: February 28, 1991

The Orpheum Theater opened in Champaign, Illinois in 1914 on the site of a vaudeville theater built in 1904. Designed by the architectural firm Rapp & Rapp, the Orpheum (also known as The New Orpheum) was built to accommodate both live vaudeville performances and the projection of film. After a series of renovations and changes of ownership, the Orpheum screened its final film in 1986.

Preserved from demolition in 1991, the Orpheum is now home to a children's museum, the Orpheum Children's Science Museum, and is undergoing restoration.

== Design and construction ==
One of the earliest examples of movie theater architecture, the Orpheum is an early design by the prolific architectural firm Rapp and Rapp, a firm that would later design many famous American "Movie Palaces" in the first decades of the twentieth century.

George Leslie Rapp, an 1899 alumnus of the University of Illinois School of Architecture, with his brother Corneilus, founded the firm of Rapp & Rapp. They designed over 400 theaters including the Majestic Theater in Dubuque, Iowa (1910), the Chicago Theatre (1921), Bismark Hotel and Theatre (1926), Mighigan Theatre, Detroit (1926), Oriental Theater, Chicago (1926), and the Paramount Theater in New York City (1926) and Aurora (1931).

Rapp and Rapp designed the Orpheum as a scale model of the opera house at Versailles. The following year, they designed the Al. Ringling Theatre in Baraboo, Wisconsin, which was also a model of the Versailles opera house. The Ringlings, however, spent considerably more money for decorations.

The Orpheum interior style is French Renaissance and Baroque and the exterior is Classical Revival. There were 754 seats and 18 loge boxes.

The owners were Joseph M. Finn and Marcus Heiman of F&H Amusement Company. General contractor was Wile Brothers of Chicago, specialists in theater construction. The contract price was between $65,000 and $70,000. Work began in late May 1914. Mandel Brothers of Chicago had the contract for the draperies and other interior decorations. The scenery was done by Sosman & Landis of Chicago, who were considered the best scenery painters in the middle west.

== Early history in vaudeville ==
Opening Night was on October 19, 1914. The performance began with the New Orpheum orchestra, under the leadership of Larry J. Powers, playing the "Illinois Loyalty", followed by "America" and "The Star-Spangled Banner". Mayor Oliver B. Dobbins gave a short speech complimenting the management for its elaborate and expensive effort to provide such an elegant theatre. Five high class vaudeville acts were presented, headlined by singer and comedian Herman Timberg, who had appeared a few weeks earlier at Chicago's Palace Theater. The evening closed with moving pictures. The manager was C. S. Harris.

The Orpheum was the main vaudeville stop in Champaign and Urbana, and a member of the noted Orpheum Circuit. It played host to many famous vaudevillians, including Trixie Friganza, Red Skelton, Harry Houdini (1923), Chic Sale, Virginia Sale, Will Rogers (1915), the Marx Brothers (1918), Bill "Bojangles" Robinson (1921), Jack Benny (1922), Bob Hope (1928), and Burns & Allen (1929). A few of the now classic films shown during the Orpheum's long history include Birth of A Nation (1916), Intolerance (1917), City Lights (1931), Gone With the Wind (1940 & 1968), Dumbo (1941), A Streetcar Named Desire (1952), Mister Roberts (1955), and A Hard Day's Night (1964).

During the Orpheum's vaudeville period, part of the theater's second floor served as a boarding house, often housing African Americans at a time when local hotels practiced racial discrimination.

== As a cinema ==
In the 1920s RKO Pictures began operating the Orpheum Theatre (it also operated the nearby Virginia Theater). Under the management of RKO, the theater was increasingly devoted to the screening of films, rather than to live performance in the vaudeville tradition. In 1967 a major renovation created a modern appearance by adding an aluminum facade and redoing the lobby.

In 1971 GKC Theaters purchased the Orpheum, as the theater struggled to remain profitable. In 1982 GKC leased it, as part of an attempt to recast the Orpheum as an art house. After this attempt failed, the Orpheum briefly returned to screening first run films, before finally closing in 1986, screening the trick slasher film April Fool's Day as the theater's final showing.

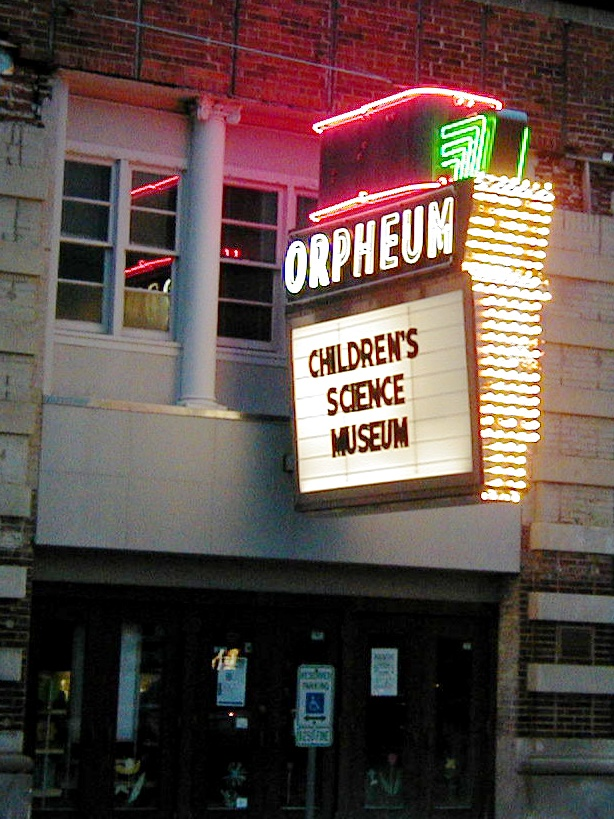
Champaign Orpheum Children's Museum

== Preservation and Children's Museum ==
The Champaign Preservation and Conservation Association (PACA) sponsored a public meeting on April 8, 1989, in response to plans to raze the now closed and deteriorating theater. This meeting was held to gauge public interest in saving the Orpheum Theatre. The City of Champaign purchased the Orpheum and adjacent building as a site for a possible parking deck in January 1990. The city allowed 45 PACA volunteers to spend Saturday, July 7, 1990, removing the aluminum facade to reveal the original look of the building and to assess any damage.

PACA hired theatre consultant Michael Hardy to do a feasibility study of the Orpheum. He suggested, in July 1990, a children's museum as a possible use for the building. The city did not have a children's museum and there were already several successful performing arts facilities in the area.

The City of Champaign razed the adjacent warehouse building in February 1991. In the fall of 1991, the theatre facade was cleaned and painted and the marquee given cosmetic repairs by PACA. The trompe l'oeil cornice reminiscent of the original was painted above the theater entrance. In 1994 the Orpheum Children's Science Museum opened its doors to the public.

The museum currently houses interactive exhibits and supports a variety of camps and clubs.

The board of the museum has expressed interest in either relocation or expansion of the facility. Proposals for reuse of the facility were requested by the museum board in January 2009. However, by 2013, long-term plans for the museum involved expansion of the current facility.

== Air-Maze Project Addition ==
In the summer of 2014, University Laboratory High School (Uni High) teacher Sharlene Denos met with leading members of the museum to discuss a project that could be done in tandem with the high school. Within six months, her students materialized the initiative. As of March 2017, this addition is still visible at the museum.
