= Orfeo Orfei =

Italian painter (1836–1915)

Orfeo Orfei (Massa Lombarda, 1836 - Bologna, 1915) was an Italian painter, mainly of genre working class subjects, at work or play, often in situations with touch of irony.

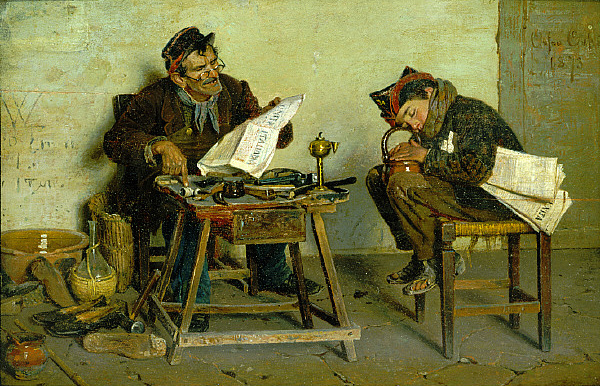
A Political Cobbler (1873)

== Biography ==
He was a resident of Bologna. Among his works are Il pittore di ventagli and L' ombrellaio. In 1888 at Bologna, he exhibited La conciliazione. He helped restore the frescoes of the Rocca Malatestiana in Cesena.

== Bibliography ==
- Renzo Grandi, ed. (1983). Dall'Accademia al vero. La pittura a Bologna prima e dopo l'Unità d'Italia (in Italian). Casalecchio di Reno: Grafis. pp. 198–199. ASIN B001GLE6F2.
