= Gżira =

Gżira Il-Gżira
- Local council
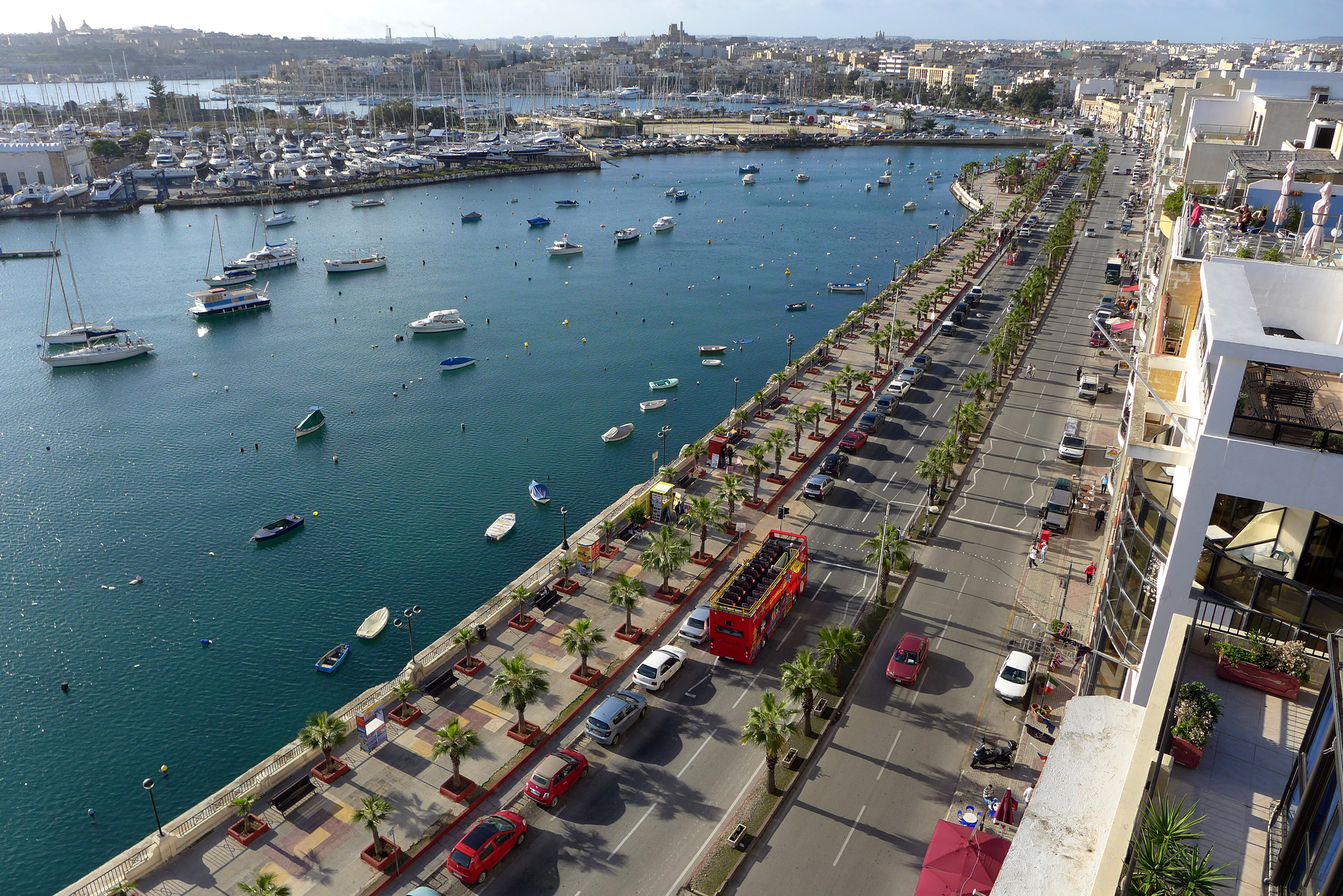
- Gżira promenade in February 2014

- Flag Coat of arms
- Motto: Flourishing with Justice
- Coordinates: 35°54′18″N 14°29′40″E
- Country: Malta
- Region: Eastern Region
- District: Northern Harbour District
- Borders: Msida, San Ġwann, Sliema, St. Julian's, Ta' Xbiex

Government
  - Mayor: Neville Chetcuti (Partit Laburista)

Area
  - Total: 1.5 km^{2} (0.58 sq mi)

Population (Jul. 2024)
  - Total: 12,343
  - Density: 8,200/km^{2} (21,000/sq mi)
- Demonym(s): Gżirjan (m), Gżirjana (f), Gżirjani (pl)
- Time zone: UTC+1 (CET)
  - Summer (DST): UTC+2 (CEST)
- Postal code: GZR
- Dialing code: 356
- ISO 3166 code: MT-12
- Patron saint: Our Lady of Mount Carmel
- Day of festa: Second Sunday of July
- Website: Official website

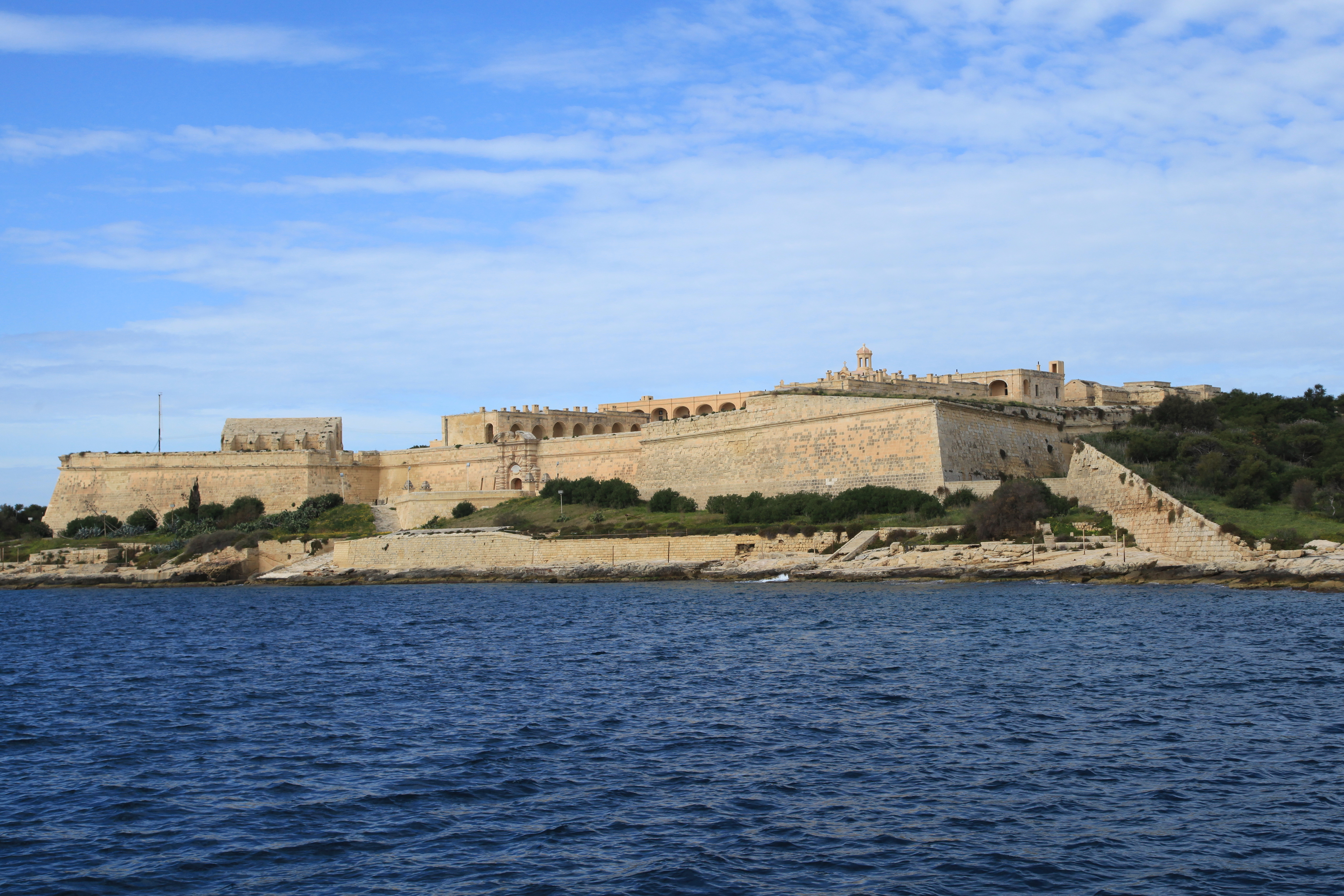
Fort Manoel on Manoel Island

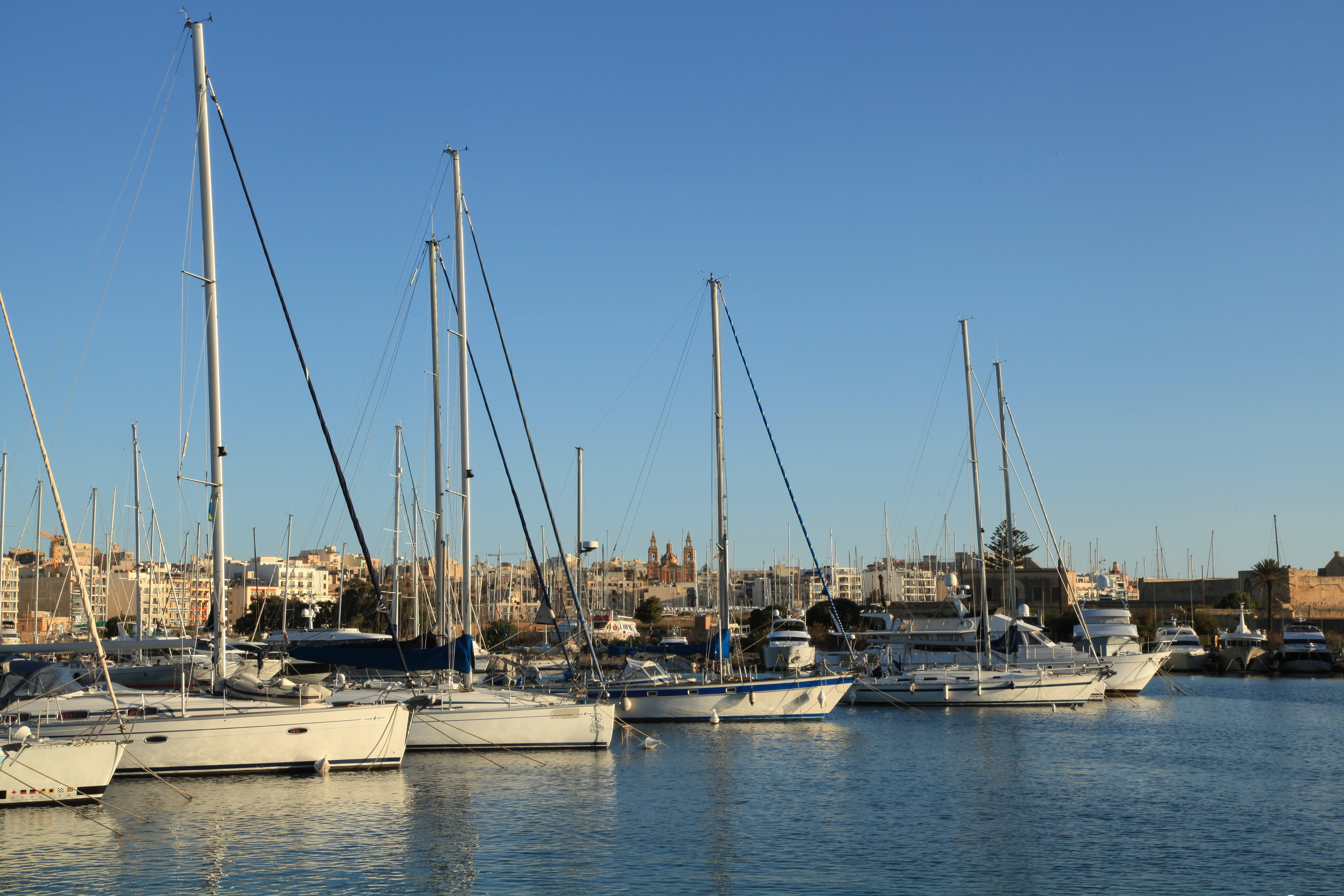
Gżira Harbour

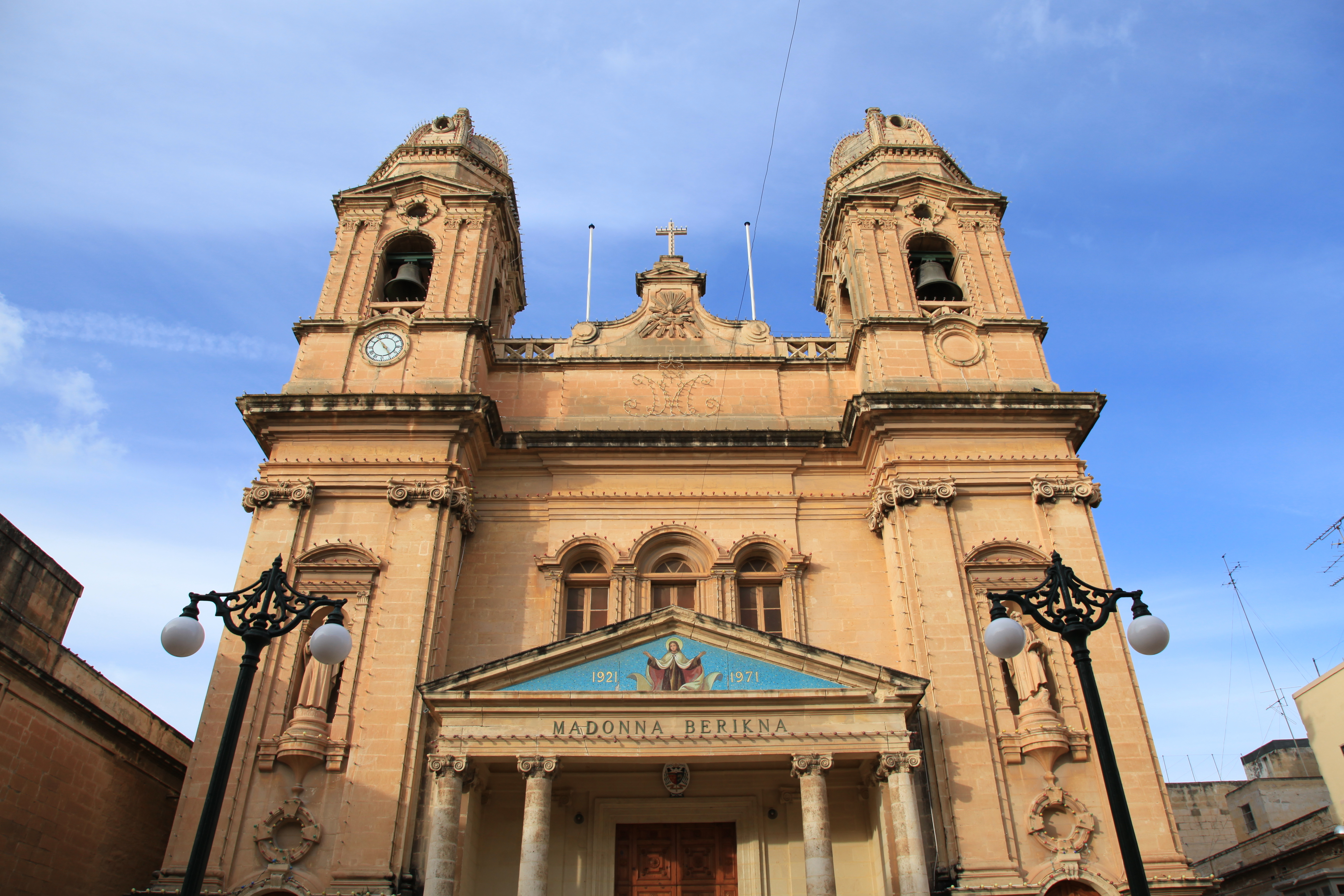
Gżira Parish Church

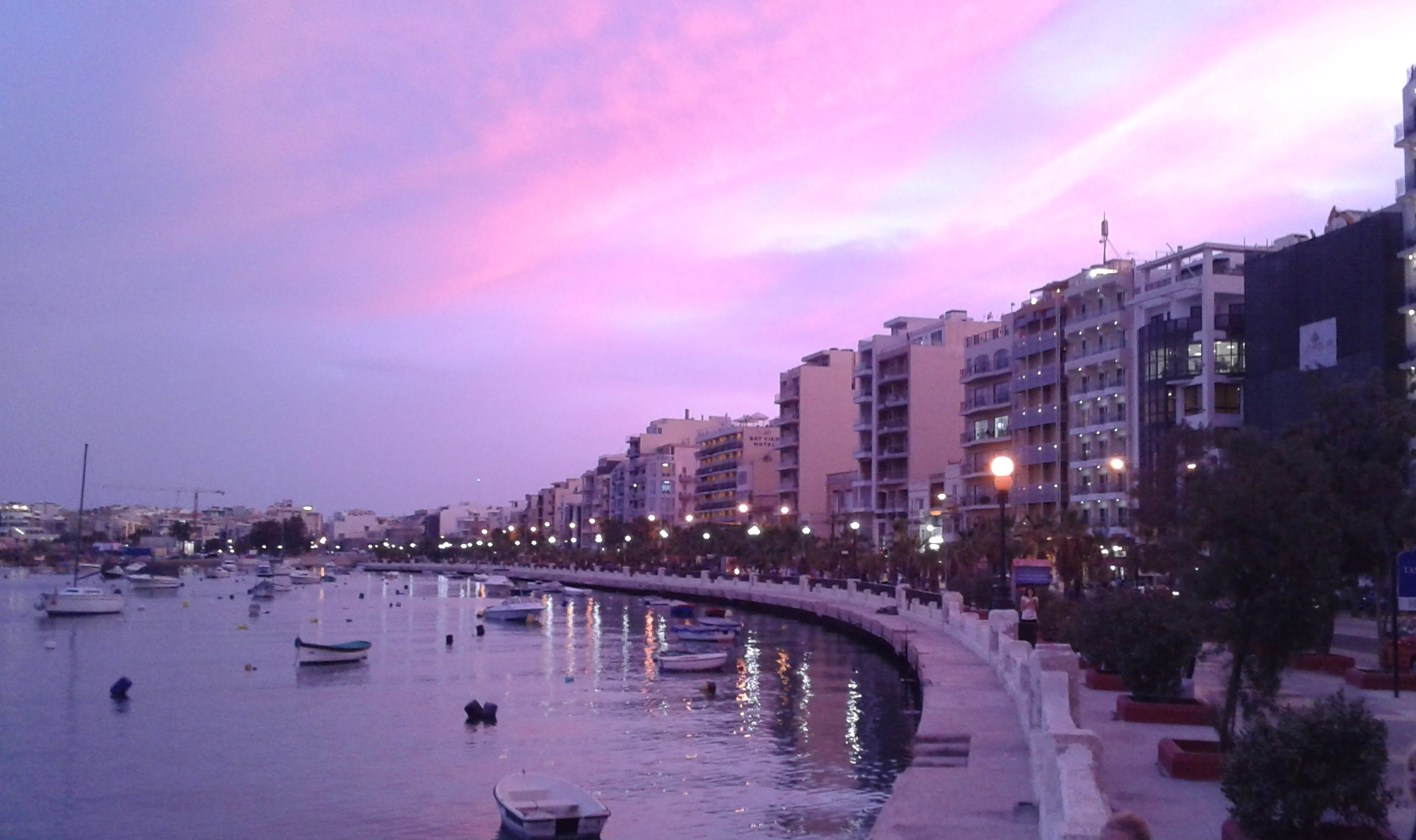
The Strand Gżira in May 2016

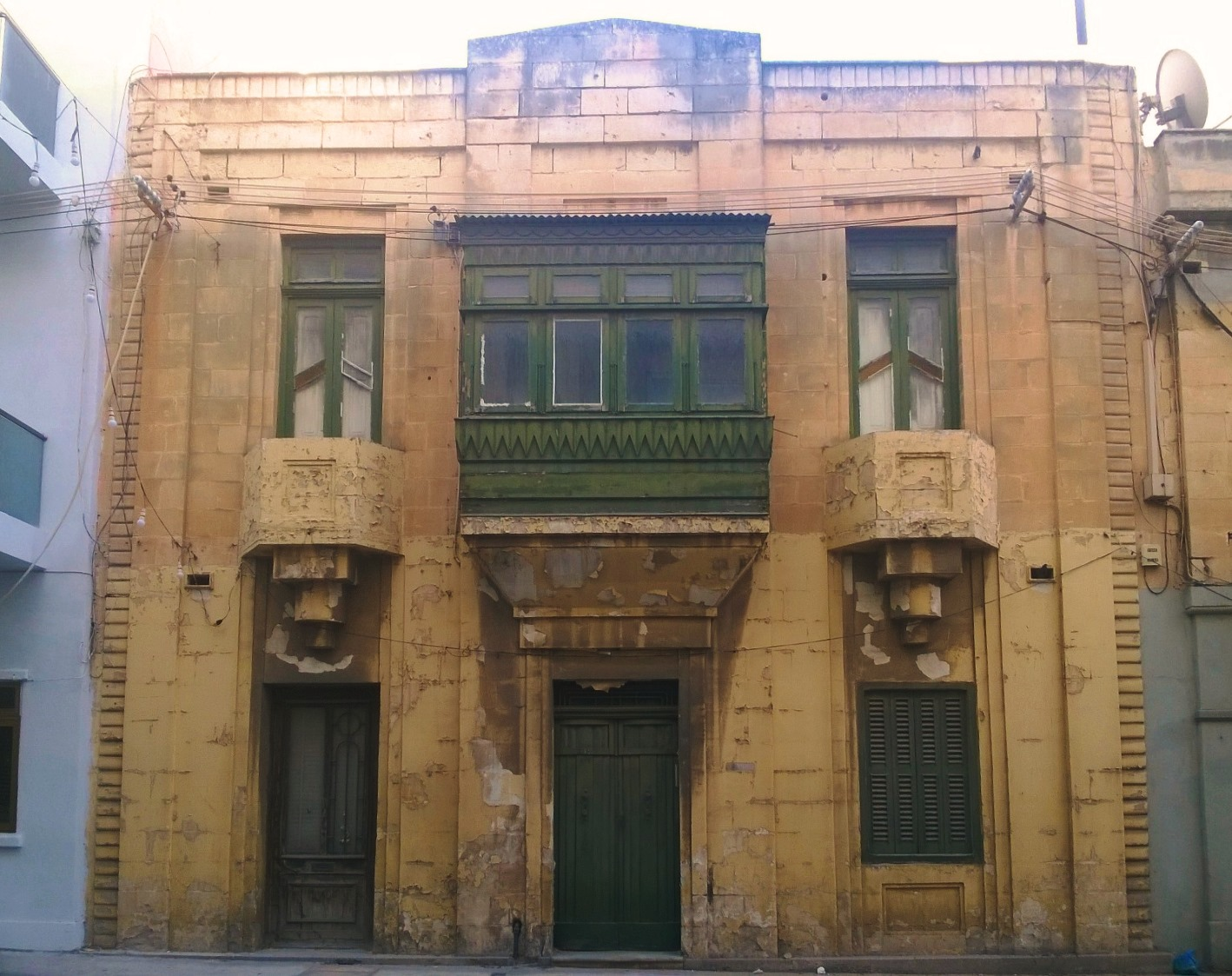
In Rue d'Argens, Gżira, a double front dwelling built in the interwar period by architect Prof Joseph Colombo as his private residence and shortlisted for the first architectural awards held in 1936, was given Grade 2 protection status. The PA said the building's elevation was exceptional in the way that the traditional townhouse had been reinterpreted in a modernist style making use of strong geometric motifs.

Gżira (Maltese: Il-Gżira) is a town in the Eastern Region of Malta. It is located between Msida and Sliema, also bordering on Ta' Xbiex. It has a population of 12,504 according to NSO 2024 figures. The word Gżira means "island" in Maltese, and the town is named after Manoel Island which lies to the east of Gżira, between the Sliema peninsula and Valletta. The seafront of Gżira has views of the walled city of Valletta, which is illuminated at night, forming a backdrop to Manoel Island, the yacht marina and a seafront public garden. The hamlet of Kappara is located close to Gżira. The Orpheum Theatre is located in Gżira.

== Town history ==
In the mid-19th century a villa was built in Gżira by Chevalier Jacob Tagliaferro. Slowly Gżira started developing into a working-class suburb of Sliema. Until the 1970s, Gżira had many bars, particularly the Snake Pit, Britannia and the Granada along and in proximity of the Strand, which economic activity ended when the British Service left Malta on 31 March 1979.

A regenerated Gżira is now host to a business community of hoteliers, restaurants, financial institutions, legal firms, online betting companies, real estate and offices amidst a multi-ethnic and multicultural community of residents. Since the last decade, Gżira had a real estate boom, and new buildings, mainly apartments, have replaced the old buildings.

As a result, much of the character and charm of the seafront houses has changed, although in the heart of Gżira there are still examples of traditional Maltese façades, with timber balconies (Gallarija) and bow-fronted, wrought iron balconies. The proliferation of modern apartments in Gżira as well as the development of high rise buildings, namely Metropolis and 14 East, led to an inflation of housing prices, as the town became sought after by both Maltese and foreigners.

Gżira's population has been fairly stable over the past few years, hovering around 12,504 according to National Statistics Office 2024 figures. It is known as being quite a multicultural town, with well-established and fairly integrated immigrant groups. . According to 2024 Malta's National Statistics Office figures, foreigners outnumber Maltese. Out of a total population of 12,054, foreigners amount to 7206, whilst 4848 are Maltese.

The main reason behind the area's popularity is that it is fairly centrally located in Malta, being close to the University of Malta, Sliema, and the capital Valletta. Service industries, commercial outlets and educational services are the town's main activities.

The crime rate in Gżira is very low, and the town is generally as safe as the rest of Malta and Gozo.

=== Religion ===
The Roman Catholic parish church of Gżira is also known locally as tal-Ġebla. Its literal translation means "of the stone", a reference to an incident which took place in Gżira on 10 July 1902. Three British drunken sailors, William Walls, Charles Thurbull and John Packhun, wanted to enter a bar, which at that time of day was closed. When Karmnu Brincat, the owner of the bar, refused to open, the sailors started throwing stones at the place. One of these stones hit a small shrine depicting a picture of Our Lady of Mount Carmel hanging outside the bar. The stone broke the glass of the frame, but did not make contact with the portrait itself, which remained intact. Notwithstanding the wind, the stone remained fixed within the broken glass.

The stone was removed by Anton Manché and taken to the Stella Maris Parish Church in Sliema, whose parish priest at the time was Francis Vincent Manché, the brother of Anton Manché.

For three days, prayers and services for reparation were held. Anton Anton Manché managed to set up a small chapel in Gżira where the small shrine was taken.

On 7 July 1913 Bishop Pietro Pace declared the chapel as a vice-parish.

On 15 May 1921, Bishop Don Mauro Caruana declared the chapel as a parish. Anton Anton Manché was the first parish priest of Gżira. The existing parish church was built between 1921 and 1935.

The second parish priest in the history of the Gżira parish was Carlo Manché, a man revered by many locals as a saint. He became parish priest of Gżira on 12 March 1935 until his death on 18 November 1950.

The frame, the broken glass and the stone that was thrown at the portrait of The Madonna have been very well preserved, and today they can still be seen at the parish church of Gżira.

The parish church of Gżira is dedicated to Our Lady of Mount Carmel, and its annual festa (village feast) is celebrated on the second Sunday of July.

== Sports ==
- Football
  - Empire Stadium (abandoned)
  - Gżira United F.C.
- Aquatic
  - National Pool Complex

== Health ==
- Clinic
  - Gzira Health Centre

== Education ==
- St Clare College, Dun Anton Manche, Gzira Primary School
- Antonio Bosio Secondary School
- Stella Maris College.
- St. Monica School

== Twin cities ==
Gżira has been twinned with Glyfada (Greece) and Wałbrzych (Poland).

== Artistic Monuments ==
- Ċrieki (Rings) Sculpture on The Strand promenade by Frans Galea (1945-1994) inaugurated in 1984.

== Historical Buildings ==
- Marshall Court
- Empire Stadium
- Orpheum Theatre
- Fort Manoel
- Lazzaretto
- Fawwara Gate
- Zammit Clapp Hospital aka Blue Sisters Hospital

== Zones in Gżira ==
- Village Core – area surrounding the Gżira Parish Church
- The Strand and Promenade
- Council of Europe Gardens, Gżira – a public garden
- Empire Stadium
- Gżira Marina
- Manoel Island

=== Manoel Island ===
Manoel Island in Gżira's Marsamxett Harbour, was originally known as l'Isola del Vescovo or il-Gżira tal-Isqof in Maltese (literally translated as "the Bishop's Island"). It was the property of the Mdina Cathedral. In 1643 Jean Paul Lascaris, Grandmaster of the Knights of Malta, constructed a quarantine hospital (Lazzaretto) on the island, in an attempt to control the periodic influx of plague and cholera. In 1675, another Grand Master, this time, Nicola' Cottoner, decided to construct another isolation hospital with an additional forty beds, a chapel and a cemetery.

The island was renamed after António Manoel de Vilhena, a Portuguese Grandmaster of the Knights of Malta under whose leadership Fort Manoel was built in 1726. Fort Manoel is considered a marvel of 18th-century military engineering. The original plans for the fort are attributed to Louis d'Augbigne Tigné, and are said to have been modified by his friend and colleague Charles François de Mondion, who is buried in a crypt beneath Fort Manoel. At one time, the Knights of Malta considered developing a walled city on Manoel Island, but instead they settled on a fort designed to house up to 500 soldiers. The fort has a magnificent quadrangle, parade ground and arcade, and once housed a baroque chapel dedicated to St. Anthony of Padua, under the direct command of the Order.

During World War II, Manoel Island and its fort were used as a naval base by the Royal Navy, at which time it was referred to variously as "HMS Talbot" or "HMS Phœnicia". The Chapel of St. Anthony was virtually destroyed following a direct hit by Luftwaffe bombers in March 1942.

As of November 2006, the historic fort was undergoing significant restoration and renovation works, and a new housing development was under construction on Manoel Island. The Manoel Island redevelopment project, however, has been heavily criticized due to its proximity to the island's important historical buildings. A guarded barrier some 300 yards after the bridge makes it clear that the public is not welcome on the largest part of the island.

== Notable residents ==
- Roberta Metsola - President of the European Parliament
- Ivan De Battista – actor
- Simone De Battista – actress
- Carlo Manché – 2nd parish priest
- Carmelo Scicluna O.B.E. aka Meme Scicluna (1887-1952) - owner and general manager of the Empire Sports Ground and the Empire Stadium.
- Joseph Colombo - architect
- Turu Rizzo (1894 - 1961) - waterpolo player and swimmer

== Street Names & Places. ==
Some street names bear the names of Colonial British Army Officers linked with Malta. These include:

- Sir William Reid
- Sir Frederick Ponsonby
- Sir Patrick Stuart
- Sir Charles Cameron
- Sir Henry Frederick Bouverie

There is also a street named about the British poet Samuel Taylor Coleridge

There are also streets names after important Maltese people (not necessarily from Gzira) including:

- Luqa Briffa - Great Siege (1565) Hero
- Nazju Ellul - Writer
- Reggie Miller - Trade Unionist
- Emmanuel Giordano

In Gzira one finds places named after Maltese people including:

- Pjazza Meme Scicluna
- Misrah Turu Colombo
