= John Forrest (disambiguation) =

John Forrest (1847–1918) was an Australian explorer and politician who served as the first Premier of Western Australia.

John Forrest may also refer to:

== People ==
- Jack Forrest (footballer, born 1878) (1878–?), Scottish footballer
- John Forrest (Victorian politician) (born 1949), Australian politician
- Jack Forrest (rugby league) (John Alexander Forrest) (1924–2016), New Zealand international
- John F. Forrest (1927–1997), U.S. Army general
- John Forrest (Canadian clergyman) (1842–1920), Presbyterian clergyman and educator
- John Forrest (physician) (1804–1865), British Military medical officer
- John N. Forrest (~1827–1867), an American slave jailor
- John Forrest (footballer) (born 1947), English footballer
- John Forrest (martyr) (1471–1538), friar and martyr
- John Forrest (producer), British radio and television producer
- John Forrest (rugby union) (1917–1942), Scottish rugby union international
- John Forrest (1931–2012), American-British actor and stage magician
- John Samuel Forrest (1907–1992), Scottish physicist, author and professor
- Sir John Forrest, 2nd Baronet, of the Forrest baronets of Scotland

== See also ==
- John Forrest National Park, Western Australia
- John Forrest Secondary College, Morley, Western Australia
- Jack Forrest (disambiguation)
- John Forest (disambiguation)
- John Forrest Dillon (1831–1914), American jurist
- John Forrest Kelly (1859–1922), Irish-born American electrical engineer
