= Jack Forrest =

Jack Forrest may refer to:

- Jack Forrest (footballer, born 1878) (1878–?), Scottish footballer
- Jack Forrest (footballer, born 1892) (1892–?), English footballer
- Jack Forrest (judge), Australian judge
- Jack Forrest (rugby league) (1924–2016), New Zealand rugby league player
- John F. Forrest (1927–1997), nicknamed Jack, American soldier
- Jack Forrest (basketball) (born 2000), American basketball player

== See also ==
- John Forrest (disambiguation)
