= Samuel S. Coursen =

U.S. Army officer (1926–1950)

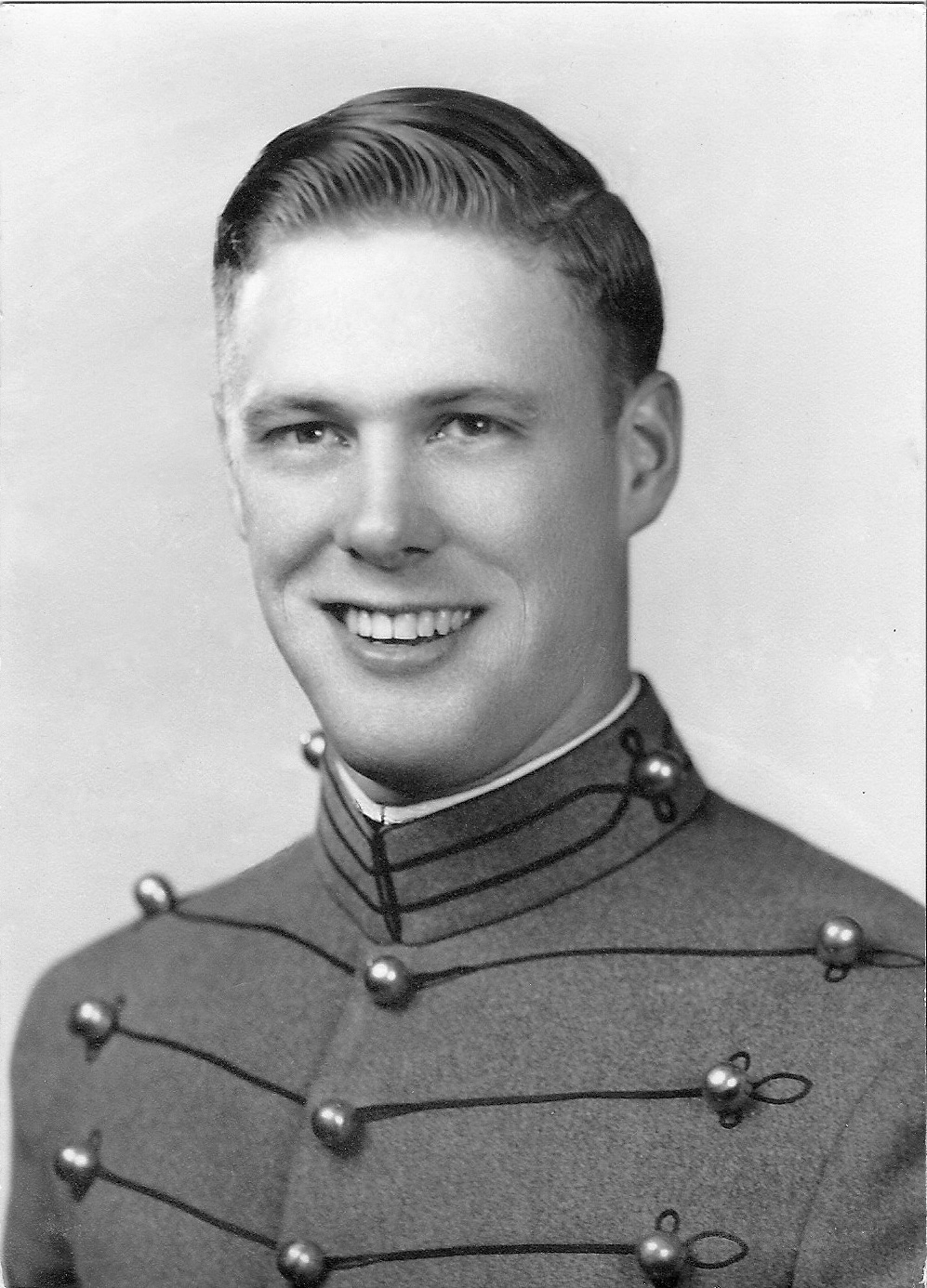
- Samuel S. Coursen, U.S. Military Academy class of 1949
- Born: August 4, 1926; Madison, New Jersey
- Died: October 12, 1950 (aged 24); Kumch'on Pocket, near Kaesong, Korea
- Burial place: U.S. Military Academy Cemetery, West Point, New York
- Military career
- Allegiance: United States of America
- Branch: United States Army
- Service years: 1949–1950
- Rank: First Lieutenant
- Nickname: Sam
- Units: Company C 5th Cavalry Regiment, 1st Cavalry Division
- Conflicts: Korean War; Battle of Pusan Perimeter; Pusan Perimeter Offensive; UN offensive into North Korea; Battle of the Kumch'on Pocket †
- Awards: Medal of Honor; Purple Heart

Samuel Streit Coursen (August 4, 1926 – October 12, 1950) was a 1949 graduate of the United States Military Academy and company commander in the United States Army during the Korean War.

He received the Medal of Honor posthumously for his actions on October 12, 1950.

== Youth and education ==
Coursen was born August 4, 1926, in Madison, New Jersey. His father, Wallace Melville Coursen, was a principal in the New York accounting firm of Haskins & Sells; his mother was the former Kathleen Howell. Coursen graduated in 1945 from Newark Academy where he was an accomplished athlete.

He was awarded an appointment to the United States Military Academy in 1945 and graduated with the class of 1949.

After graduation, Coursen married Evangeline Joy Sprague of Virginia Beach, Virginia and the daughter of U.S. Navy Captain Albert Sprague, then commander of the Navy Ammunition Depot at Lake Denmark, New Jersey.

== Early military career ==
Coursen was commissioned a second lieutenant of infantry in the Regular Army upon graduation from West Point. In August 1949, he attended the Officer's Basic Course of the Ground General School at Fort Riley, Kansas. By January 1950, Coursen was going through the Infantry Officer's Basic and Basic Airborne courses at Fort Benning, Georgia. In July 1950, he was en route to Far East Command. Promoted to first lieutenant in the Army of the United States, Coursen took command of a platoon of Company C, 5th Cavalry Regiment, 1st Cavalry Division on October 6, 1950. The 5th Cavalry fought in the Pacific theater during World War II and in the post-war years posted in Japan. The regiment was transferred to Korea in July 1950, weeks after the North Korean invasion that prompted the Korean War.

== Events leading to death ==
As more United Nations Command (UN) forces deployed to South Korea, they slowed the North Korean Korean People's Army (KPA) advance, holding out and maintaining the Pusan Perimeter in the southeast of the country. The Inchon landings on 15 September followed the next day by the UN breakout from the Pusan Perimeter forced the KPA to retreat. It was during this offensive that Coursen took his first combat command.

At the beginning of October the UN began its offensive into North Korea. At Kaesong the 1st Cavalry Division was ready to cross the 38th Parallel into North Korea. The 8th Cavalry Regiment, in the center, was to attack frontally from Kaesong to Kumch'on, 15 miles (24 km) north and along the main highway axis. The 5th Cavalry Regiment, Coursen's regiment, on the right, was to move east and then swing west in a circular flanking movement, designed to trap KPA forces south of Kumch'on. In the meantime, the 7th Cavalry Regiment, on the division's left, traversed the Ryesong River; advanced north on the road from Paekch'on to the small town of Hanp'o-ri, 6 miles (9.7 km) north of Kumch'on, where the main Pyongyang road crossed the Ryesong River; and established a blocking position. Defending the Kumch'on area north of Kaesong were the KPA 19th and 27th Divisions. The KPA 43rd Division, to the west, defended the Ryesong River crossing and the coastal area beyond the river.

At 09:00 on October 9, 1950, the 1st Cavalry Division as part of the Eighth United States Army struck out across the 38th Parallel. Initially, the advance was slow. Along the main highway the 8th Cavalry stopped repeatedly and waited for engineer troops to clear mines from the road. Halfway to Kumch'on the twelfth the regiment was halted by a KPA strongpoint, defended by tanks, self-propelled guns, and antiaircraft weapons. In spite of a sixteen-plane air strike and a 155-mm. howitzer barrage, the strongpoint held.

The 5th Cavalry Regiment, which also ran into trouble at the start, failed to cross the parallel until October 10, 1950. The next day the regiment's 1st Battalion encountered a KPA force holding a long ridge with several knobs—Hills 179, 175, and 174—that dominated a pass 15 miles (24 km) northeast of Kaesong. The infantrymen drove the defenders from the ridge during the afternoon of October 12, but the fight was fierce.

In the battle for Hill 174, Coursen observed that one of the men of his platoon had entered a well-hidden gun emplacement, thought to be unoccupied, and had been shot. Coursen ran to his aid and without regard for his personal safety, Coursen engaged the KPA in hand-to-hand combat in an effort to protect the wounded soldier until he himself was killed. When his body was recovered after the battle, seven KPA dead were found within the emplacement. Coursen's actions saved the wounded soldier's life and eliminated the main position of the enemy roadblock. For his actions, Lieutenant Coursen was awarded the Medal of Honor posthumously.

After much fighting, the 1st Cavalry Division captured Kumch'on on October 14, 1950. With US I Corps soldiers moving through the KPA's principal fortified positions between the 38th Parallel and Pyongyang, the North Korean capital city, KPA front lines as such ceased to exist. On October 19, Company F, 5th Cavalry, entered Pyongyang, followed shortly thereafter by the Republic of Korea Army 1st Division elements from the northeast. One of Company F's platoon commanders was one of Coursen's West Point roommates, Lieutenant John F. Forrest. The next morning, October 20, 1950, the 1st Division reached the heart of the city and took the strongly fortified administrative center without difficulty. The entire city was secured by 10:00 that day.

Coursen's West Point class of 1949 was greatly affected by the Korean War. Many of them were newly commissioned lieutenants serving as platoon commanders. Thirty of them would die in combat during the war.

Coursen was buried at the U.S. Military Academy Cemetery at West Point.

== Awards and decorations ==

Badge	Combat Infantryman Badge		
1st row	Medal of Honor		Purple Heart
2nd row	American Campaign Medal	World War II Victory Medal	National Defense Service Medal
3rd row	Korean Service Medal with 2 Campaign stars	United Nations Service Medal Korea	Korean War Service Medal
Badge	Parachutists Badge		
Unit awards	Presidential Unit Citation		Korean Presidential Unit Citation

== Award ==
On June 15, 1951, it was announced by The Pentagon that Coursen would be awarded the Medal of Honor. On June 21, 1951, Coursen's 14-month-old son, Samuel, Jr., of Morristown, New Jersey, was presented the award in a Pentagon ceremony by Joint Chiefs of Staff Chairman and General of the Army Omar N. Bradley.

== Medal of Honor citation ==
Rank and organization: First Lieutenant, U.S. Army, Company C 5th Cavalry Regiment, 1st Cavalry Division

Place and date: Near Kaesong, Korea, October 12, 1950

Entered service at: Madison, N.J. Born: August 4, 1926, Madison, N.J.

G.O. No.: 57, August 2, 1951.

Citation:

1st Lt. Coursen distinguished himself by conspicuous gallantry and intrepidity above and beyond the call of duty in action. While Company C was attacking Hill 174 under heavy enemy small-arms fire, his platoon received enemy fire from close range. The platoon returned the fire and continued to advance. During this phase 1 his men moved into a well-camouflaged emplacement, which was thought to be unoccupied, and was wounded by the enemy who were hidden within the emplacement. Seeing the soldier in difficulty he rushed to the man's aid and, without regard for his personal safety, engaged the enemy in hand-to-hand combat in an effort to protect his wounded comrade until he himself was killed. When his body was recovered after the battle 7 enemy dead were found in the emplacement. As the result of 1st Lt. Coursen's violent struggle several of the enemies' heads had been crushed with his rifle. His aggressive and intrepid actions saved the life of the wounded man, eliminated the main position of the enemy roadblock, and greatly inspired the men in his command. 1st Lt. Coursen's extraordinary heroism and intrepidity reflect the highest credit on himself and are in keeping with the honored traditions of the military service.

== Honors ==
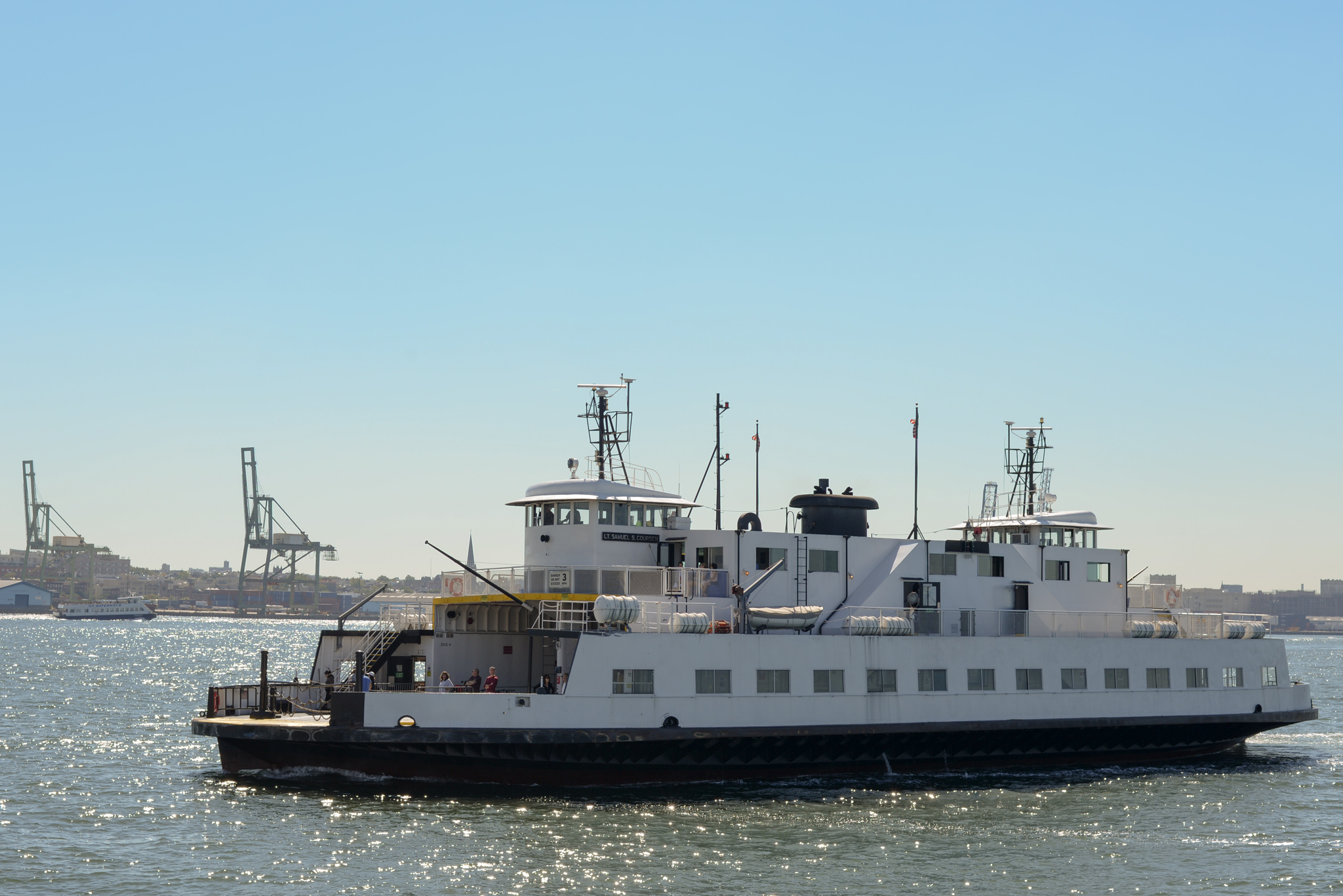
The Lt. Samuel S. Coursen ferry near Governors Island

- In early 1956, the U.S. Army christened a new 172 foot, 860 ton passenger and vehicle ferry the Lt. Samuel S. Coursen to operate in New York Harbor between Manhattan and the army post and First United States Army headquarters at Fort Jay, Governors Island, New York. In continuous service since, the ferry has carried heads of state visiting Governors Island and New York City including Queen Elizabeth II in her first visit as queen on October 21, 1957, and the King of Norway in a visit in the early 1990s. It also brought Soviet General Secretary Mikhail Gorbachev to a meeting with President Ronald Reagan and President-elect George H. W. Bush on December 7, 1988. When the Army departed from Governors Island in 1966, the ferry continued in service as the island became a headquarters base for the U.S. Coast Guard until 1997. The Coursen, now owned by the Trust for Governors Island, continues to provide passenger ferry service to Governors Island.
- In September 1951, Newark Academy renamed its athletic ground the Coursen Memorial Field (at its former Orange Avenue, Newark, NJ, campus). The name was kept for the new field when the school moved to Livingston in 1964.
- Coursen's name is on a bronze plaque in the U.S. Military Academy Museum listing graduates who have been awarded the Medal of Honor.
- Each Memorial Day, members of Baltusrol Golf Club play in the Lieutenant "Chick" Coursen Memorial Golf Tournament, the winner of which is awarded the Coursen Trophy.
- A rifle range at Fort Moore (formerly Fort Benning) is named Coursen Range.

== See also ==
- List of Medal of Honor recipients
- List of Korean War Medal of Honor recipients
