= John Forest (disambiguation) =

John Forest (1471–1538) an English Franciscan friar and martyr.

John Forest may also refer to:

- John Forest (priest), Dean of Wells, 1425–1446
- John Anthony Forest (1838–1911), Bishop of San Antonio
- John William De Forest (1826–1906), American soldier and writer

== See also ==
- John Forrest (disambiguation)
- John de Forest (1907–1997), English amateur golfer
