= Spinola Palace, St Julian's =

Maltese palace

Spinola Palace
- Palazz ta' Spinola
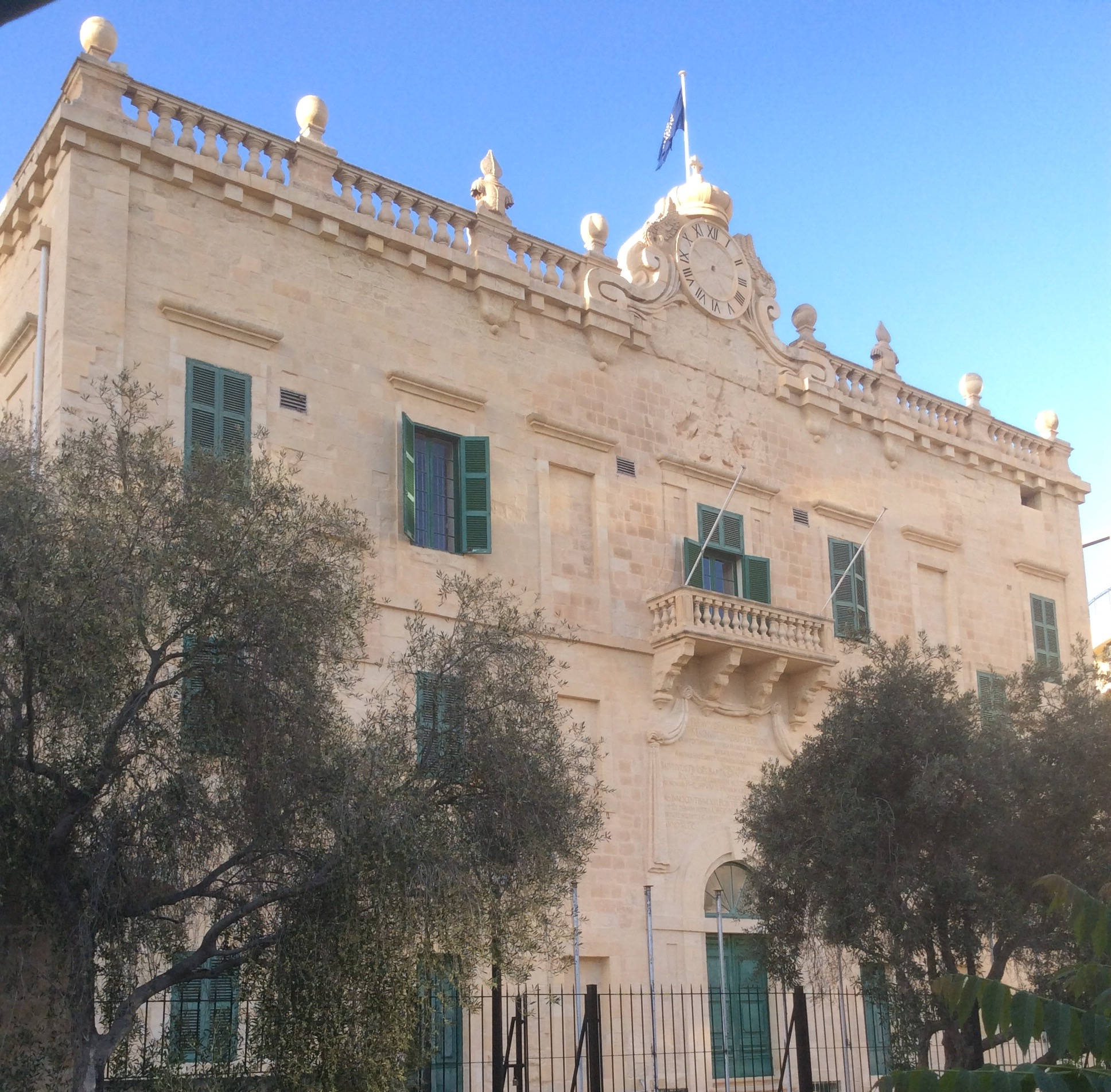
- View of the Spinola Palace
- Interactive map of the Spinola Palace area
- Former names: Forrest Hospital
- Alternative names: Palazzo Spinola; Spinola House; Villa Spinola

General information
- Status: Intact
- Type: Palace
- Architectural style: Baroque
- Location: St. Julian's, Malta
- Coordinates: 35°55′14.5″N 14°29′27.3″E
- Construction started: 1688
- Renovated: 1733

Technical details
- Material: Limestone
- Floor count: 3

Design and construction
- Architect: Romano Carapecchia

Spinola Palace (Maltese: Palazz ta' Spinola; Italian: Palazzo Spinola), also known as Spinola House and Villa Spinola, is a palace in St. Julian's, Malta. It was built in the 17th century by Fra Paolo Rafel Spinola, a knight of the Order of St. John, and was enlarged in the 18th century. The later construction was designed by Romano Carapecchia, which is considered a masterpiece, with its back having an elegant clock that is a unique feature to secular Baroque architecture in Malta.

The palace was adaptively converted to a military hospital, serving between 1860 and 1922, and was known as the Forrest Hospital. It later served for a number of purposes, including a post-World War II shelter for the homeless, a short-lived Museum of Modern Art and the Ministry for Tourism office. From late 2007 till 2021, the building hosted the Headquarters of the Parliamentary Assembly of the Mediterranean (PAM).

At the time of its construction, a number of ancillary buildings were also built. These consisted of a church, two boathouses, a belvedere and a building serving as stables. They still survive today belonging to different private owners, with the palace belonging to the Maltese government. Originally the building had large extensive gardens, including baroque gardens and wineyards, however these were minimized to an enclosed back garden and a small front public garden.

== History ==
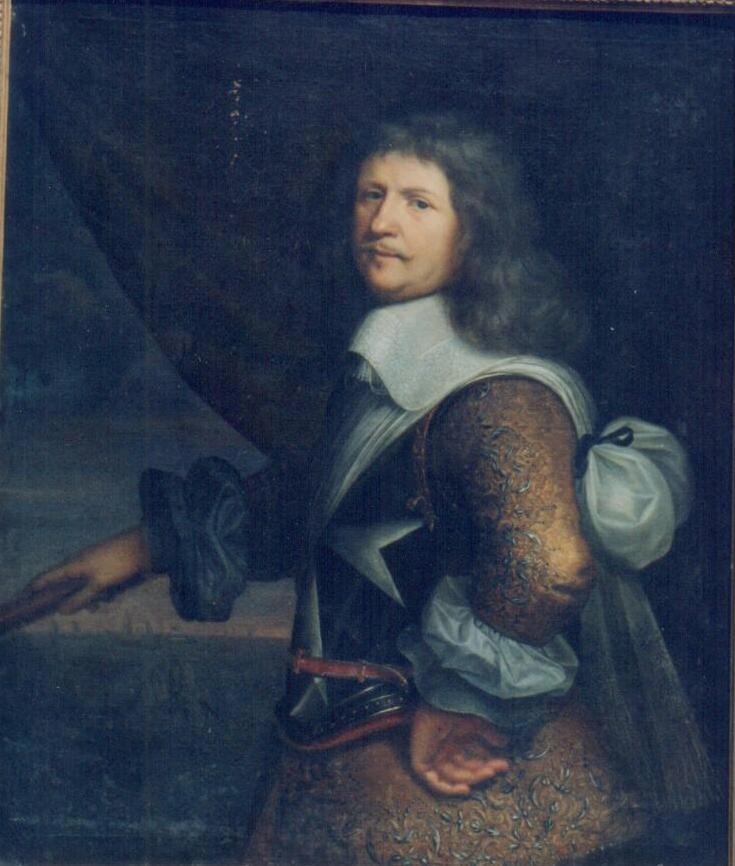
Fra Paolo Raffaele Spinola

The first Spinola Palace was built in 1688 by the knight Fra Paolo Raffaele Spinola, the Grand Prior of Lombardy. According to a Latin inscription above the main entrance, the palace and its surrounding gardens were built "for the people's recreation", and it was used for cultural activities. Since the building's erection on site it was occasionally the summer residence of the Grandmaster, generally for the celebration of the Ta' Lapsi Feast, and this was a tradition that was continued uninterruptedly throughout till the expulsion of the Order.

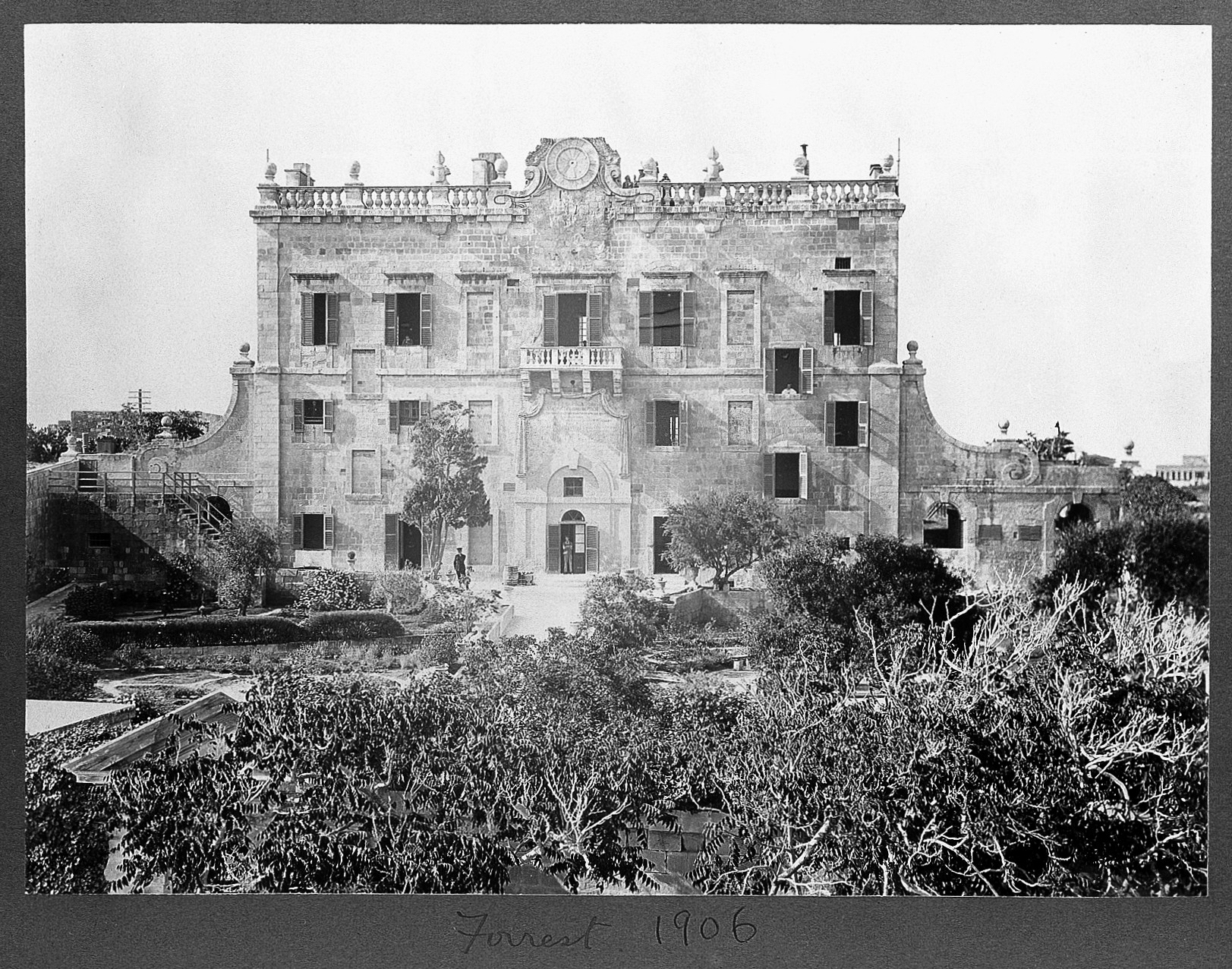
Spinola Palace in 1906, when it was a hospital

The palace was eventually passed on to Fra Giovanni Battista Spinola, the nephew of the original owner, and he enlarged and embellished it in 1733 under the direction of the architect Romano Fortunato Carapecchia. The palace was damaged during the French occupation of Malta in 1798, and the crown on top of the clock on the façade was symbolically destroyed, so as to signify the Order's expulsion from Malta. The palace was restored in 1826, and it was later acquired by the Church. In the 1830s it was used as a residence by Artist Charles Allingham (c.1778-1850).

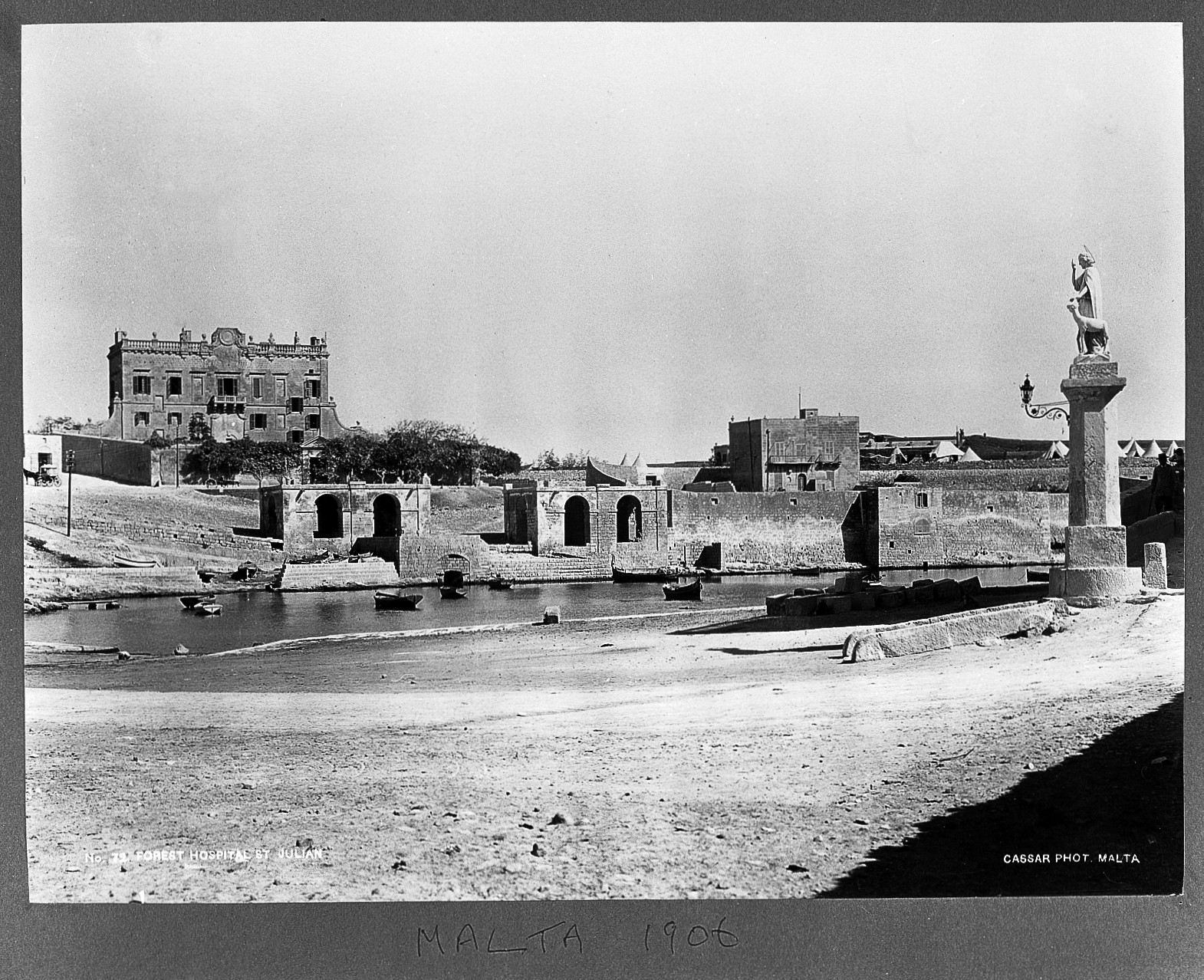

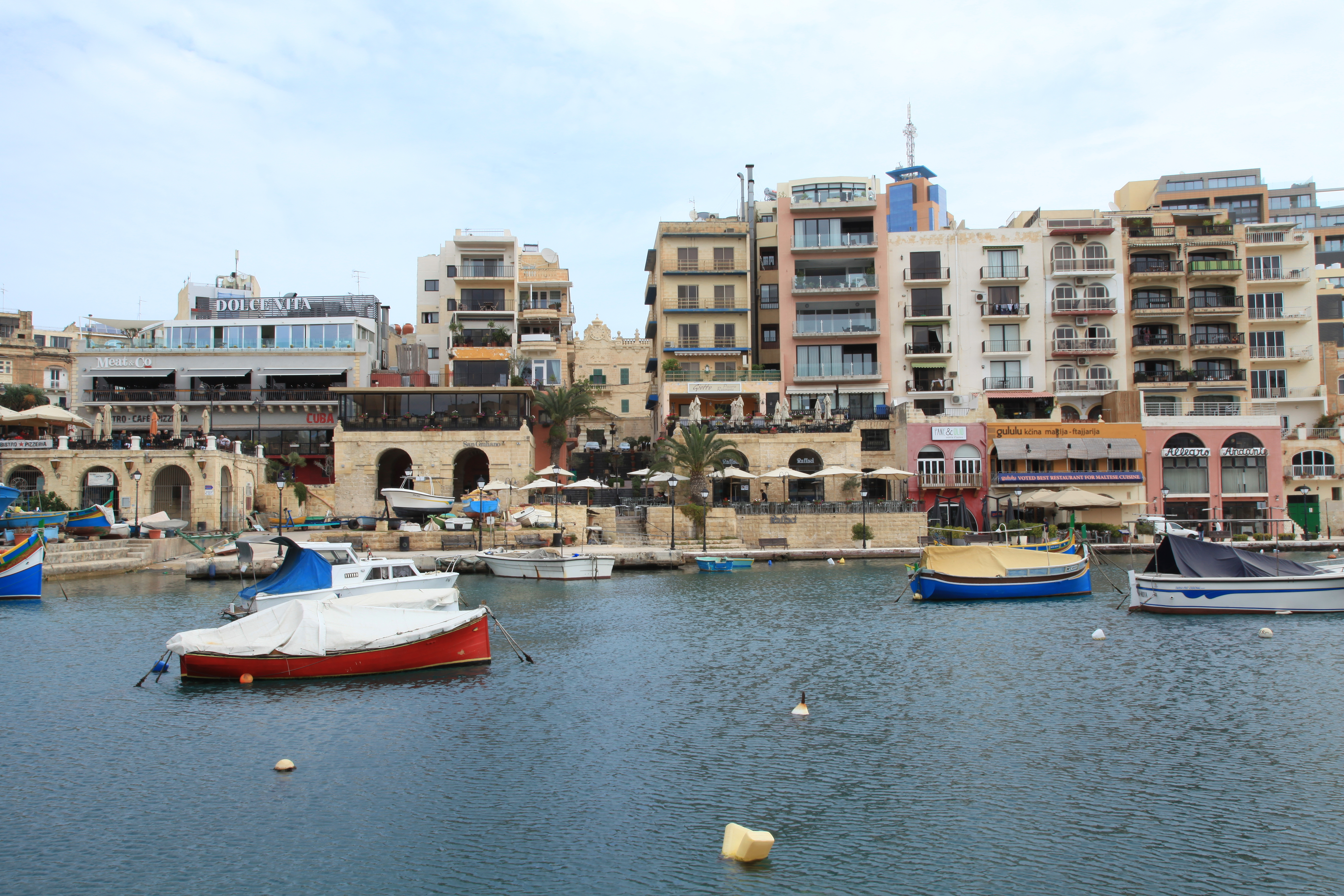
Views of Spinola Bay in 1906 and 2014 (compare the boathouses on the foreshore). The palace, once overlooking the bay, is now surrounded by modern buildings.

In 1860, the palace was leased to the British military for £20 a year. It was modified and converted into a military hospital, and was inaugurated as the Forrest Hospital in October of that year. It was also sometimes known as Forrest House, and was named for Dr. John Forrest who was the Inspector for Hospitals of the period. It served generally, but not exclusively, for soldiers suffering forms of venereal diseases and hosted at least twenty patients at a time. On a normal basis it could serve for 42-bedded patients, divided into nine wards at different floors, but during crisis it had served up to 186 patients at a time. Following the cholera epidemic of 1865, when three patients there died, a sanitary report asserted that the building, being a non-purposely built and antique residence, was not suitable as a hospital. Since its inauguration as a hospital until at least the end of the 19th century, the building had serious issues related to a bad drainage system and ventilation. By 1900 the accommodation at the hospital grew with the use of tents at its gardens. Improvements were carried out, and were ready by 1906, on the sewage system. The palace was still in use as a hospital in World War I. The building saw its end as a hospital in August 1922. This became only possible with a military hospital opening in Mtarfa.

It was included on the Antiquities List of 1935. In the 1940s, it was used as a shelter for people whose homes had been destroyed by aerial bombardment in World War II. The palace eventually fell into a state of disrepair, before being taken over by the government in 1975. It was restored between 1984 and 1986 when at this point it was projected to host the Museum of Modern Art at the upper floors, but after its opening it was unsuccessful at attracting a reasonable number of visitors. It appeared on a postal stamp circa 1991, with the missing crown. In 1996 plans were made for the building to be converted and be used by the Ministry for Tourism. The ministry started to operate from the building on 9 November 1998, but on 18 March 2002 the ministry was moved to Auberge d'Italie in Valletta. The Enforcement Directorate of the Malta Tourism Authority was then transferred there, using the palace as centre of operations until 2007. In July 2007, two MTA Enforcement Officials were assaulted just across the road from the palace while on duty. The building was restored once again between 2006 and 2007 and the crown on the clock, which had been missing since 1798, was reconstructed in 2012. Restoration work took place at different stages, the last was in 2013.

In late 2006 Malta submitted interest in hosting the Headquarters of the Parliamentary Assembly of the Mediterranean (PAM). For this purpose, the main areas of the palace were converted and put available for the parliament's requirements. It was inaugurated and handed over by Prime Minister of Malta Edward Fenech Adami on 22 November 2007. A plaque at the building was unveiled by Prime Minister Adami to commemorate this event. Between the night of 12 and 13 March 2009 unknown perpetrators have illegally entered the building causing damage to the premises and committing a robbery of a number of items used by the PAM. A renewal for a continuous use of the premises was signed on 10 December 2014, by the Minister for Foreign Affairs George William Vella and the President of the Parliamentary Assembly Francesco Maria Amoruso, at Palazzo Parisio in Valletta.

The building is not open to the general public, except its cellar, which houses L-Għonnella Restaurant. The palace was well known for its large amounts of wine secured in its cellars during the Order of St. John.

== Architecture ==
=== Palace ===
The palace is a large Baroque building with three stories. The façade contains a large sculpted clock under a crown. According to Giovanni Bonello, the palace is the very first building to hold a clock as a central feature and the only to have it on a non-religious baroque façade in Malta. The façade is generally lit at night. The palace is considered a masterpiece of Maltese architecture.

The palace stands on a hill with extensive views that were diminished over the years. It originally overlooked and gave its name to Spinola Bay. In the 20th century, the area surrounding the palace began to be built up, and today the palace is barely visible from the bay, being obscured by apartments and other modern buildings. Spinola Bay, formerly St. Julian's Bay, is now reputed for its number of prime restaurants and fine dining.

=== Gardens ===
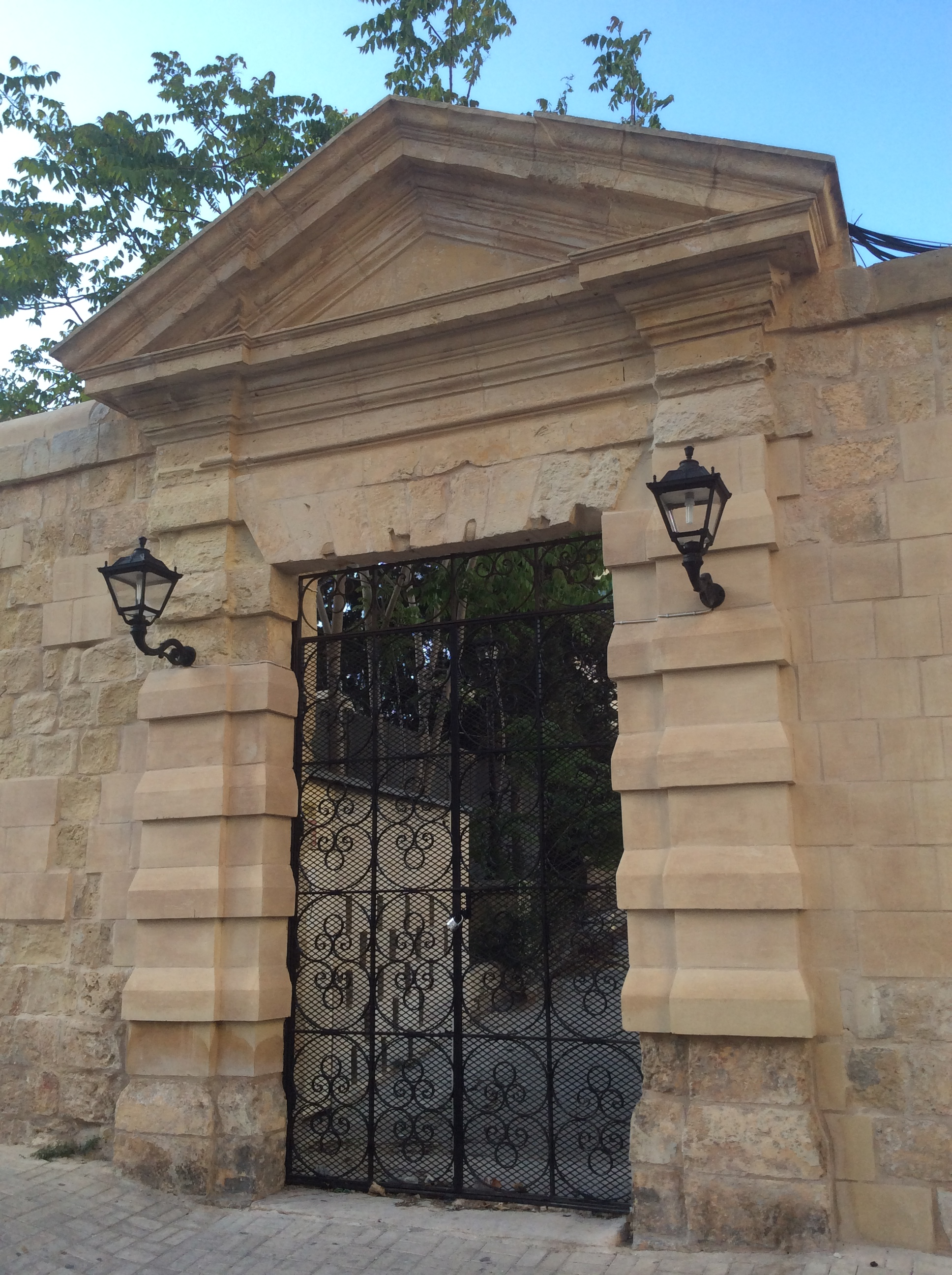
Gate to the palace's gardens

The palace originally was surrounded by large extensive gardens open for the entertainment of the public, but little remains of them. Part of the demolished gardens consisted of a wine yard. There are now two gardens, one at the front and one at the back, with only the front garden open to the public. The front garden was embellished by the Tumas Group between 2006 and 2007. During this renovation, the garden's Baroque character was retained, but a modern twist was added. It is prohibited to consume alcohol at any time at the garden. The private back garden is not accessible to the public and is enclosed by a high wall. They are named, and generally known, as the Spinola Gardens.

=== Church ===
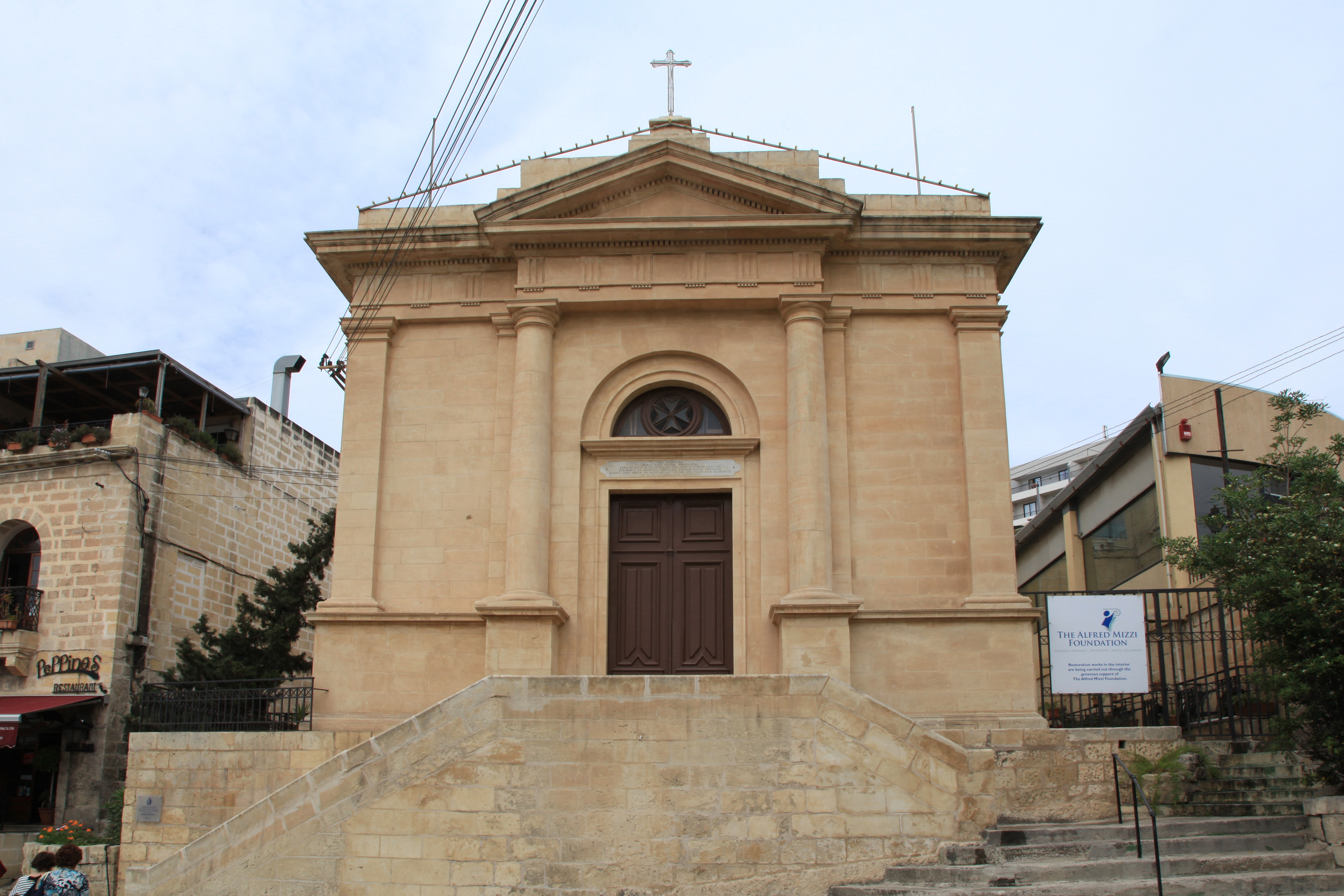
Church of the Immaculate Conception, with the rebuilt façade

When Fra Paolo Rafel Spinola built the palace, he also built a church dedicated to the Immaculate Conception nearby. The first stone of the church was laid on 16 June 1687, and it was consecrated on 10 September 1688. The church was enlarged and its façade was rebuilt in 1914. The church is on the list of the National Inventory of the Cultural Property of the Maltese Islands.

=== Boathouses ===
When the palace was built, two boathouses were constructed on the rocky shore of Spinola Bay. The boathouses are rather plain, and have two arches leading to a wide open area. The boathouses are now restaurants, with the one on the left called San Giuliano and the one on the right called Raffael. Both restaurants are managed by San Giuliano Catering Ltd.

=== Belvedere and stables ===
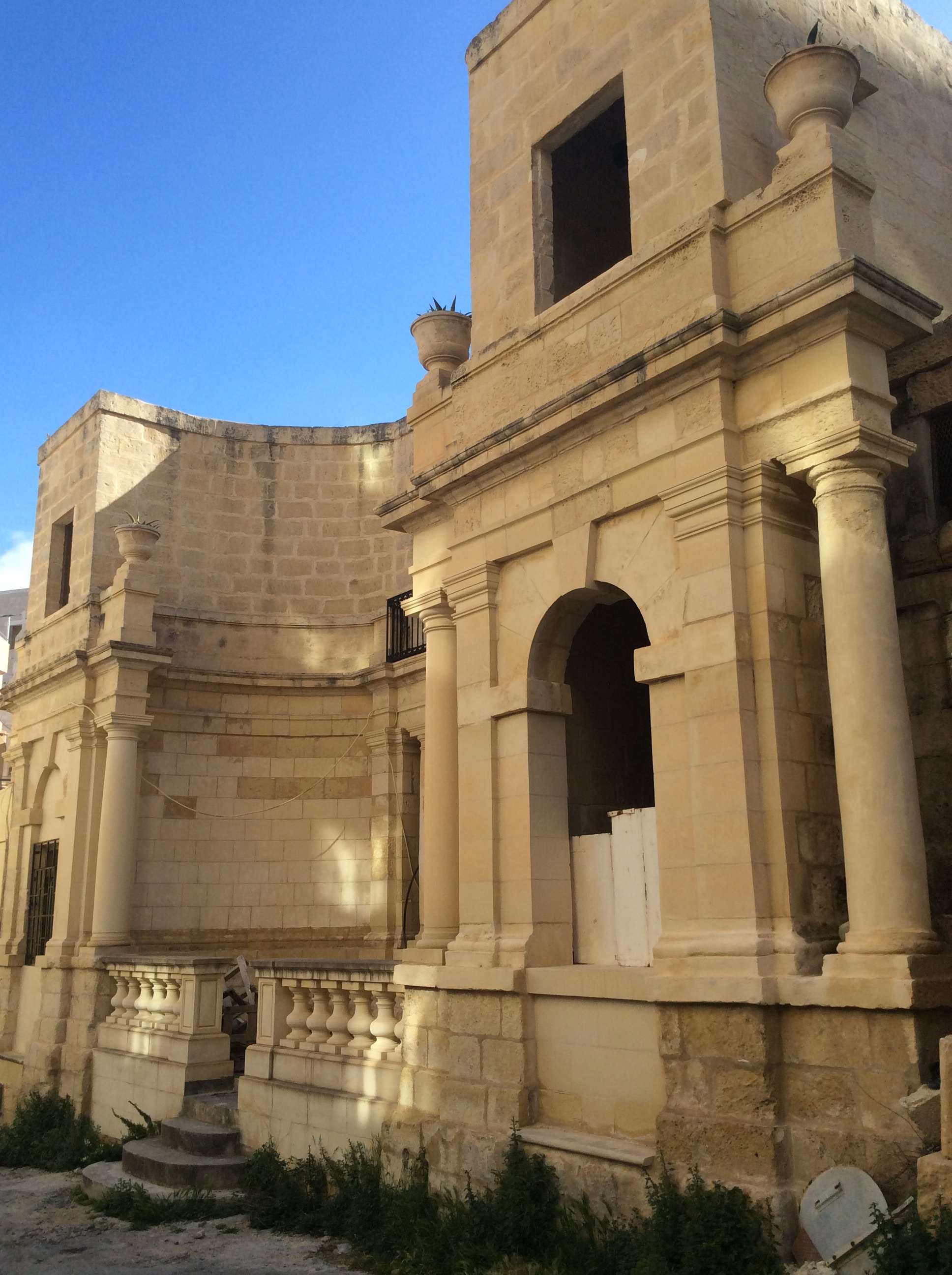
The Spinola Belvedere

Cut away from the palace's original garden is the Spinola Belvedere. Today the gardens on this side of the palace are built up with modern roads and housing estates. The belvedere is currently under renovation.

Along the way is the building of the stables that were restored in the 1990s to accommodate the Sardinella Restaurant and since 1993 has been occupied by a Pizza Hut restaurant, the first to open in Malta. A further refurbishment was carried in 2006, when the restaurant was given a blend combination of old and modern design. Pizza Hut celebrated their 20 years anniversary in Malta at the building in 2013.
