= John Forrest (physician) =

British military medical officer

John Forrest CB, QHP
- Born: 20 June 1804; Stirling, Scotland
- Died: 10 December 1865 (aged 61); Bath, England
- Resting place: Locksbrook Cemetery, Bath; 51.385181°N 2.385399°W
- Monuments: Forrest Hospital, St Julian's, Malta
- Occupation: British military medical officer
- Military career
- Allegiance: United Kingdom
- Branch: British Army
- Service years: 1825–1861
- Rank: Inspector-General of Army Hospitals
- Conflicts: Expedition against the Rajah of Kolapore; Expedition against the insurgent Boers beyond the Orange River; Kaffir War; Crimean War: Affair of Bulganac; Crimean War: Battle of Balaclava; Crimean War: Battle of Alma; Crimean War: Battle of Inkerman; Crimean War: Siege of Sebastopol
- Awards: South African Medal; Crimea Medal with clasps Alma, Inkermann and Sebastopol; Turkish Crimean Medal; Companion of the Order of the Bath; 4th Class Order of the Medjidie

John Forrest, CB, QHP (20 June 1804, Stirling, Scotland – 10 December 1865, Bath, England) was a British military medical officer.

Forrest dedicated 36 years of service to the Army Medical Staff, providing support to the British Army during numerous conflicts, including the Crimean War. He briefly held the position of overseeing Scutari Hospital where Florence Nightingale was stationed, and through his diligence and duty was made an Honorary Physician to the Queen. The Medical and Surgical Reporter hailed him as "one of the most distinguished medical officers of the British Army".

However, at the age of 18, as a student of medicine aiming to deepen his medical knowledge, he became involved in grave-robbing in his hometown of Stirling. He faced charges for this crime, along with the local gravedigger and cemetery key keeper who were detained. He fled the country and was subsequently declared an outlaw. Although his accomplices were initially released, this action incited a riot in the town, compelling authorities to return them to jail for their own safety. A year later, Forrest received a pardon from the King, thanks to a successful petition by his Brother in law. The petition pleaded for clemency based on Forrest's age and his circumstances at the time of the crime.

== Childhood and education ==
John Forrest was born on 20 June 1804 in Stirling, Scotland, the son of John Forrest, a physician, and Elizabeth Glas.

In 1822, when he was a student of medicine at Edinburgh University Forrest was involved in the removal of the body of Mary Witherspoon (née Stevenson) from Stirling Churchyard. (Note: Before the Anatomy Act 1832, the only legal supply of corpses for anatomical purposes were those condemned to death and dissection by the courts. While in the 1700s, hundreds had been executed for trivial crimes, by the 19th century only approximately 50 people were being hanged each year. With the expansion of the medical schools and private anatomical schools, as many as 500 cadavers were needed. This led to body snatching to fill the shortfall. Stealing a corpse was a misdemeanour at common law, not a felony, and was therefore only punishable with fine and imprisonment, rather than transportation or execution. The trade was a sufficiently lucrative business to run the risk of detection, particularly as the authorities tended to turn a blind eye to what they considered a necessary evil.) The crime was discovered, and John, along with James Shiels, a street sweeper; Daniel Mitchell, a servant and changekeeper; and James McNab, the local gravedigger, were implicated as the culprits.

A trial was held at the Stirling Spring Circuit Court on 19 April 1823; however, Forrest had absconded and was absent from the hearings. He was assumed to be heading for Paris while McNab and Mitchel were held prisoners in the Stirling Tolbooth. The court documents do not mention Shiels, however. The crime had been discovered when the grave of Mary Stevenson, wife of Joseph Witherspoon, that had been dug only a week before, was observed to be a couple of inches below the surface. A rope was discovered near the surface, and digging down to the coffin revealed it had been broken open and the body removed; however, the clothes had been thrown back inside. (Note: One method body-snatchers used was to dig at the head end of a recent burial, digging with a wooden spade (quieter than metal). When they reached the coffin they broke it open, put a rope around the corpse and dragged it out. They were careful not to steal anything such as jewellery or clothes as this would leave them open to a felony charge.)

In McNab's statement, he described Forrest as the ring-leader who had approached him a number of times trying to persuade him to assist in the removal of bodies from the church yard, offering him up to four guineas per body. In McNab's role as the church gravedigger he would have held the keys to the churchyard, which would be of great use in such a crime. Although McNab admitted being with Forrest, Mitchel, and Shiels on the night before the crime was discovered, he protested his innocence and claimed the crime was conducted after he left the group.

Mitchel's statement supports the claim that Forrest had offered a number of times three or four guineas for assistance in the removal of bodies from the graveyard. Mitchel also mentions one of Forrest's accomplices being "a tallish man with a great white coat with a number of capes and whom he heard to be called Mr Johnston from Edinburgh". This man was not located and assumed to be a fictitious character. (Note: The character described could have been John Forrest's brother-in-law Dr. Alexander Johnston. Johnston was married to John's elder sister Marion and was four years older than John. He had obtained his degree at Edinburgh University and it could be assumed he was still living there and so fitting the description of "Mr Johnston from Edinburgh". The "white coat" may imply a doctor's outfit, however prior to the late 19th century doctors actually wore black.)

Mitchel goes on to describe how Forrest had offered him a large amount of whisky, and so being intoxicated, he agreed to go with him, McNab, and Shiels to the churchyard where Mr. Johnston gave him a pound note (which he admits he split with Shiels the following day). However, Mitchel denied assisting with the crime, saying he left immediately afterwards.

As all evidence pointed towards Forrest being the principal offender in the case and that he had absconded, the court decreed that he should be declared an outlaw. Outlawry was one of the harshest criminal penalties, as the eighteen year old Forrest would no longer be protected by the legal system, and anyone could commit a crime against him (including murder) without any punishment. To be declared an outlaw was to suffer a form of civil or social death, as the outlaw was debarred from all civilized society. No one was allowed to give him food, shelter, or any other sort of support—to do so was to commit the crime of aiding and abetting, and to be in danger of the ban oneself. As such, Forrest could not return to his family home in Stirling and had to support himself entirely.

The Lord Advocate also decided that because Forrest was absent, the trial against McNab and Mitchel, who had merely been acting as agents, was halted pro loco et tempore. In Scots law this phrase refers to a case where the trial is stopped but the prosecution retains the right to bring a fresh indictment against the accused. They were freed from jail; however, this incensed the local populace who formed an angry mob and started to riot in the streets. The 77th Regiment was brought down from the Castle to disperse the rioters who fired on the mob in Spittal Street, but no-one was injured, the soldiers intentionally firing over the people's heads. For their own safety, McNab and Mitchel had to take refuge in the jail they had just been released from.

In spite of his outlaw status, Forrest continued his education at the University of Edinburgh, and in 1823 he became a licentiate of Royal College of Surgeons of Edinburgh.

In June 1824, Forrest's brother-in-law, Robert Adie, submitted a "memorial" (a petition) to the King to pardon Forrest. This included an assumption of guilt of the crime but pleaded clemency on a number of factors including:- Forrest's age at the time of the crime - being vulnerable to the influence of others; the fact his father had died only a month before the crime took place; the impact of Forrest's outlawry on his widowed mother; the state of anxiety Forrest had been suffering since his conviction - being rendered a fugitive not protected by the Law; and that another trial could stir up public emotions again as it did previously. Adie also included a number of testimonials from distinguished medical teachers and responsible inhabitants of Stirling attesting to Forrest's good character and diligence as a student. One such character reference included the fact that Forrest had been providing medical assistance to the poor of Edinburgh:

I hereby certify that Mr John Forrest attended my Lectures on Anatomy and Physiology in the winter of 1821 and Spring of 1822, also in the Winter of 1822 and Spring of 1823. That during these courses he was a diligent and faithful attendant. I also certify that Mr Forrest has attended many of the poor people who apply to me for medical assistance, with an attention and humanity that do him the highest credit. There is no young gentleman on whom I would devote the charge of patients with greater confidence.

The Petition was successful as on 22 June 1824 Forrest was granted a free pardon by the King.

Forrest continued his education and, in 1825 was awarded a Doctorate from Edinburgh University. His dissertation, written in Latin, was on the subject of gangrene.

== Early military career ==
Much of Forrest's military career is documented in his obituary in the British Medical Journal:

Forrest joined the British Army as a Hospital Assistant on 10 November 1825. Through his diligence, he was promoted to Assistant Surgeon in the 20th Regiment of the Foot on 9 February 1826. This period of history was relatively peaceful, and regiments were posted around the British Colonies to ensure order was maintained. The 20th Regiment was based in India and Forrest was involved in the expedition against the Rajah of Kolapore in 1827.

On 3 September 1829, Forrest was transferred into the 23rd Regiment of Foot where he was attached until 11 October 1831, when he transferred to the 8th West India Regiment of Foot.

Forrest transferred into the hospital staff in St. Ninians, Scotland, on 9 July 1832, where he remained for a number of years. There he married, on 7 March 1839, Ann Mclachlan daughter of Captain Donald Mclachlan. The following month they left Stirling with Captain Donald and family in the barque Arione and journeyed to the Cape of Good Hope, South Africa, where Forrest and his new wife disembarked. Her father and family continued to Australia, reaching Port Phillip towards the end of 1839, where they settled.

Forrest was promoted to surgeon of the 2nd class in the 75th Regiment of Foot where he was attached from 2 July 1841 until 13 May 1842 when he transferred to the hospital staff in Cape Town.

Whilst in Cape Town, Forrest and his wife Ann had two children, Mary Anne (born 1840) and John (born 2 February 1841). However, Ann died soon after on 1 August 1842 and was buried at St George’s Anglican Church, Cape Town on 2 August 1842.

Forrest's role as hospital staff in Cape Town included involvement in the expedition against the insurgent Boers beyond the Orange River in 1845, and in the Kaffir War of 1846, for which he received the South African Medal.

He also became the Medical Attendant to Lady Sarah Maitland (1792–1873), daughter of the Duke of Richmond, and wife of Sir Peregrine Maitland. Sir John Hall describes Forrest in a letter dated 17 January 1847:

Dr Forrest, who belongs to the Medical Staff here, and has made a good deal of money, I hear, by private practice, is indignant at being passed over by Atkinson, who is junior to him in the Service, and is going to make an application to return home on account of his health, to which I suppose I shall be compelled to give my assent. The other day he sent a regular reprimand to Sir James McGrigor for overlooking his individual merits, and promoting a junior Officer over his head, which he sent to me for transmission home. I, of course, returned it to him with a message that, however much he fancied Sir James deserved censure for the promotion he had made, I was not the channel through which such a communication should pass, but that if I could forward his views in getting an exchange, or even promotion, it would afford me much pleasure. It was rather a knowing dodge of the canny Scot, as all Sir James's anger would have fallen on me, and very properly, for transmitting such a document; but I have been severely bitten once by one of his countrymen for my good nature, and I will forgive the next who persuades me to commit myself again for his advantage.

On 21 May 1850, Forrest was promoted to Surgeon of the First Class and served as hospital staff in Glasgow and Chatham, Kent.

== Crimean War ==
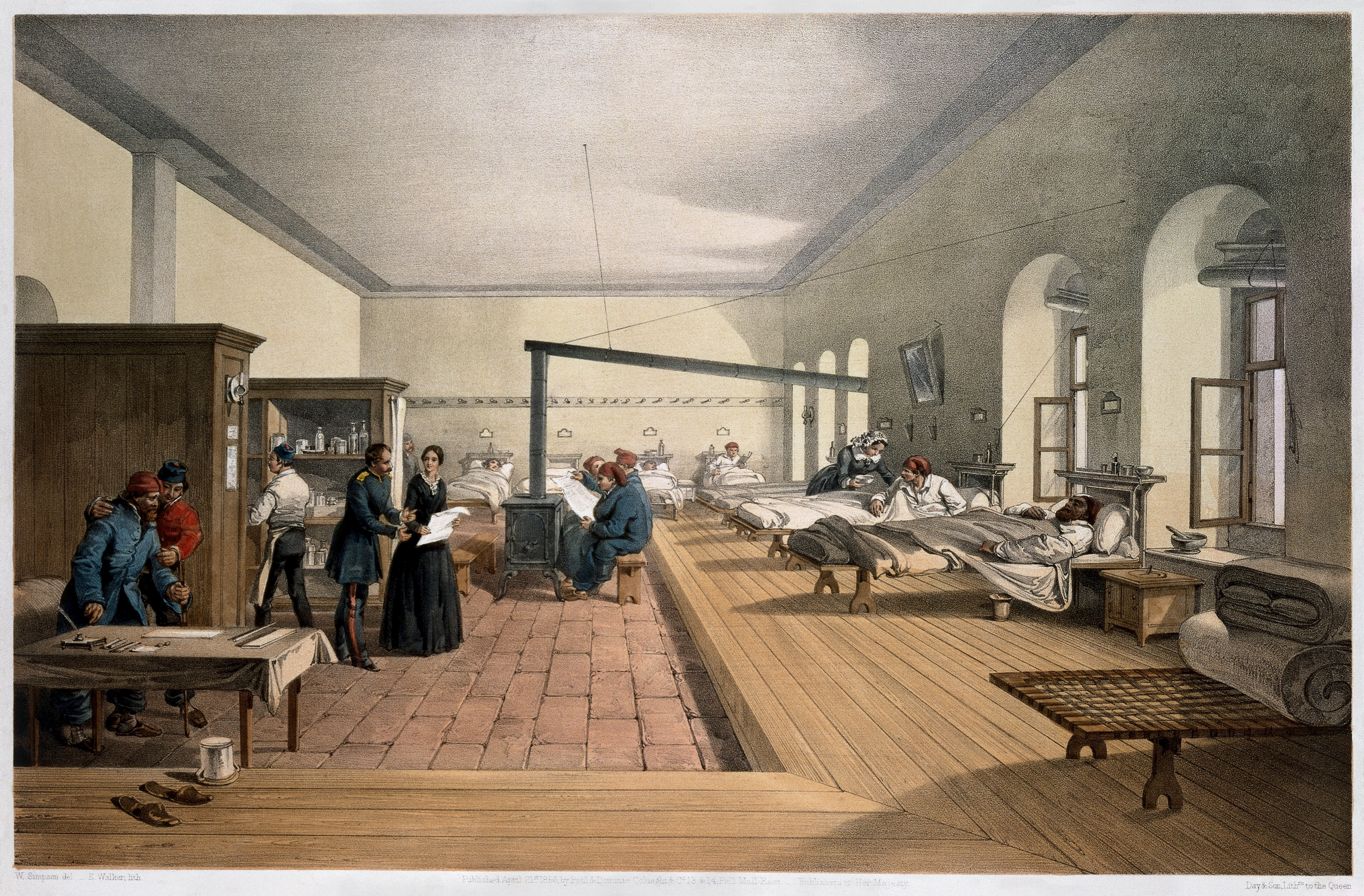
Lithograph of the hospital at Scutari

On 28 March 1854, Forrest was promoted to Deputy-Inspector of Army Hospitals and on 13 April 1854 was ordered to be in medical charge of the 3rd division of the Eastern army in Gallipoli and Bulgaria, accompanying the expedition to the Crimea on 17 September 1854.

In his capacity of Principal Medical Officer, Forrest was present at the affair of Bulganac, capture of Balaklava, battles of the Alma and Inkerman, and siege of Sebastopol. Forrest was noted in Lord Raglan's despatch after the Battle of Inkerman, "for his able exertions, as deserving to be most honourably mentioned".

In December 1854, he was posted to Scutari hospital. One of the junior doctors in his division, George Lawson, wrote a letter home describing his high opinion of Forrest:

You will be surprised to hear that Dr Forrest has left us. He received orders to proceed to Scutari to take the Medical Superintendance of that station. The Scutari Hospital has been much grumbled at, and from the number of sick now rapidly being sent down there, it requires a man of good capabilities to take charge. Had he been there before there would never have been a complaint against the place ... He has kindly promised to have me removed there, but this I am obliged to keep to myself, as it requires some management to be sent down. I shall first get sent down to Scutari with wounded and sick, and he will detain me there and give me, I have asked of him, one of the surgical wards.

It was not long before the extent of the conditions at Scutari became clear to Forrest, as described in his letter to John Hall on 4 January:

I fear that this place will prove too much for me. There are now three large Hospitals open containing close upon 5000 sick. Two Staff Surgeons are ill with fever I shall therefore require to replace them, and also a 1st Class Staff Surgeon to superintend the Sultans Palace Hospital, and an Hospital about to be opened over the East stables – calculated to contain 70 patients.

Florence Nightingale, a nurse at Scutari who worked hard to make improvements for the overworked staff against official indifference, wrote of Forrest in her letter to Sidney Herbert on 8 January 1855, stating:

I beseech you to keep this letter to yourself, while making enquiries to which it may lead you. The Commission has done nothing – probably its powers were limited to enquiry. Cumming has done nothing. Lord Wm Paulet has done nothing. Lord Stratford, absorbed in politics, does not know the circumstances. Lord Wm. Paulet knows them, but partially. Menzies knows them & will not tell them. Wreford knows them & is stupified. The Medical Officers, if they were to betray them, would have it 'reported personally & professionally to their disadvantage'. Lord Wm. Paulet & Dr Forrest the new Medical Head, I see, are desperate.

The conditions are revealed also in a letter dated 16 January from Forrest to John Hall:

We are going on very quietly here. Miss Nightingale & Co have not disturbed me. I hope you will not send any more sick down here until our numbers are reduced, as there is no room for them in the hospitals – the weather here is very stormy and I pity the troops in camp with all my heart – their sufferings must be great and I can see nothing before them but certain death.

Forrest had contracted a severe illness, and unable to remain at his post, he resigned. His letter to Hall on 23 January stated:

I am sorry I find I must divert to England for a change in climate as I am quite unfit to carry on duty here. Lawson and others seem to think there is serious disease of the kidney going on and I daresay they are right.

Forrest was granted a medical certificate and returned to England on 26 January 1855.

Forrest was awarded the Crimea Medal with three clasps, which was personally presented to him by Queen Victoria at the presentation ceremony on Horse Guards Parade, London, 18 May 1855. He was also awarded the Turkish Crimea Medal.

== Later career ==
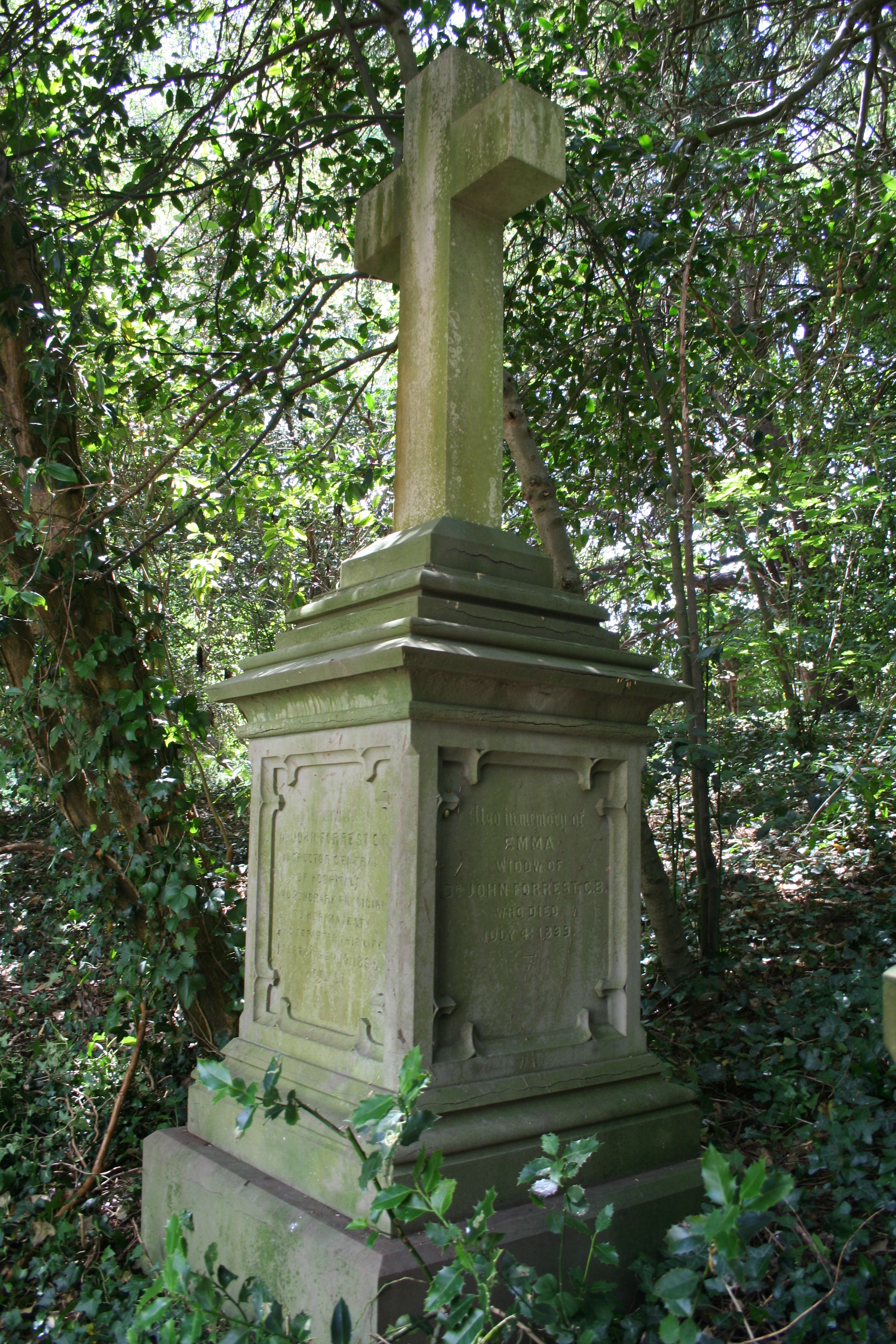
Gravestone of John Forrest, Locksbrook Cemetery, Bath

Forrest spent much of the remaining time in service as Principal Medical Officer stationed in Malta. He was made an Ordinary Member of the Military Division of the Third Class (Companion of the Order of the Bath) on 5 February 1856 and received the fourth-class Order of the Medjidie on 2 March 1858 for his efforts in the Crimean War.

Forrest remarried on 12 August 1858 in Gibraltar, Emma Jenkin, daughter of George H. Jenkin.

He was promoted to Inspector-General of Army Hospitals on 31 December 1858, and shortly after on 16 November 1859, was given the title Honorary Physician to the Queen.

In 1860, the hospital at Villa Spinola in St. Julian's was adapted into a 42-bed army hospital to serve the newly opened barracks at Pembroke and by serving as a sanatorium to absorb some of the overflow from Valletta General Hospital. This hospital was named Forrest Hospital after Forrest.

Forrest died at 10 Queens Parade in Bath, Somerset, on 10 December 1865, leaving £8,000 to his daughter Mary Anne, £5,000 to his second wife Emma, and the remaining £5,000 of his estate to his son John. He is buried at Locksbrook Cemetery, Bath.

== Career timeline ==
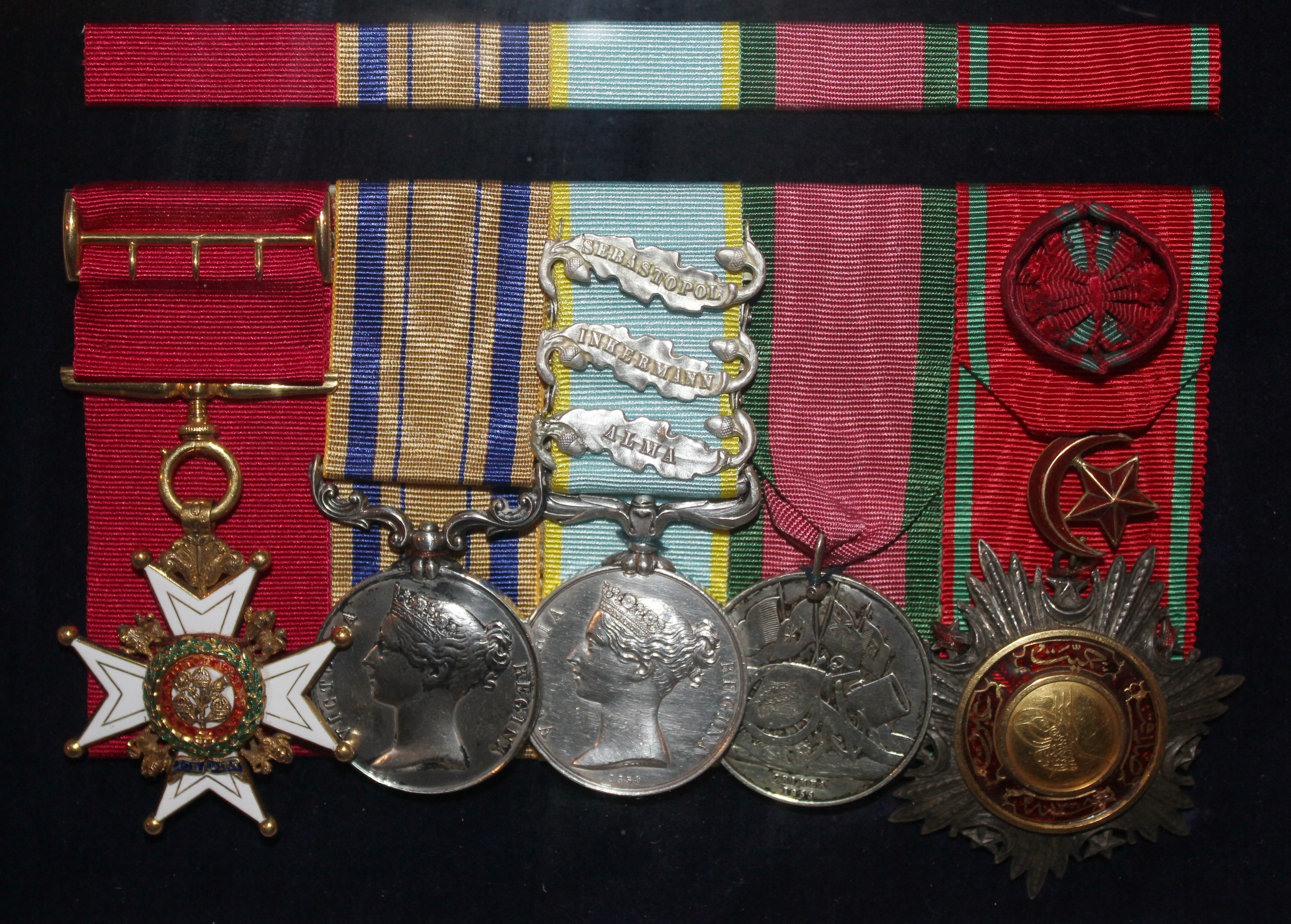
Medals awarded to Forrest

Date	Position	Attached
10 November 1825	Hospital-Assistant to the Forces	
9 February 1826	Assistant Surgeon	20th Regiment of Foot
3 September 1829	Assistant Surgeon	23rd Regiment of Foot
11 October 1831	Assistant Surgeon	8th West India Regiment of Foot
9 July 1832	Assistant Surgeon	Hospital Staff
2 July 1841	Surgeon	75th Regiment of Foot
13 May 1842	Surgeon	Hospital Staff
30 April 1847	Surgeon	91st Regiment of Foot
21 May 1850	Surgeon Major	Hospital Staff
28 March 1854	Deputy Inspector-General of Hospitals	3rd Division of Eastern Army
31 December 1858	Inspector-General of Hospitals	
9 November 1861	Placed on Half-Pay	
