= John F. Forrest =

United States Army general

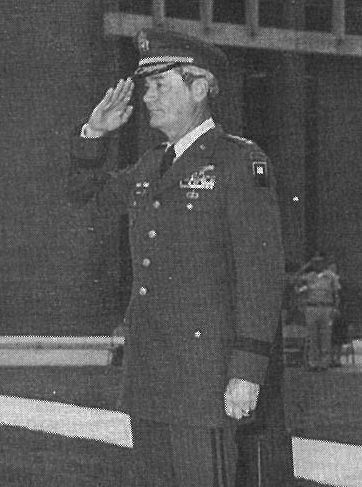
- Lieutenant General John F. Forrest assumes command of the First Army, Fort Meade Maryland, October 1979
- Born: June 20, 1927; Mexia, Texas
- Died: May 27, 1997 (aged 69); Colorado Springs, Colorado
- Military career
- Allegiance: United States
- Branch: United States Army
- Service years: 1949–1983
- Rank: Lieutenant General
- Nickname: Jack
- Commands: First United States Army; 4th Infantry Division; 1st Brigade, 2nd Armored Division; 3rd Battalion, 187th Infantry Regiment
- Conflicts: Korean War; Vietnam War
- Awards: Army Distinguished Service Medal; Silver Star (3); Legion of Merit (2); Bronze Star Medal (4)
- Other work: United States Space Foundation; Colorado Springs City Council

John Franklin "Jack" Forrest (June 20, 1927 – May 27, 1997) was a career officer in the United States Army and a combat commander during the Korean War and Vietnam War.

== Early life ==
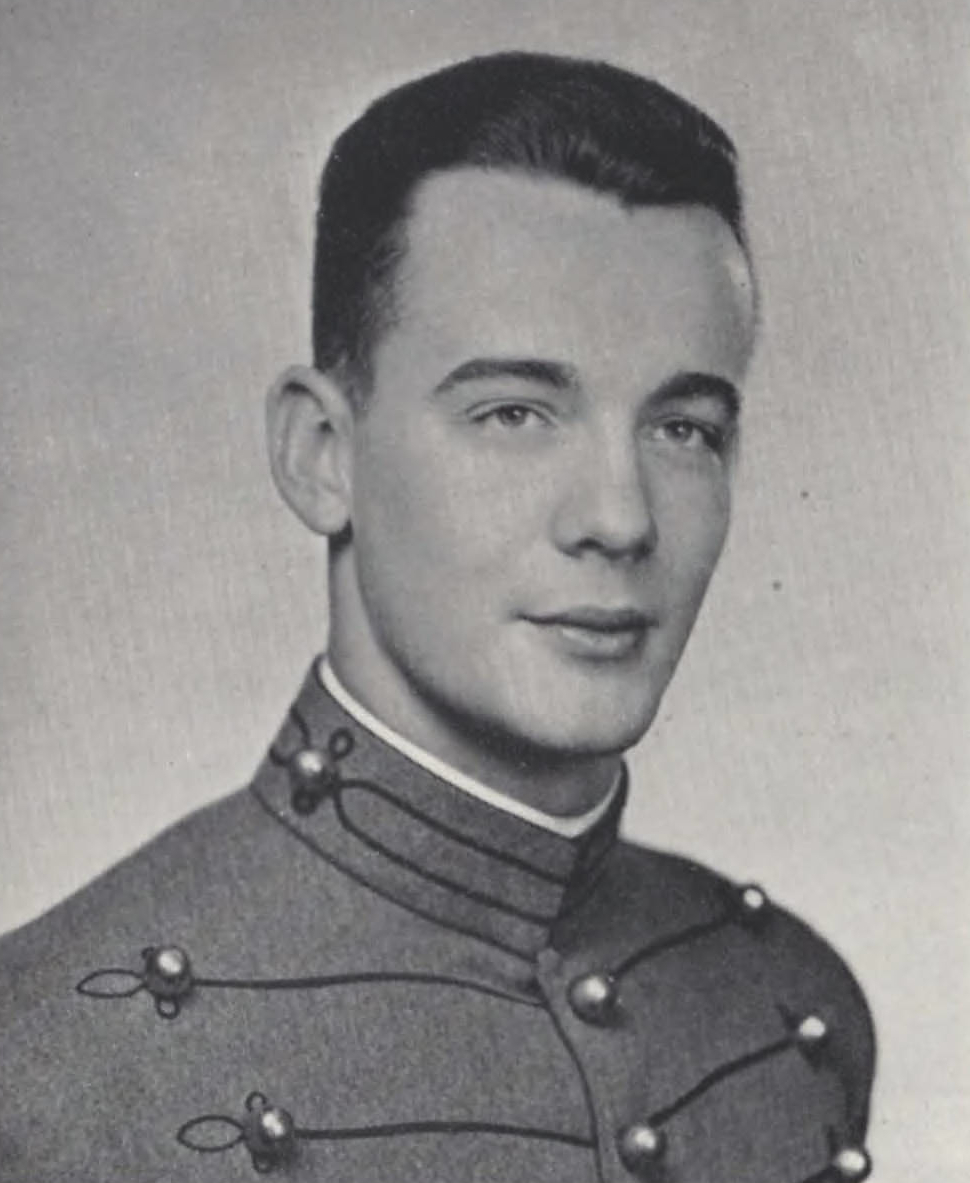
Forrest as a United States Military Academy cadet c. 1949

Forrest was born in Mexia, Texas, on June 20, 1927, the second son of Robert E. and Gertrude Klug Forrest. One of his ancestors was Confederate general Nathan Bedford Forrest. His father was severely injured as a United States Army Air Service pilot in World War I, and his brother Robert fought in the Battle of the Bulge in World War II and survived capture by the Germans.

Forrest left Mexia when he was a young boy. The oil business led his father to move the family to Houston, Texas; Saginaw, Michigan; and Olney, Illinois. At Olney High School, he was a scholar and an athlete, joining the National Honor Society and playing varsity basketball and football. A swimmer, he worked summers as a lifeguard. Forrest was president of his senior class and the debate club, and voted "most popular."

== Military career ==
=== Early career and Korea ===
Forrest entered the United States Military Academy in 1945 during the closing days of World War II. As a West Point cadet, he played B-Squad football and fought on the A-1 boxing team. His roommates were Samuel S. Coursen, Joe Toomey, Murray Williams, Collier Ross, and Jim Scholtz. In his Third Class year, at the "Hop" dance party, Forrest met Patricia Smith of Long Beach, New York, whom he married in July 1949 after graduation. Forrest proceeded to Fort Riley, Kansas and Fort Benning, Georgia, where he attended the Infantry Basic Course before being sent to the Korean War.

Forrest led a platoon of the 2nd Battalion, 5th Cavalry Regiment, 1st Cavalry Division through the darkest days in Korea. After fighting in the Battle of the Pusan Perimeter, his command was the first to enter North Korea and the North Korean capital Pyongyang. He earned the Combat Infantryman Badge, two Purple Hearts, and two Silver Stars. Two of his West Point roommates, Lieutenant Samuel S. Coursen, a fellow 5th Cavalry Regiment company commander and Medal of Honor recipient, and Lieutenant Joe Toomey, were killed in action in Korea.

From Forrest's Silver Star citations: "Courageously gathering his six remaining men, he briefed them on his plan of surprise action to rout the enemy group. He led them yelling and shouting into the enemy's midst. This ruse completely baffled and surprised the enemy into believing their main position had fallen." Although wounded in the leg during the early part of the action, Lieutenant Forrest refused to be evacuated and moved from position to position, in the face of heavy enemy fire, to encourage and reorganize his men. He directed a defense of his position and led a successful counterattack.

=== Rise to senior command ===
Upon his return from Korea, Forrest was posted to Fort Jackson, South Carolina in 1951 as a company commander with the 8th Infantry Division and the 28th Infantry Division in Germany, Fort Leavenworth, Kansas and the University of Wisconsin–Madison, where he earned a master's degree in journalism. He completed the Infantry Advanced Course, Ranger, Airborne and other schools, was assigned to the Pentagon, and graduated from the United States Army War College.

In 1967 Forrest took command of the 3rd Battalion, 187th Infantry Regiment of the 101st Airborne Division at Fort Campbell, Kentucky. His unit was mobilized to maintain order during the August 1967 riots in Detroit, Michigan. He later took the battalion to Vietnam, where in two tours of duty he earned a second Combat Infantryman Badge; and awarded a third Silver Star, the Legion of Merit, four Bronze Star Medals for Valor, and four Air Medals for Valor. After the Tet Offensive of 1968, General William Westmoreland awarded Forrest's unit the Valorous Unit Award and Meritorious Unit Citation.

After his Vietnam tours of duty in 1971, Forrest was assigned to the 2nd Armored Division, Fort Hood, Texas as commander of 1st Brigade and Support Command, then chief of staff. From 1976 to 1978 he was commanding general of the 4th Infantry Division at Fort Carson, Colorado. In 1979 he took command of First United States Army at Fort Meade, Maryland and led the military's response and logistical support during the 1980 Cuban refugee crisis. His final assignment in July 1981 was as Deputy Commander-in-Chief, United States Army Europe at Heidelberg, Germany, where he retired after 33 years of active duty on August 11, 1983.

== Post-army career and retirement ==
In retirement, Forrest moved to Colorado Springs, Colorado, and plunged into civic affairs, winning election to the city council. As the first executive director of the United States Space Foundation, Forrest was a proponent of the Star Wars space defense initiative of the Reagan Administration.

He died May 27, 1997, at age 69, following a series of strokes. In 1998, the Forrest Fitness Center at Fort Carson was dedicated and named in his honor. Forrest was buried at Evergreen Cemetery in Colorado Springs.

== Awards and decorations ==
Combat Infantryman Badge (two awards)
Ranger tab
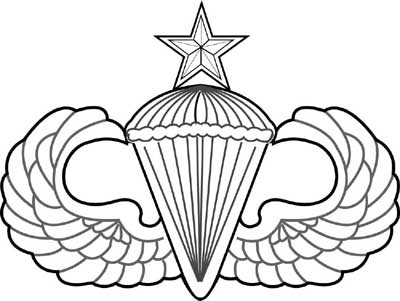
Senior Parachutist Badge
Army Staff Identification Badge

Army Distinguished Service Medal
Silver Star with two bronze oak leaf clusters
Legion of Merit with oak leaf cluster
Bronze Star Medal with "V" device and three oak leaf clusters
Air Medal with V device and bronze award numeral 4
Army Commendation Medal with oak leaf cluster
Purple Heart with oak leaf cluster
Valorous Unit Award
Meritorious Unit Commendation
World War II Victory Medal
Army of Occupation Medal
National Defense Service Medal with oak leaf cluster
Korean Service Medal with one bronze service star
Vietnam Service Medal with service star
Republic of Korea Presidential Unit Citation
United Nations Korea Medal
Vietnam Campaign Medal
