= Pescatore (disambiguation) =

Pescatore is a surname meaning fisherman.

Pescatore may also refer to:

- Dal Pescatore, a restaurant in Canneto sull'Oglio, Italy
- "Il pescatore", a 1970 song by Fabrizio De André
- Palazzo Pescatore, a palace in St. Paul's Bay, Malta

== See also ==
- Pescadore (disambiguation)
- Pescatoria, a genus of flowering plants from the orchid family Orchidaceae
- Pescatorio or Ring of the Fisherman, part of the regalia worn by the Pope
