= Ta' Għemmuna Battery =

- Batterija ta' Għemmuna
- Part of the French blockade batteries
- St. Julian's, Malta

Site information
- Type: Artillery battery

Location
- Coordinates: 35°55′34.98″N 14°29′41.1″E

Site history
- Built: 1799
- Built by: Maltese insurgents
- In use: 1799–1800
- Materials: Limestone
- Fate: Demolished
- Battles/wars: Siege of Malta (1798–1800)

Ta' Għemmuna Battery (Maltese: Batterija ta' Għemmuna) was an artillery battery in St. Julian's, Malta, that was built by Maltese insurgents during the French blockade of 1798–1800. The battery was located at Dragonara Point, in front of the Hospitaller entrenchments at Spinola. The battery had a large parapet with nine embrasures and a magazine. It was armed with seven guns, which had been taken from St. Mary's Tower and St. Paul's Bay.

The battery was built by Vincenzo Borg in February 1799, after a French force of around 30 ships was sighted close to the Maltese coast. The battery was built to prevent a French relief force from landing at St. Julian's Bay and St. George's Bay, therefore protecting other insurgent positions from the rear. The battery had a hexagonal parapet design which was designed by Francesco Sammut on payment by Borg. A rough sketch of the battery by Sammut still exists and was retrieved by the architect Andre Zammit.

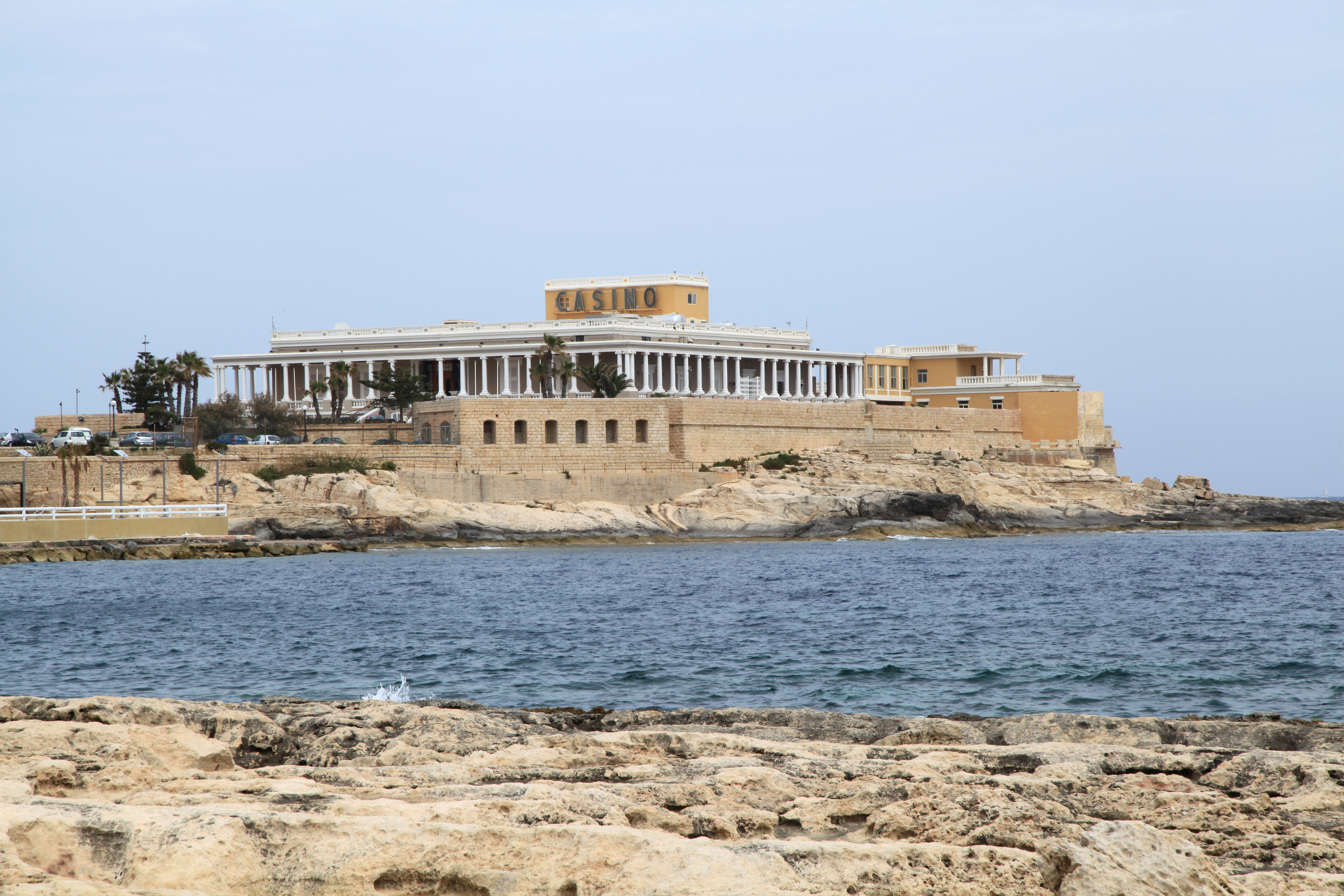
The Dragonara Palace, which was built on the site of the battery

The battery still existed in 1811, but it was eventually demolished. Its site is now occupied by the Dragonara Palace, which was built in 1870 and is now a casino.
