= Pescatore =

Pescatore (Italian for "fisher" or "fisherman") is a surname that may refer to:

- Antoine Pescatore (1787–1858), Luxembourgish businessman and politician
- Enrico Pescatore or Henry, Count of Malta (fl. 13th century), Genoese adventurer, privateer and pirate
- Ferdinand Pescatore (1791–1862), member of the Council of State of Luxembourg
- Fred Pescatore, American author, medical commentator and internist
- Jean-Pierre Pescatore (1793–1855), Luxembourgish-French businessman, banker, art collector, and philanthropist
- John Pescatore (born 1964), American rower
- Théodore Pescatore (1802–1878), Luxembourgish politician
- Pierre Pescatore (1919–2010), Luxembourgish judge
- Adeline Pescatore (1926–2018), Italian-American fashionista and at-home comedienne.

== See also ==
- Pescatore (disambiguation)
