= Dragonara Palace =

- Il-Palazz tad-Dragunara (Maltese)
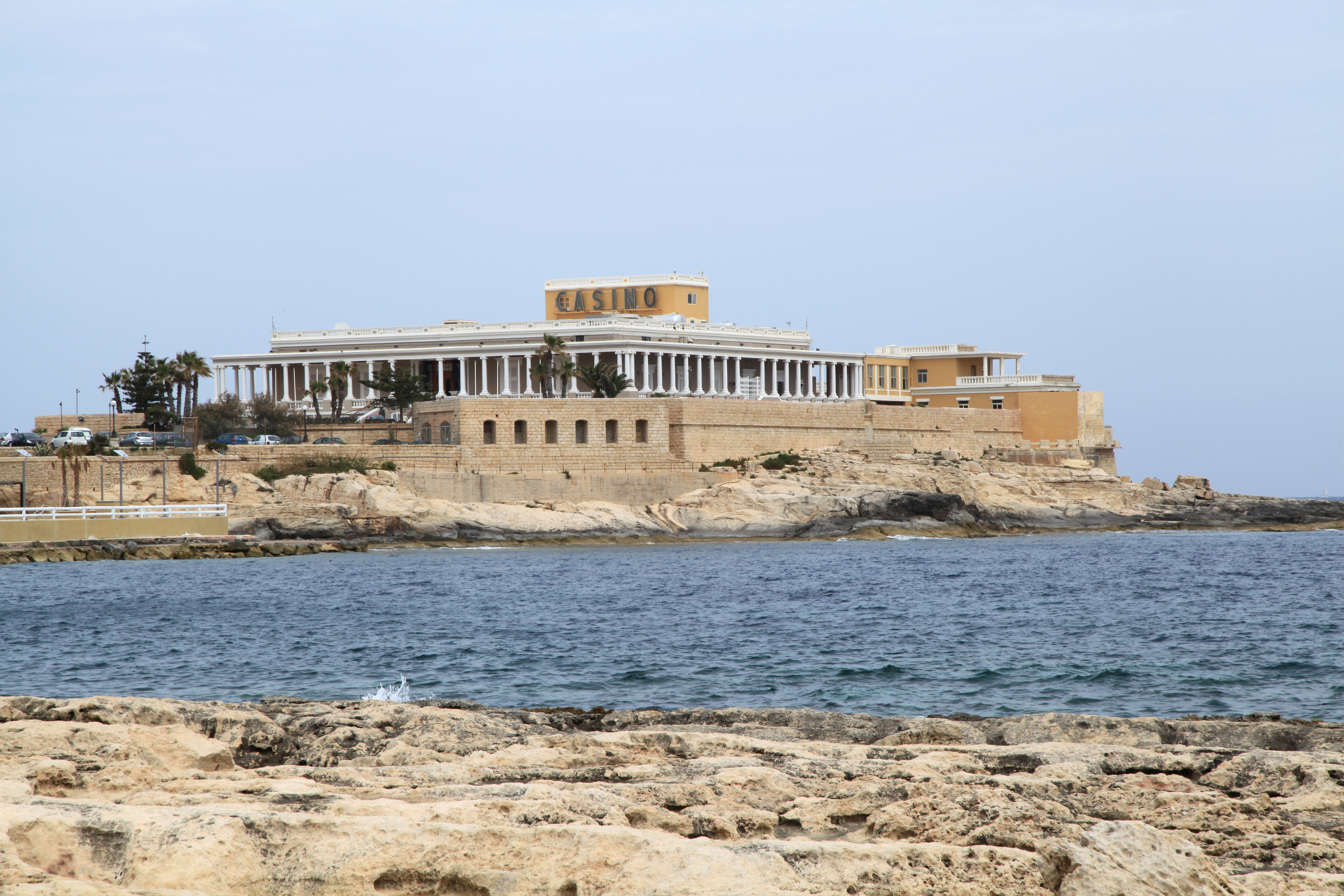
- View of the Dragonara Palace
- Interactive map of the Dragonara Palace area
- Alternative names: Palazzo Dragonara; Villa Dragonara; Dragonara Casino

General information
- Status: Intact
- Type: Palace (now casino)
- Architectural style: Neoclassical
- Location: St. Julian's, Malta
- Coordinates: 35°55′35″N 14°29′40.9″E
- Named for: Dragonara Point
- Completed: 1870 by Damiano Alberti

Technical details
- Material: Limestone

Website
- www.dragonaracasino.com

Dragonara Palace (Maltese: Il-Palazz tad-Dragunara), also known as Palazzo Dragonara or Villa Dragonara, is a palace in St. Julian's, Malta. It was built in 1870 as a summer residence for the Scicluna family, and it is now a casino called Dragonara Casino.

== Etymology ==
The palace is named after Dragonara Point, the peninsula on which it was built. According to local legend, a dragon lived in caves near the peninsula whose roars reached the shore. The roaring was probably the sound of the waves breaking the rocks or the howling of the wind. It is believed that the rumours of the dragon were spread by smugglers to discourage people from going to the area.

== History ==
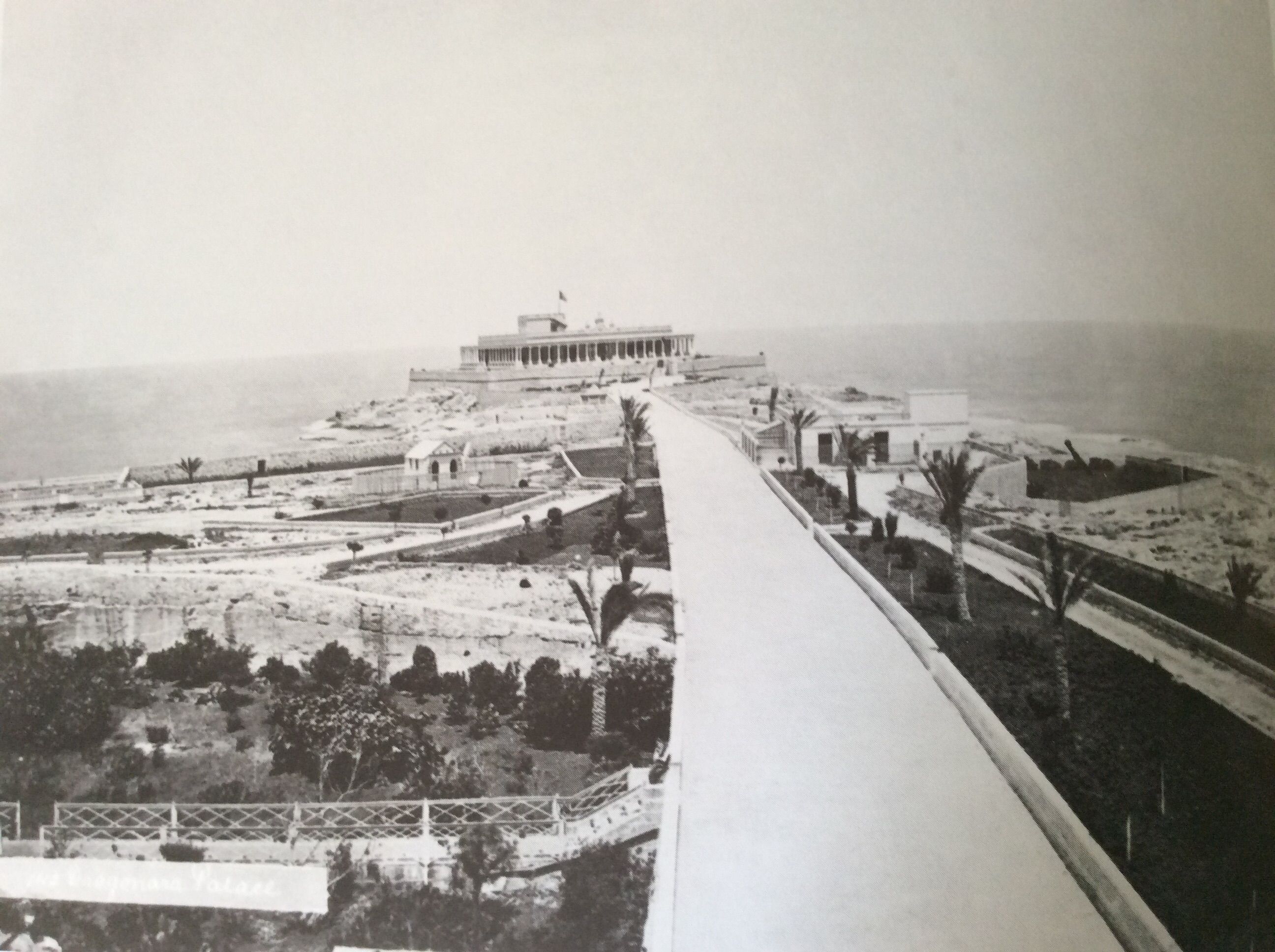
View of Dragonara Palace and its gardens in the late 19th-century

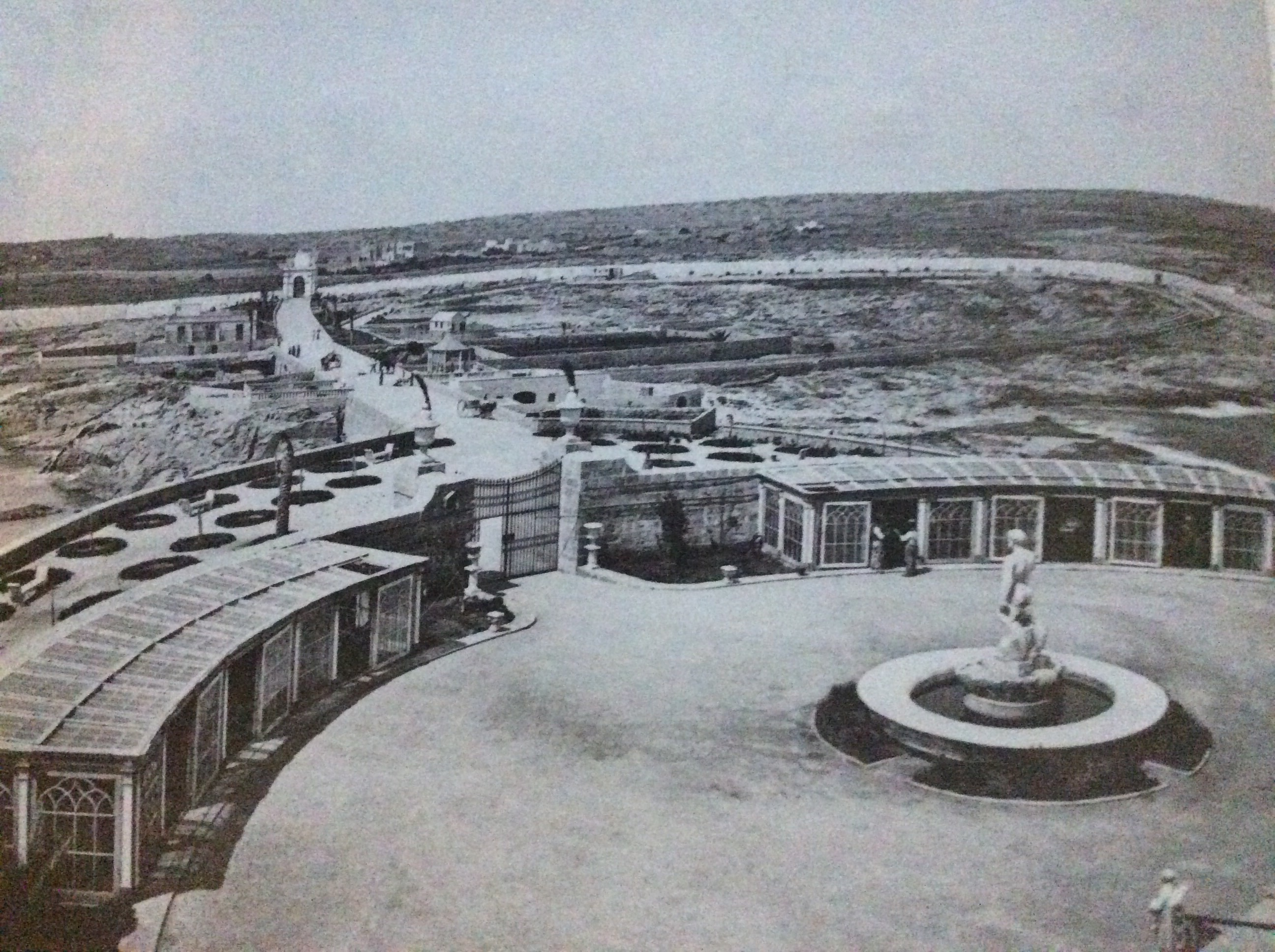
The palace overlooking the area that is now Paceville in 1870

The Dragonara Palace was built in 1870 on Dragonara Point, which had been previously occupied by Ta' Għemmuna Battery. The peninsula where it is built was originally known as Għemmuna Point.

The palace served as the summer residence of Emmanuele Scicluna, a banker who became a marquis in 1875.

During World War I, it was temporarily used as an officers' hospital. Later on, the Scicluna family hosted over 100 refugees in the palace during World War II.

The palace opened as a casino on 15 July 1964, at a time when nearby Paceville began its transition from a mainly agricultural area to a tourist hub. The Dragonara Casino was the first casino in Malta, and this was a major step in establishing Malta as a tourist destination. In the 1990s, The Westin Dragonara hotel was built on part of the palace's gardens.

The casino was privatized in 1999, and the company Dragonara Casino Ltd was set up to run the business for 10 years. The palace was restored in 2008. Two years later, the casino was taken over by Dragonara Gaming Ltd, who have spent over €15 million in renovating the building. It receives about 350,000 patrons annually, making it the most popular casino in Malta.

The palace is listed on the National Inventory of the Cultural Property of the Maltese Islands.

== Architecture ==
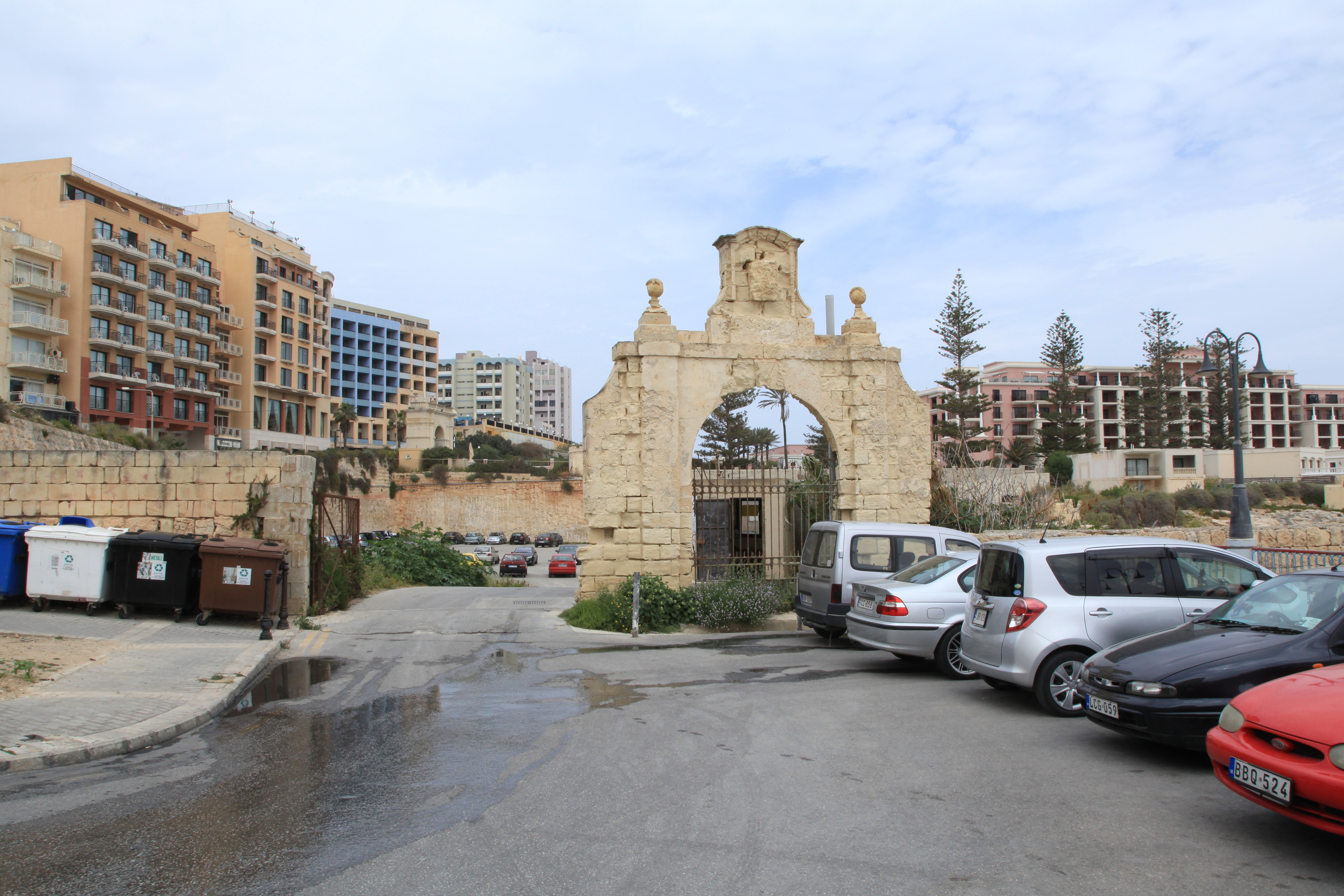
One of the arches to the palace, now leads to a car park, with the main arch seen far to the left

Dragonara Palace is built in neoclassical architecture, and its colonnades are inspired by those of Villa Portelli and Palazzo Capua. The design of the Dragonara Palace later inspired the colonnades of Palazzo Pescatore, which was built in St. Paul's Bay in the late 19th century.

The palace's architect is not known, but it is sometimes attributed to Giuseppe Bonavia.

=== Palace ===
The palace originally consisted of a colonnaded villa with a central courtyard. The Scicluna family leased the property in 1964 to the Kursaal Company Limited when the courtyard was roofed becoming the casino's gaming rooms and the Slots Palace was built at the back, which were designed by Dom Mintoff, an architect who eventually became Prime Minister of Malta. At this stage the Sheraton Hotel was built on the ground of the palace's gardens that was eventually replaced by The Westin Dragonara.

=== Gardens ===
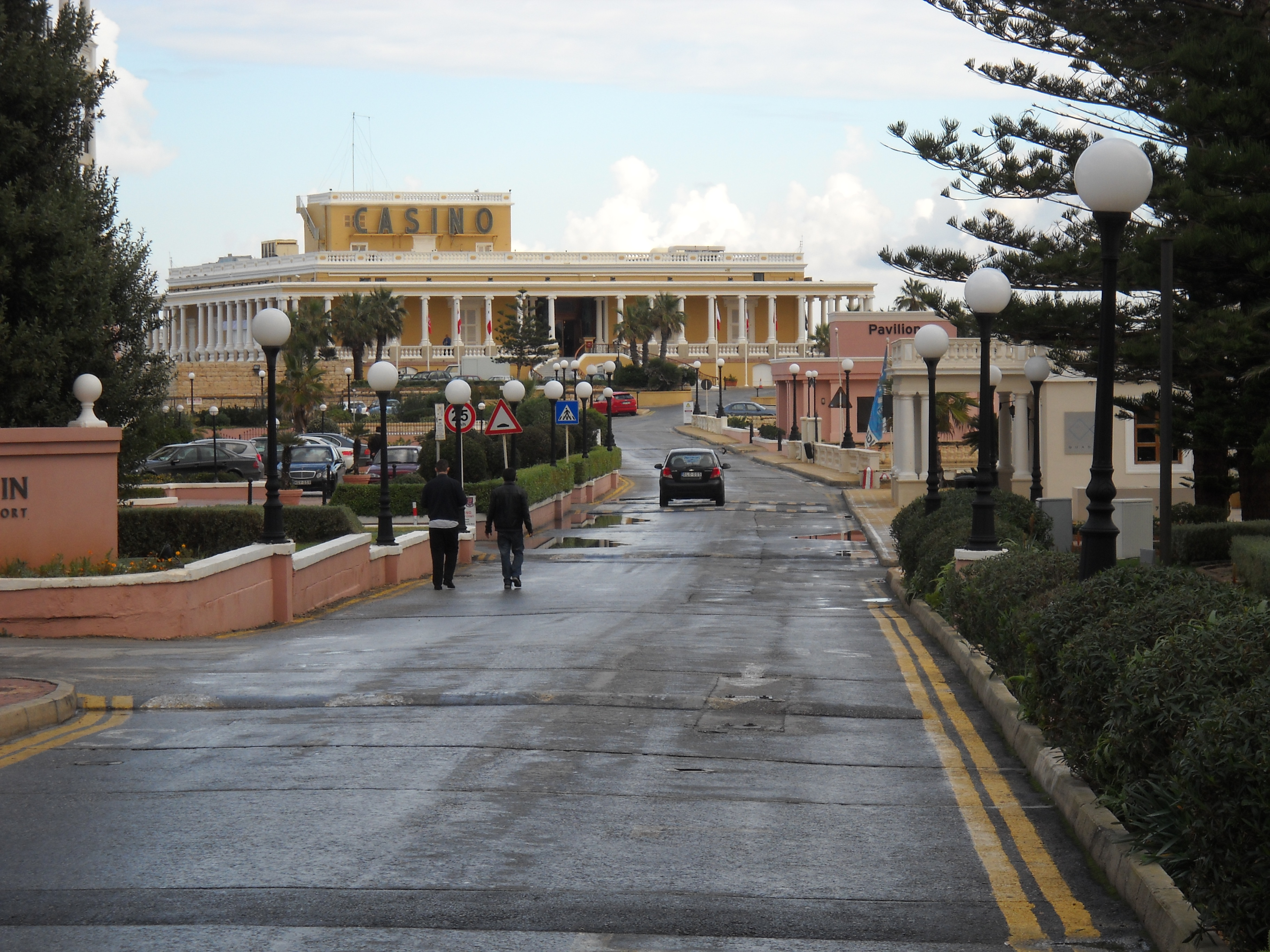
The remaining gardens at Dragonara Palace

When the palace was originally built, it was surrounded by extensive gardens. Part of these were destroyed to make way for The Westin Dragonara hotel and the casino's parking lot. The palace's Sunken Garden, which contains a number of fountains and olive trees, is now located within the grounds of The Westin Dragonara.

== Art ==
=== Main entrance ===
The main entrance into the palace's gardens consists of an arch with the inscription Deus Nobis Haec Otia Fecit, meaning "God made these leisures for us". It is designated as a Grade 1 property by the Malta Environment and Planning Authority.

=== Statue of Neptune ===
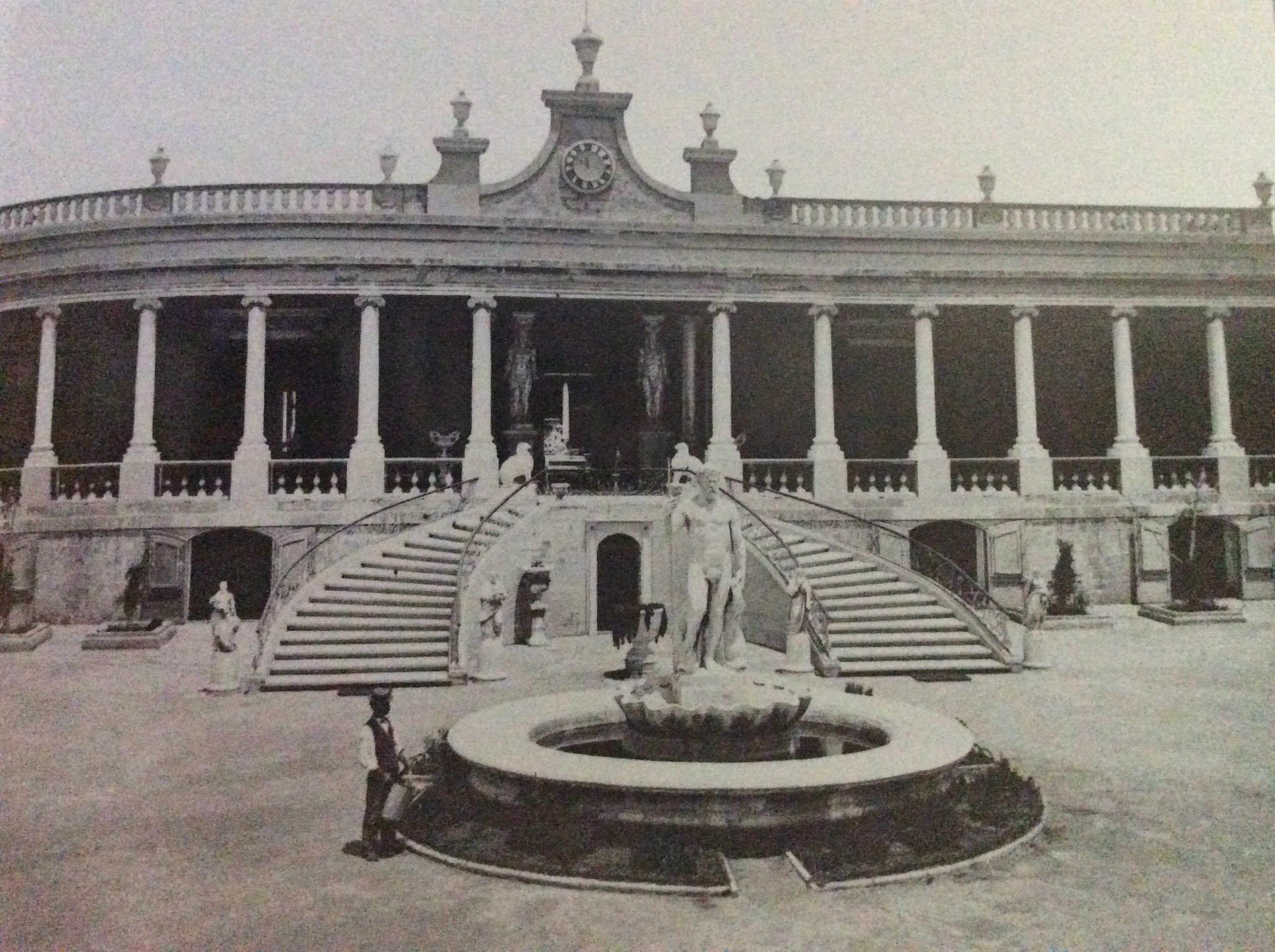
Old photo of the Dragonara Palace, showing the statue of Neptune in its original location

A fountain containing a statue of Neptune was located at the entrance of the palace, just after the path leading from the gardens. The statue was built in the 19th century, but it is inspired by an earlier statue of Neptune which is now found in the courtyard of the Grandmaster's Palace in Valletta. The fountain and statue are now located inside the palace for their preservation.

=== Statue of Marquis Scicluna ===
Since the statue of Neptune was relocated to the palace, a life-sized statue of Marquis Emmanuele Scicluna has been located in its place. The statue was designed by the Italian sculptor Giulio Moschetti, and it was restored in 2014.

=== Egyptian caryatids ===
Two Egyptian-style caryatids are located near the palace's doorway, supporting the building.

=== Frescoes ===
Some rooms of the palace contain frescoes painted by Vincenzo Maria Cremona. The fresco in the Yellow Room shows military and floral paraphernalia, as well as a bird holding a garland of roses. The ceiling panels of the Green Room has frescoes showing a personification of industry.

== Sources ==
- Agius, Frederica (2014). The Dragonara Palace. A Historic Perspective. Dragonara Gaming Limited. ISBN 9789995707187.
