= Polidano Group =

Maltese construction business

- Industry: construction, real estate, hospitality
- Founded: July 14, 1987; 38 years ago
- Founder: Charles Polidano (Iċ-Ċaqnu)
- Headquarters: Ħal Farruġ, Luqa, Malta
- Website: www.polidano-group.com

The Polidano Group is the largest private construction business in Malta.

== History ==
Charles Polidano (Iċ-Ċaqnu, born 1960) and his brother Paul founded in 1982 a small construction company, which was incorporated as Polidano Brothers Ltd in July 1987. The company invested in the mechanisation of the construction industry (until then very labour-intensive), growing through three decades into Malta's biggest construction company.

The Polidano groups has operations in various sectors: manufacturing and construction, the group's core activity; property development; and hospitality and leisure (The Westin Dragonara, Le Meridien, St Julian's, and Montekristo Estates).

Polidano has been working on almost all major infrastructural projects in Malta in the past decades from the Malta Freeport terminal 1 extension, the Lufthansa Technik hangar, the WasteServ Sant Antnin Solid Waste Treatment Plant, the North Sewage Treatment Plant, as well The Westin Dragonara, Intercontinental Hotel and Hilton hotels and the high-end housing developments of Portomaso and Tigné Point.

== Legal issues ==
In 2009 Polidano started the development of a 40-apartment residential block within Balzan's village core, despite its application having been rejected by the Malta Environment and Planning Authority (MEPA) as leading to overdevelopment. Polidano, who had already cleared the back garden by uprooting trees (including 50 years old protected bay laurel trees), then left the area in a dilapidated state for years. In July 2011, MEPA issued an emergency conservation order over the site, but Polidano took no action. In July 2013 a Court fined Polidano Group for €100,000, close to the maximum by law, and ordered Polidano to abide by the conservation order. However, in November 2017 the court of criminal appeal reduced the fine to €10,000, noting that in the meantime, in 2014, another Polidano company had been granted permission to develop the area while preserving a green enclave with a large number of trees. Polidano was still ordered to comply with the emergency conservation order or pay a daily fine of €130. Also, in February 2017 the Planning Authorities sanctioned further changes to the project, including the building of a swimming pool.

The development of Polidano's headquarters in Ħal Farruġ, 64,000 square metres of land on the limits of the Malta Airport, took place without any permit. Polidano built a 19-metre high office block (double the 10.5 metre limit for industrial areas) and multilevel underground parking, as well as a brick factory and a dormitory for up to 64 foreign workers. In July 2010 Polidano applied for legalisation. These developments were subject to an enforcement notice by the Planning Authority in 2011, which was however suspended for over a decade pending applications for sanctioning. In May 2021 the Planning Authority legalised Polidano's illegal developments against a fine of €32,754.

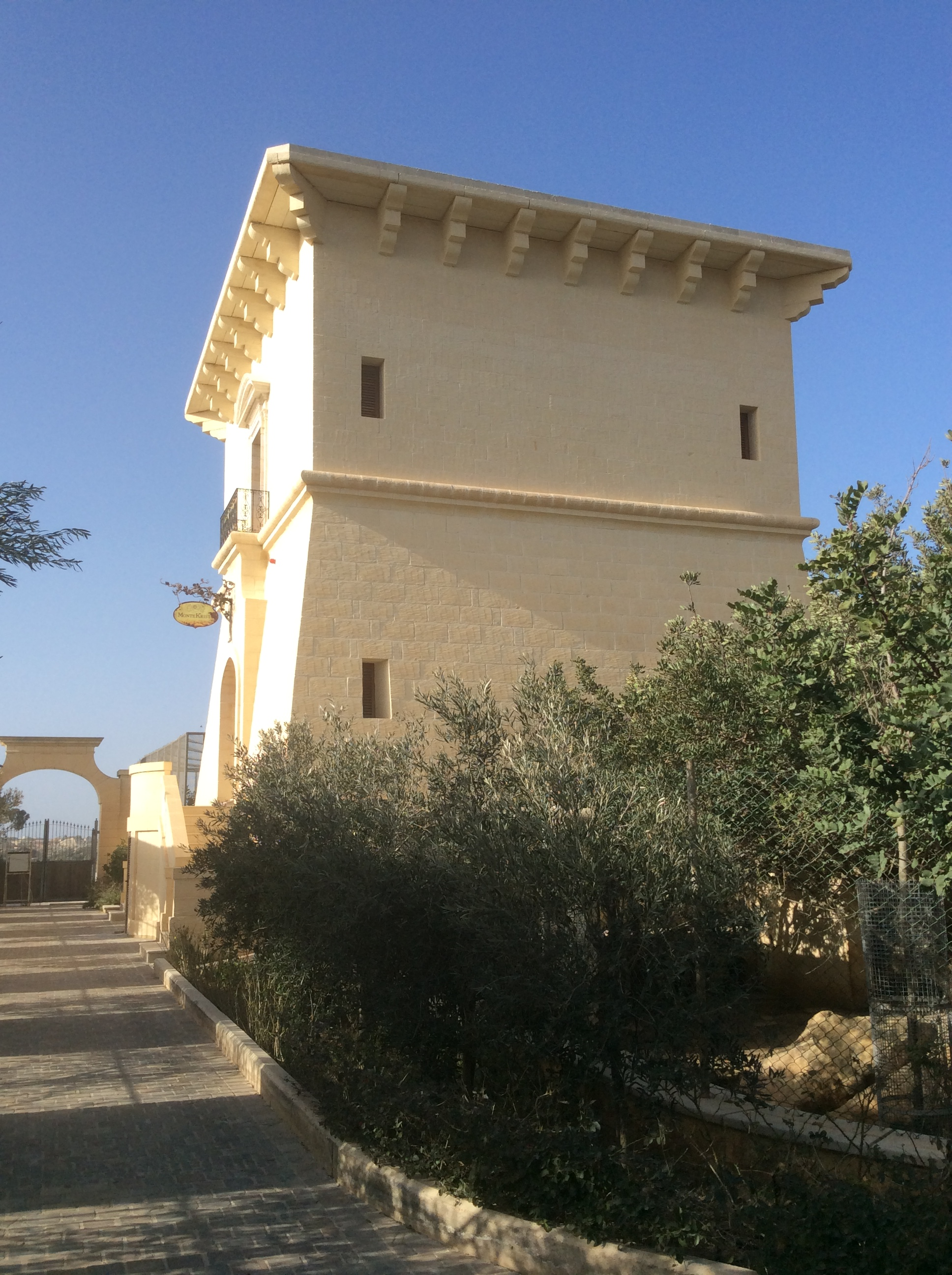
Polidano's Torri Falkun at the Montekristo Estates in Siġġiewi

Polidano also owns the Montekristo Estates holding outside Siġġiewi, including event venues, entertainment facilities, a zoo, a restaurant, a winery, and an olive oil mill operation, which Malta's Planning Authority once described as “one of the largest illegally-built construction sites on the island”. In November 2013 the Planning Authority descended on the site together with soldiers and police to demolish illegalities, including a replica of a Knights of Malta tower, a classical-style building and a four-storey edifice with a pool being used as a cafeteria. However, any demolition was prevented by a court injunction elicited by Polidano. In June 2020 the Planning Authority stopped illegal works at the site (two towers on either side of the main gate), after Polidano had gathered over €700,000 in daily fines.

In November 2020 Times of Malta reported that Polidano Brothers Limited had gathered some €30.4 million in unpaid taxes over two decades. Other companies owned by Charles Polidano (including the Montekristo Estates) also owned the Maltese state some €6.3 million and €1.2 million. Polidano had been ordered to settle the outstanding debt or face legal action. It is unclear how Polidano could apply for public tenders (which require a compliance certificate) given the outstanding unpaid taxes.

Following the news of unpaid tax arrears, Polidano Group was reportedly blacklisted from public tenders. However, Charles Polidano continued to bid for public works through other controlled companies, and to conduct works in partnership with other major developers such as Joseph Portelli.

In July 2022, Charles Polidano and his son Gordon were arrested on suspicion of having corrupted a senior official at a large entity through the sale of a property. They were released on bail.
