= The Westin Dragonara =

Westin Dragonara Hotel
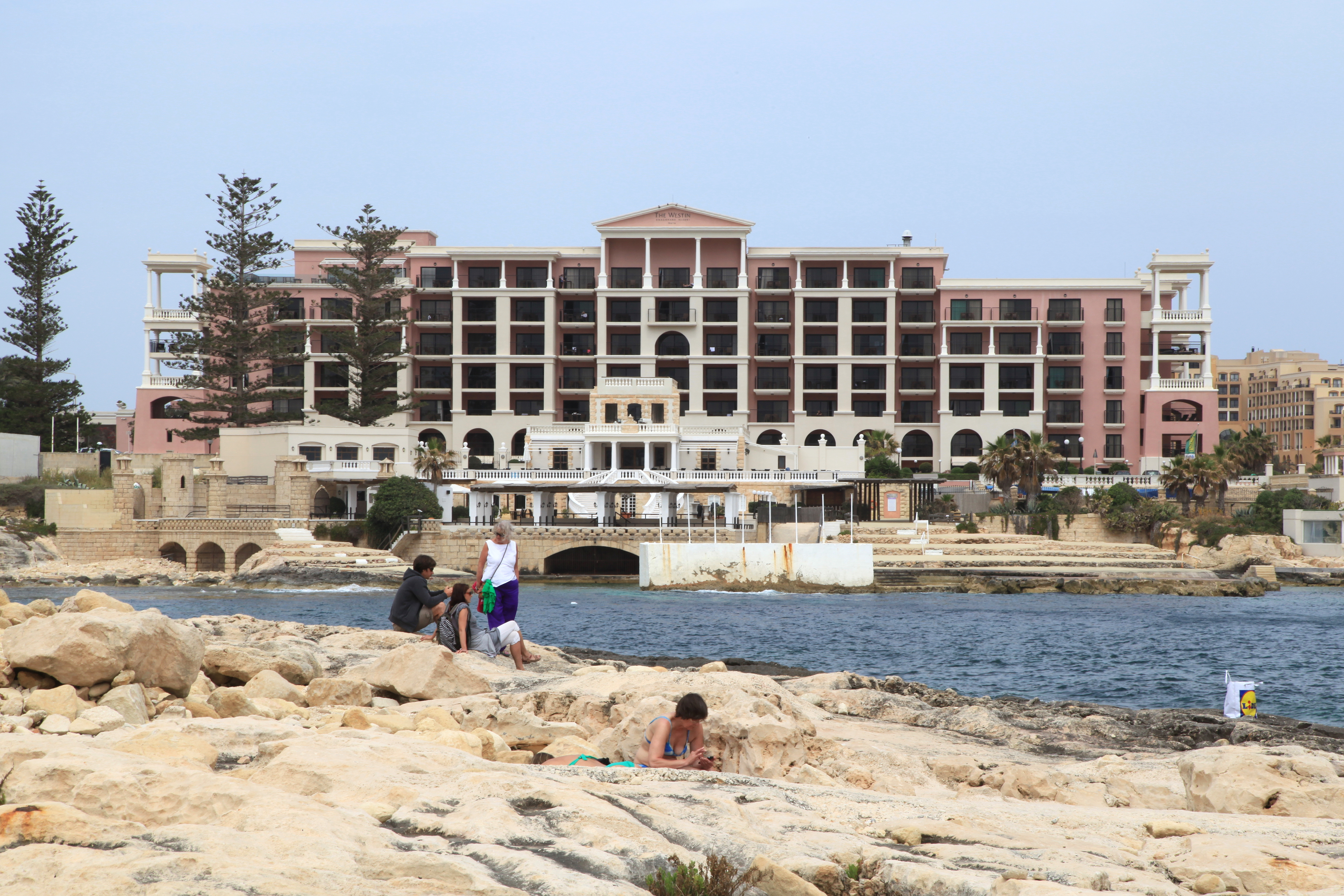
- Westin Dragonara in Malta

- Location within Malta
- Hotel chain: Westin

General information
- Location: Dragonara Road St. Julians STJ 02; Malta
- Coordinates: 35.925107°N 14.493148°E
- Opening: 1997 (renovated in 2020)
- Owner: Polidano Group

Technical details
- Floor count: 8

Other information
- Number of rooms: 413

The Westin Dragonara Hotel is a hotel in Paceville, St. Julian's, Malta. It is located near the Dragonara Palace, both being at Dragonara Point. The hotel is situated 5 minutes away from the island's major highway which connects all major sites in Malta. It is owned by Polidano Group.

== History ==
The Westin Dragonara opened in April 1997 with 311 guest rooms, including 30 suites with balconies overlooking the Mediterranean. It had three restaurants, two poolside snack bars and a cocktail lounge, while its amenities included an indoor and two outdoor pools and two tennis courts. The hotel was adjacent to the island's only casino.

After renovating its Luxury Bay Suites in 2018, the hotel announced in July 2020 it has completed a €40 million makeover and the prime minister toured the hotel after the renovation. The conception of the renovated suites and guest rooms was made by London-based interior designer Lynne Hunt.
