= Palazzo Pescatore =

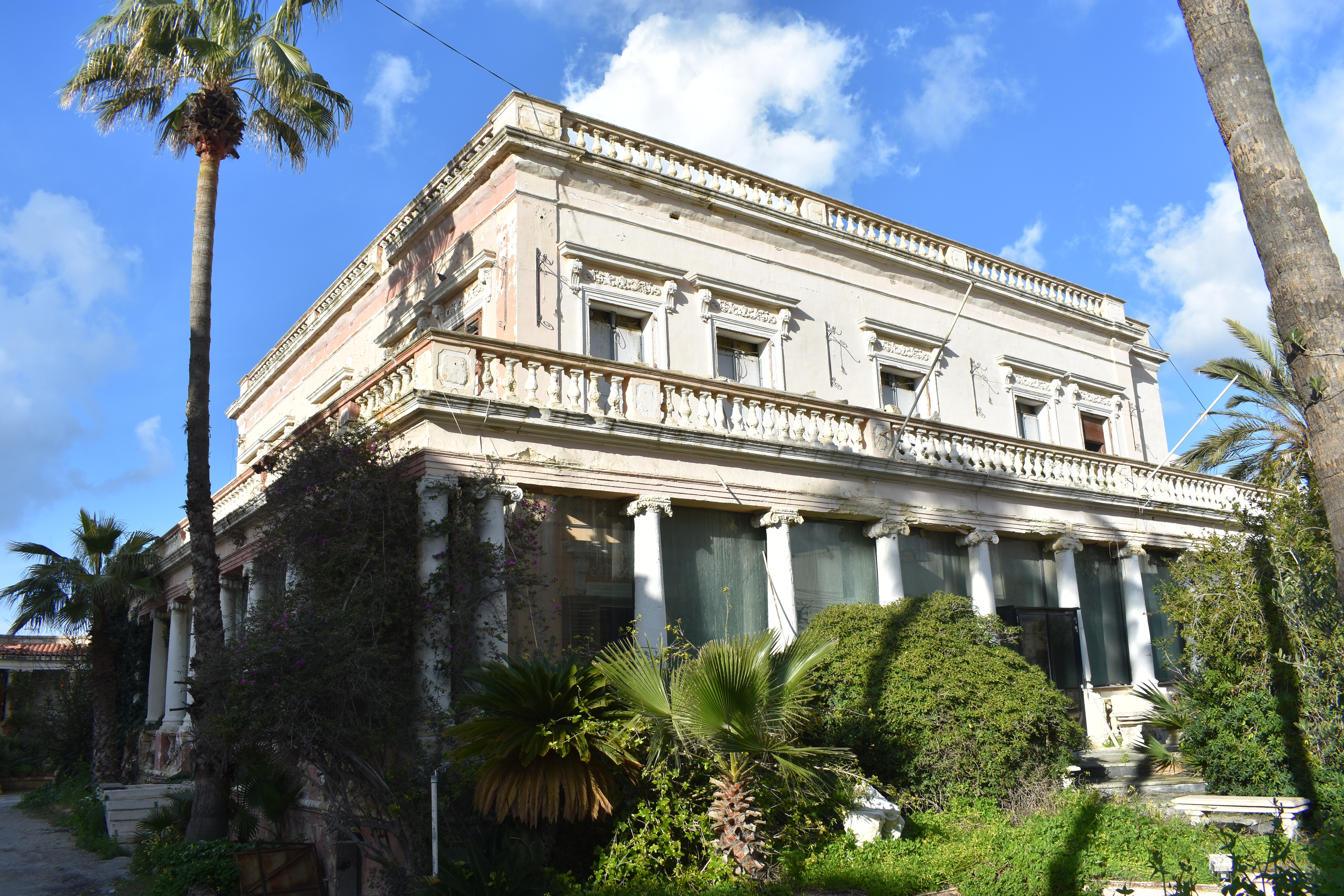
Palazzo Pescatore

Palazzo Pescatore is a palace in St. Paul's Bay, Malta. It was built in the late 19th century. Its symmetrical porticoed façades of neo-classical inspiration are similar to those of Palazzo Dragonara in St. Julian's.

== Architecture ==
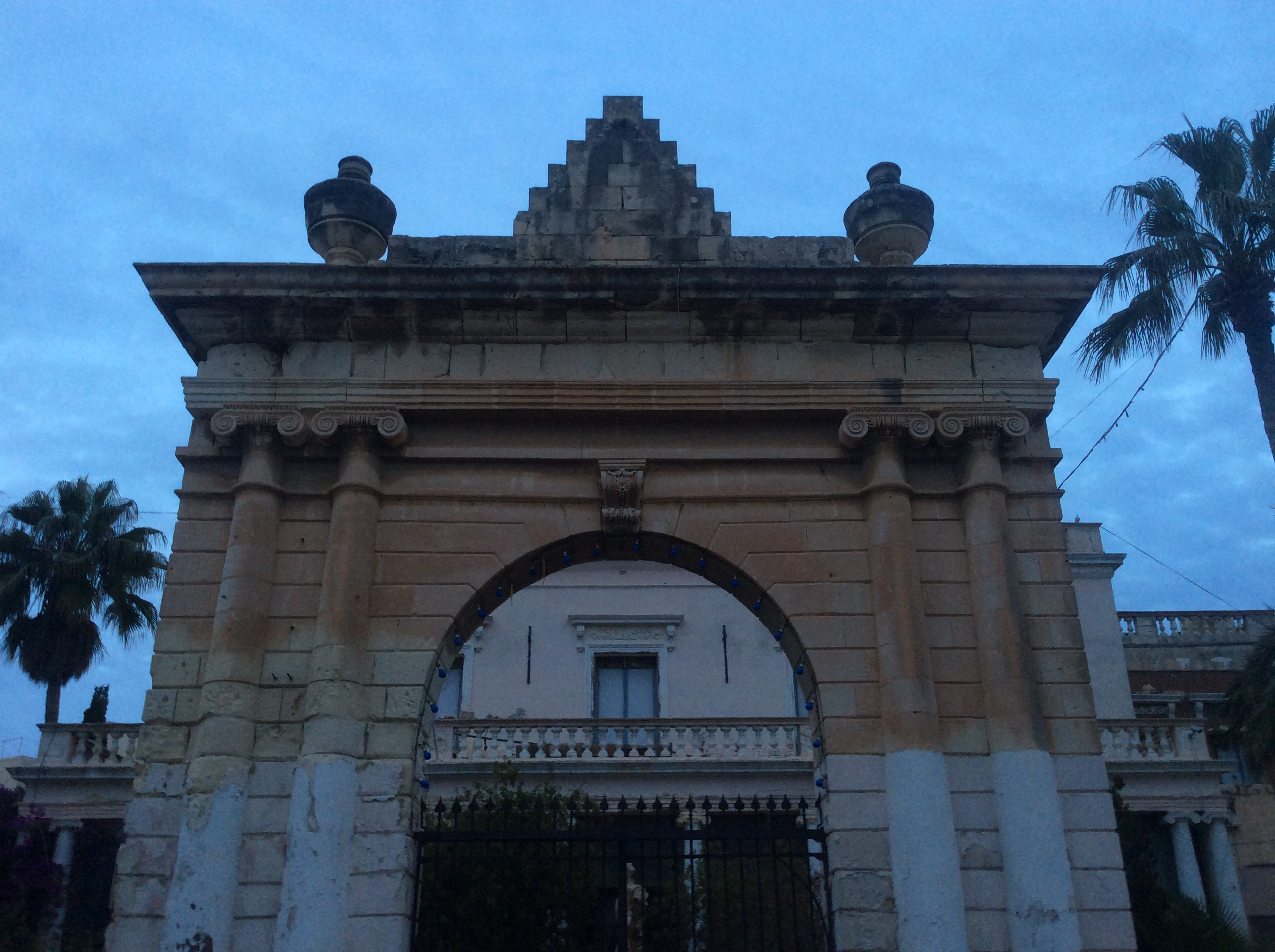
Palazzo Pescatore Arch is a landmark building

The building is two stories tall. Some of the decorations are recent additions. The interior of Palazzo Pescatore was greatly altered during its use as a nightclub.

== Garden ==
The gardens of Palazzo Pescatore have now been re-developed for modern investment.

== Investment ==
=== Nightclub ===
Palazzo Pescatore was used as a nightclub for some time. However, Palazzo Pescatore was banned from operating a nightclub on the site by ruling of the court, in Malta, for several reasons.

=== Restaurant ===
The Palace today serves as a complex, such as having a chained Italian food restaurant, in Malta. The restaurant serves a speciality of fish and the reason after this is because of the name of the palace 'Pescatore' which in translation from Italian to English is 'Fisherman'.

== Maltese heritage ==
The Malta Environment and Planning Authority (MEPA) scheduled Palazzo Pescatore and its grounds as a Grade 2 List of Buildings of Special Architectural or Historic Interest as per Government Notice number 492/06 in the Government Gazette dated June 6, 2006. Palazzo Pescatore is considered as a national monument in need of restoration, while it has suffered from major alterations over time. Thus the palace needs attention and preservation. Palazzo Pescatore is a private property but as a national treasure, the Maltese government holds the right to guide its use, and may negotiate with the owner.

The palace is also listed on the National Inventory of the Cultural Property of the Maltese Islands (NICPMI).
