= Antony Moynihan, 3rd Baron Moynihan =

Member House of Lords (1936–1991)

The Right Honourable The Lord Moynihan
- Baron Moynihan
- Tenure: 1965–1991
- Predecessor: Patrick Moynihan
- Successor: Colin Moynihan
- Other titles: Baronet of Carr Manor
- Born: Antony Patrick Andrew Cairne Berkeley Moynihan; 2 February 1936
- Died: 24 November 1991 (aged 55); Manila, Philippines
- Spouses: Ann Herbert (m. 1955; div. 1958) Shirin Berry (m. 1958; div. 1967) Luthgarda Fernandez (m. 1968; div. 1979) Editha Eduarda Ruben (m. 1981): Jinna Sabiaga (m. 1990; void)
- Parents: Patrick Moynihan; Irene Helen Candy

Member of the House of Lords Lord Temporal
- In office 30 April 1965 – 24 November 1991; Hereditary Peerage
- Preceded by: Patrick Moynihan
- Succeeded by: Colin Moynihan (1997)

Antony Patrick Andrew Cairne Berkeley Moynihan, 3rd Baron Moynihan, 3rd Baronet of Carr Manor (2 February 1936 – 24 November 1991) was a British hereditary peer. He lived a playboy lifestyle and married five times. After multiple charges of fraud in 1970, he left the UK for good. Settling in the Philippines, he was allegedly involved in procuring and drug trafficking.

== Biography ==
Moynihan was born on 2 February 1936 to Patrick Moynihan and his wife Irene Helen Candy. Patrick Moynihan later that year became the 2nd Baron Moynihan. Patrick's father Berkeley Moynihan had been made a peer for his services to medicine in 1929. His mother was the daughter of Cairnes Candy, an Englishman who had immigrated to Western Australia. After attending Stowe School, Moynihan served in the Coldstream Guards.

In 1955 Moynihan married Ann Herbert, an actress and model. After a domestic dispute and an affair on Moynihan's part, he left for Australia where he intended working on his uncle's sheep farm. In Sydney he met Shirin Berry, a Malaysian who danced under the name Princess Amina. Returning to England in 1957 he reconciled with Ann, however this was short-lived. He married Shirin in 1958 after converting to Islam. He was soon on the move again, leaving for Ibiza with his wife. After the collapse of his nightclub business he returned to England.

In Tokyo in 1960 he challenged Al Ricketts, an American journalist, to a duel after he criticised Shirin's dancing. Moynihan defeated Rickets in the unusual duel that involved the two combatants attacking each other with their buttocks. In 1961 he and his wife converted to the Baháʼí Faith. At this time, Moynihan worked as a driver for Peter Rachman. After the death of his father in 1965 he became the 3rd Baron Moynihan, taking a seat in the House of Lords. In the Lords he took the Liberal Whip.

In 1970, after facing a series of fraud charges, he left England for Spain, later moving to the Philippines. In the Philippines, he operated a brothel and was linked to the drug trade, but had some level of protection due to his close ties with President Ferdinand Marcos. In 1980 he was named by the Woodward Royal Commission in Australia as an associate of a prominent Australian drug trafficking group operating between Manila and Sydney.

During the late 1980s Moynihan worked as an informant for the United States Drug Enforcement Administration, for which he was given immunity from prosecution. His testimony led to the conviction of Howard Marks, a Welsh drug smuggler. "He's a first-class bastard", Marks said.

== Marriages and children ==
Moynihan was married four times (his putative fifth marriage was bigamous and thus void ab initio) and had five children.

Firstly, Moynihan married Ann Herbert on 25 May 1955. They were divorced in 1958 and had no children.

Secondly, he married Shirin Roshan Berry Quereshi in 1958. They were divorced in 1967, having had one daughter:

- Hon Miranda Dorne Ierne Moynihan (born 25 February 1959)

Thirdly, he married Luthgarda Maria Beltran del Rosa Fernandez in May 1968. They were divorced in 1980, having had three daughters:

- Hon Antonita Maria Carmen Fernandez Moynihan (born 31 March 1969)
- Hon Aurora Luzon Maria Dolores Moynihan (22 January 1971 – 10 September 2016)
- Hon Kathleen Maynila Helen Imogen Juliet Moynihan (born 9 April 1974)

Fourthly, he married Editha Eduarda in February 1981. In 1990, they went through a divorce declared invalid by the British Courts 31 July 1996. They had no children, although Andrew Antony Joseph Patrick Berkeley Moynihan (born 6 March 1989) was believed to be Moynihan's son until DNA testing proved he was not following a dispute about who would inherit the barony.

Finally, he bigamously married Jinna Mabinta on 2 December 1984. They had one son:

- Daniel Moynihan (born January 1985). He was held by the House of Lords not to be an heir to the barony because of his illegitimacy, due to his parents' bigamous marriage.

In September, 2016, his daughter Aurora was killed in the Philippines. At the time of her death the Philippines was undergoing an intensive and controversial crackdown on drug dealers.

== Death and legacy ==
On the death of the 3rd Baron in 1991 the Barony was declared dormant. In 1997 the House of Lords declared that the 3rd Baron's half-brother Colin was the rightful heir to the barony and baronetcy, finding against two other claimants.

== Ancestry ==
Ancestors of Antony Moynihan, 3rd Baron Moynihan

16. Malachi Moynihan
8. Andrew Moynihan
17. Ann Scott
4. Berkeley Moynihan, 1st Baron Moynihan
18. Thomas Parkin
9. Ellen Ann Parkin
19. Margaret Jones
2. Patrick Moynihan, 2nd Baron Moynihan
20. Thomas Walker Jessop
10. Thomas Richard Jessop
21. Harriet Branham
5. Isabella Wellesley Jessop
22. John Blackburn
11. Isabella Harvey Blackburn
23. Maria Theresa Stansfield
1. Antony Moynihan, 3rd Baron Moynihan
24. Charles Candy
12. Henry Augustus Candy
25. Margaret Papineau
6. Cairnes Derrick Carrington Candy
26. Henry Westenra, 3rd Baron Rossmore
13. Frances Kathleen Westenra
27. Josephine Julia Helen Lloyd
3. Irene Helen Candy
28. John Bourne
14. John Bourne
29. Ethel Mason
7. Gladys Ethel Mary Bourne
30. Charles Wilson Faber
15. Helen Margaretta Faber
31. Mary Beckett Denison

== Arms ==
Coat of arms of Antony Moynihan, 3rd Baron Moynihan
| Crest A demi-knights in armour affrontee resting the sinister hand on the hip Proper and supporting with the dexter hand a spear also Proper flowing therefrom a forked pennon Argent charged with a Maltese Cross Sable. Escutcheon Azure a chevron between in chief three mullets Argent and in base a rose also Argent barbed and seeded Proper. Supporters On either side an owl Argent gorged with a baron's coronet Or. Motto Spiandact Tapeir Neill (Sunshine After Rain) |

Peerage of the United Kingdom
| Preceded by Patrick Moynihan | Baron Moynihan; 1965–1991 | Succeeded by Colin Moynihan |
