= Tim Beaumont =

British politician, priest and life peer (1928–2008)

The Reverend and Right Honourable The Lord Beaumont of Whitley
- Beaumont in 2002

Member of the House of Lords
- Lord Temporal
- Life peerage 6 December 1967 – 8 April 2008

Personal details
- Born: Timothy Wentworth Beaumont; 22 November 1928
- Died: 8 April 2008 (aged 79)
- Party: Liberal (until 1988); Liberal Democrats (1988–99); Green Party of England and Wales (since 1999)
- Spouse: Mary Rose Wauchope (m. 1955)
- Children: 4
- Parent(s): Michael Beaumont; Faith Pease

Timothy Wentworth Beaumont, Baron Beaumont of Whitley (22 November 1928 – 8 April 2008) was a British politician and Anglican priest. He was politically active, successively, in the Liberal Party, the Liberal Democrats and the Green Party of England and Wales. A life peer from 1967, in 1999 he became the first member of either house of the British Parliament to represent the Green Party.

== Early and private life ==
Beaumont's father, Michael Beaumont, was a Conservative MP for Aylesbury, and his paternal grandfather, Hubert Beaumont, was the Liberal MP for Eastbourne from 1906 to 1910 and son of Wentworth Beaumont, 1st Baron Allendale. Beaumont's mother, Faith Pease, died when he was six; his maternal grandfather was the Liberal politician Jack Pease, 1st Baron Gainford.

Beaumont was educated at Eton College and Gordonstoun School. He studied agriculture at Christ Church, Oxford, where he joined the Bullingdon Club and founded the Wagers club, devoted, in the words of one author, to "bringing back the devil-may-care atmosphere of the Regency Bucks". He graduated in 1952 with a fourth-class Bachelor of Arts (BA) degree: as per tradition, his BA was promoted to a Master of Arts (MA Oxon) degree.

He married Mary Rose Wauchope (a cousin of Antony Armstrong-Jones, 1st Earl of Snowdon) in 1955, with whom he had two sons and two daughters.

== Church career ==
After graduating from Oxford, he trained for holy orders at Westcott House, Cambridge, a liberal Anglo-Catholic theological college. He was ordained as a deacon in 1955 and as a priest in 1956. He became an Anglican priest in Kowloon, Hong Kong. He served as assistant chaplain at St John's Cathedral in Hong Kong from 1955 to 1957 and then was vicar of Christ Church, Kowloon Tong, until 1959.

Having received a substantial inheritance in that year, he returned to England to live in Mayfair and then Hampstead. Meanwhile, he was an honorary curate at St Stephen's Church in Rochester Row, Westminster, from 1960 to 1963. He represented the Diocese of London in the Church Assembly from 1960 to 1965. He became involved in church reform, supporting the Parish and People movement. He was owner of the political weekly Time and Tide and then the church reform magazine Prism (later New Christian, which merged with American Christian Century). Considering his views and lifestyle incompatible with his position as a priest, he resigned from active ministry in 1973. In 1984, however, he returned to active ministry and became priest in charge of St Philip and All Saints with St Luke, Kew in the Diocese of Southwark, and then retired to Clapham in 1991.

The Mary Rose School, Kowloon Tong, Hong Kong, a special school for students with severe and complex learning needs, is named after his wife.

== Political career ==
After making a substantial donation to the Liberal Party, he became its joint honorary treasurer in 1962–1963. He was made a Liberal life peer as Baron Beaumont of Whitley, of Child's Hill in Greater London, in 1967. He was chair of the Liberal Party in 1967–1968 and then President in 1969–1970. In Parliament he was Liberal spokesman on education and the arts until 1986. He also served as leader of the Liberals in the Council of Europe. He was co-ordinator of the Green Alliance from 1978 to 1980.

He joined the Liberal Democrats, but, objecting to their support for free trade, he moved to the Green Party in 1999, and became the Green Party spokesman on agriculture. He stood for election to Lambeth Council for the Green Party in Clapham Common ward in 2006.

Beaumont was a Eurosceptic, and argued against proposals for Britain to join the single European currency. For many years he was a vice-president of the cross-party Campaign for an Independent Britain, which campaigned against British membership of the European Union.

In a memorable action, Beaumont put forth in May 1996 a bill to "draw up a plan to prohibit piped music and the showing of television programmes in the public areas of hospitals and on public transport; and to require the wearing of headphones by persons listening to music in the public areas of hospitals and on public transport."

== Other achievements ==
Beaumont was a patron of transgender equality campaign group Press for Change. He was chairman of the Albany Trust between 1969 and 1971, chairman of the Institute of Research into Mental and Multiple Handicap between 1971 and 1973, president of the British Federation of Film Societies between 1973 and 1979, and a member of the executive of Church Action on Poverty. In 1977 he appeared as a contestant on episode 14 of the Mastermind (British game show). He was chairman of "Exit" (as the Voluntary Euthanasia Society, since 2005 Dignity in Dying, was known in the early 1980s) in 1980. He edited The Selective Ego, an abridged volume of the diaries of James Agate, published in 1976, and a Liberal Cookbook, published in 1972. He also wrote a food column for The Illustrated London News from 1976 to 1980, and wrote the book The End of the Yellowbrick Road, published in 1997.

Baron Beaumont of Whitley died at St Thomas' Hospital in London after being hospitalised for several weeks.

== Arms ==
Coat of arms of Tim Beaumont
Coronet A Coronet of a Baron Crest A bull's head erased quarterly Argent and Gules charged with a mullet Sable. Escutcheon Gules a lion rampant Or armed and langued Azure between eight crescents in orle of the second. Supporters Dexter a Phoenix sinister a Pelican vulning herself Proper. Motto Ich Kann Nicht Anders (I Can Do No Other)

Party political offices
Preceded by Baron Granchester; Heather Harvey; J. McLaughlin	Treasurer of the Liberal Party; 1962–1965; With: Ronald Gardner-Thorpe; Andrew Murray	Succeeded by Andrew Murray
Preceded by John Baillie-Hamilton	Chairman of the Liberal Party; 1967–1968	Succeeded by Michael Eden
Preceded by Desmond Banks	President of the Liberal Party; 1969–1970	Succeeded by Inga-Stina Robson
