= Baron Moynihan =

Barony in the Peerage of the United Kingdom

Barony Moynihan
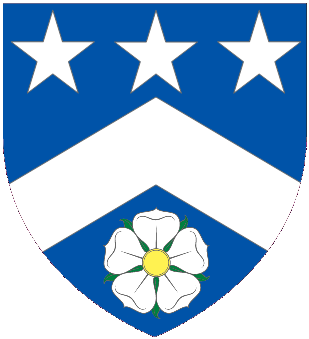
- Arms of the Lord Moynihan
- Creation date: 19 March 1929
- Created by: King George V
- Peerage: Peerage of the United Kingdom
- First holder: Sir Berkeley Moynihan
- Present holder: Colin Moynihan
- Heir apparent: Nicholas Moynihan
- Remainder to: 1st Baron's heirs male of the body lawfully begotten
- Motto: Spiandact Tapeir Neill (Sunshine after rain)

Baron Moynihan, of Leeds in the County of York, is a title in the Peerage of the United Kingdom. It was created on 19 March 1929 for the surgeon Sir Berkeley Moynihan, 1st Baronet, the son of the Victoria Cross recipient Andrew Moynihan. Sir Berkeley had already been created a Baronet, of Carr Manor, in 1922.

The titles fell into a six-year period of dormancy while they were the subject of a dispute on the death of his grandson, the third Baron, in 1991. This involved a complex series of legal proceedings between the third Baron's two sons, born separately by his fourth and fifth wives; the third Baron had believed that the eldest boy, Andrew, was not his son, and favoured the younger, Daniel. They were joined in the dispute by Colin Moynihan, younger half-brother of the third Baron; in March 1994 Colin Moynihan applied for a writ of summons thereby challenging the legitimacy of both sons and claiming the title for himself. In 1996 the Family Division of the High Court ruled that the third Baron's divorce from his fourth wife Editha Eduarda had been obtained by fraud, meaning that his fifth marriage to Jinna Sabiaga had been bigamous and his son by that marriage illegitimate.

After this action had been decided, the Committee of Privileges of the House of Lords ordered DNA testing of Andrew Moynihan, which found that the third Baron was not his father. The Committee therefore resolved the disputed succession in favour of the petition from Colin Moynihan, summing up their decision by saying:

...that neither of the two sons purporting to be the sons of the third Baron can, in fact, be an heir to the peerage. In the case of the elder, Andrew, the committee was shown overwhelming genetic evidence that he cannot be the son of the late Lord Moynihan; and so far as the younger, Daniel, is concerned, the evidence clearly shows that he is the child of a bigamous marriage and is therefore illegitimate. In those circumstances, it is clear beyond doubt that the petitioner, Colin Moynihan, must be the rightful heir and that his Petitions must succeed.

== Barons Moynihan (1929) ==
- Berkeley George Andrew Moynihan, 1st Baron Moynihan (1865–1936)
- Patrick Berkeley Moynihan, 2nd Baron Moynihan (1906–1965)
- Antony Patrick Andrew Caines Berkeley Moynihan, 3rd Baron Moynihan (1936–1991) (dormant 1991)
- Colin Berkeley Moynihan, 4th Baron Moynihan (b. 1955) (claim proved 1997)

The heir apparent is the 4th Baron's elder son, The Hon. Nicholas Ewen Berkeley Moynihan (born 31 March 1994).

== Arms ==
Coat of arms of Baron Moynihan

Crest
A demi-knights in armour affrontee resting the sinister hand on the hip Proper and supporting with the dexter hand a spear also Proper flowing therefrom a forked pennon Argent charged with a Maltese Cross Sable.
Escutcheon
Azure a chevron between in chief three mullets Argent and in base a rose also Argent barbed and seeded Proper.
Supporters
On either side an owl Argent gorged with a baron's coronet Or.
