= Turkish Military Cemetery =

Cemetery in Marsa, Malta

- Iċ-Ċimiterju tat-Torok
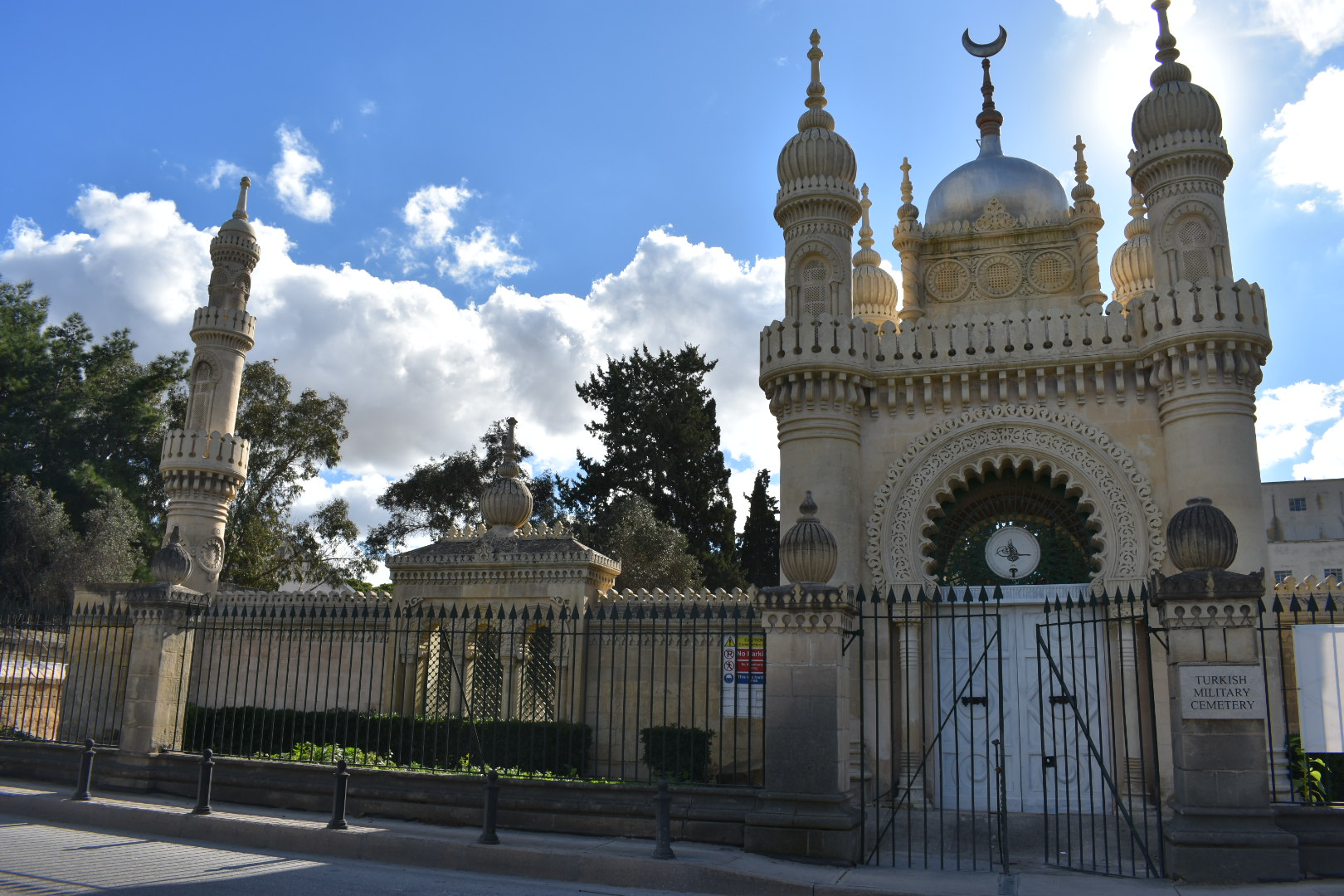
- The Turkish Military Cemetery in 2017
- Interactive map of Turkish Military Cemetery

Details
- Established: 1874
- Location: Marsa, Malta
- Coordinates: 35°52′24″N 14°29′38″E
- Style: Neo-Ottoman (Indo-Mughal – Oriental Eclecticism)
- Owned by: Government of Turkey
- Size: 2,372 m^{2} (25,530 sq ft)

The Turkish Military Cemetery (Maltese: Iċ-Ċimiterju tat-Torok; Turkish: Türk Şehitliği), also known as the Ottoman Military Cemetery (Turkish: Osmanlı Şehitliği), is a cemetery in Marsa, Malta. Commissioned by the Ottoman sultan Abdul Aziz to replace an earlier Muslim cemetery, it was constructed between 1873 and 1874. The cemetery was designed by the Maltese architect Emanuele Luigi Galizia, and it is built in an exotic orientalist style. It is maintained by the Turkish government. Originally the cemetery was referred to as the Mahomedan Cemetery such as on documents, and also referred to as the Martyrs’ Cemetery in Turkey such as on a historic painting.

== History ==
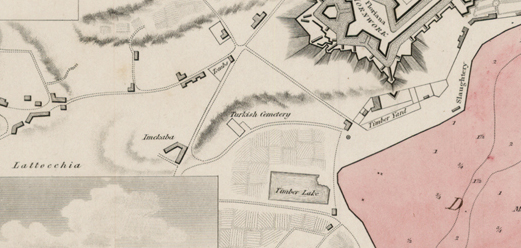
1675–1865 Turkish Cemetery at Spencer Hill (Via della Croce), Marsa/Hamrun

A number of Muslim cemeteries have been located in various locations around Marsa since the 16th century. A cemetery in il-Menqa contained the graves of Ottoman soldiers killed in the Great Siege of Malta of 1565 as well as Muslim slaves who died in Malta. This cemetery was replaced in 1675 by another one near Spencer Hill (Via della Croce), following the construction of the Floriana Lines. Human remains believed to originate from one of these cemeteries were discovered during road works in 2012. The 17th-century cemetery had to be relocated in 1865 to make way for planned road works, with one tombstone dating to 1817 being conserved at the National Museum of Archaeology in Valletta. The remains of a cemetery, together with the foundations of a mosque, and an even more earlier Roman period remains are located at Triq Dicembru 13, Marsa.

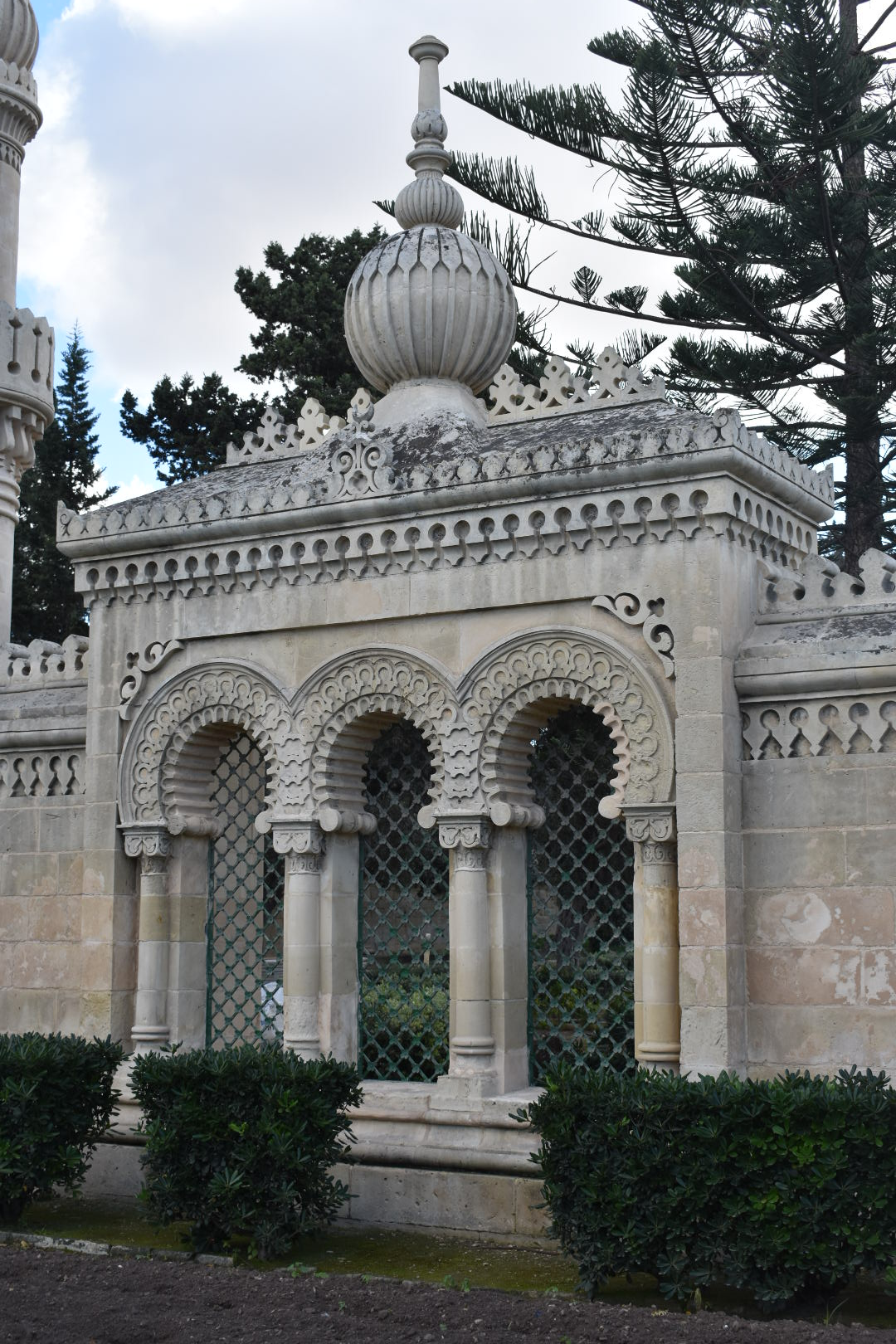
Intricate geometric details

A piece of land in the Ta' Sammat area of Marsa was chosen as the new location in 1871. The new cemetery was commissioned by the Ottoman sultan Abdülaziz, and it was constructed between 1873 and 1874. Construction took over six months to complete. It was designed by the Maltese architect Emanuele Luigi Galizia, who designed many other buildings in a range of contrasting styles, including the mixed-denomination Ta' Braxia Cemetery and the Catholic Addolorata Cemetery. The outcome and reception of the later was pertinent for the appointment of Galizia as the architect of the Turkish Military Cemetery. The design for the project was unique in Maltese architecture at that point. Galizia was awarded the Order of the Medjidie by the Ottoman sultan for designing the Turkish cemetery, and thus was made a Knight of that order. At the end of the 19th century the cemetery became a landmark by its own due to its picturesque architecture. On the turn of the 20th century it became an obligation to acquire a permission from the Health Department for each burial within the cemetery for sanitary purposes.

Due to the absence of a mosque at the time, the cemetery was generally used for Friday prayers until the construction of a mosque in Paola. The small mosque at the cemetery was intended to be used for prayers during an occasional burial ceremony, but the building and the courtyard of the cemetery became frequently used as the only public prayer site for Muslims until the early 1970s. A properly sized mosque was designed by Architect Galizia but the project was abandoned. The plans are available in Turkish archives in Istanbul which hold the words "Progetto di una moschea – Cimitero Musulmano" (Project for a mosque – Muslim Cemetery). A possible reason for shelving the project was the economic situation and political decline of the Ottoman Empire. The place became too small eventually for the growing Muslim community.

A Jewish cemetery was built directly adjacent to the Turkish cemetery in 1879. It was designed by the English architect Webster Paulson in a neoclassical style. Lieutenant-Governor Sir Harry Luke, perhaps unaware that Turkic people are not Arabs, later stated that the area "is the only place in the world where Arabs and Jews lie peacefully together."

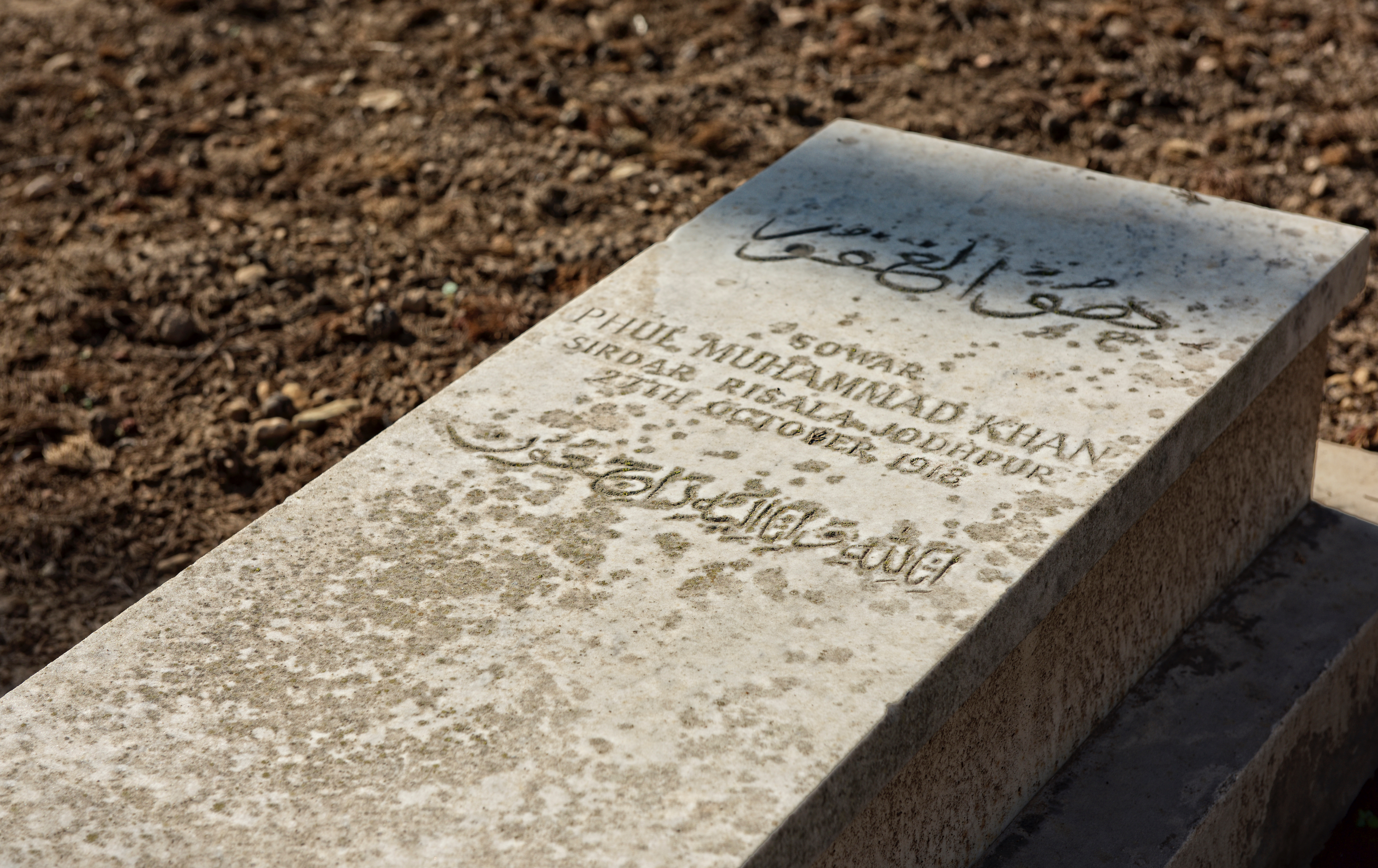
World War I-era grave marker in the cemetery

The bodies of 23 Moroccan passengers recovered from the SS Sardinia disaster in 1908 were buried at the Turkish Military Cemetery. The passengers had been on the way to Mecca for the Hajj pilgrimage when the ship burst into flames, killing at least 118 people. During World War I, some Turkish prisoners of war who died in Malta were buried inside the cemetery. The cemetery was restored from March 1919 to October 1920, during which period it also saw renovation with the addition of a monument commemorating the World War I prisoners of war who died in Malta and the building of a prominent fountain. The project was executed by the Ottoman Officer Kuşcubaşı Eşref Bey. The cemetery also contains the graves of some Muslim soldiers from Commonwealth countries (seven from World War I and four from World War II) as well as fifteen French soldiers. The Commonwealth and French war graves are cared for by the Commonwealth War Graves Commission.

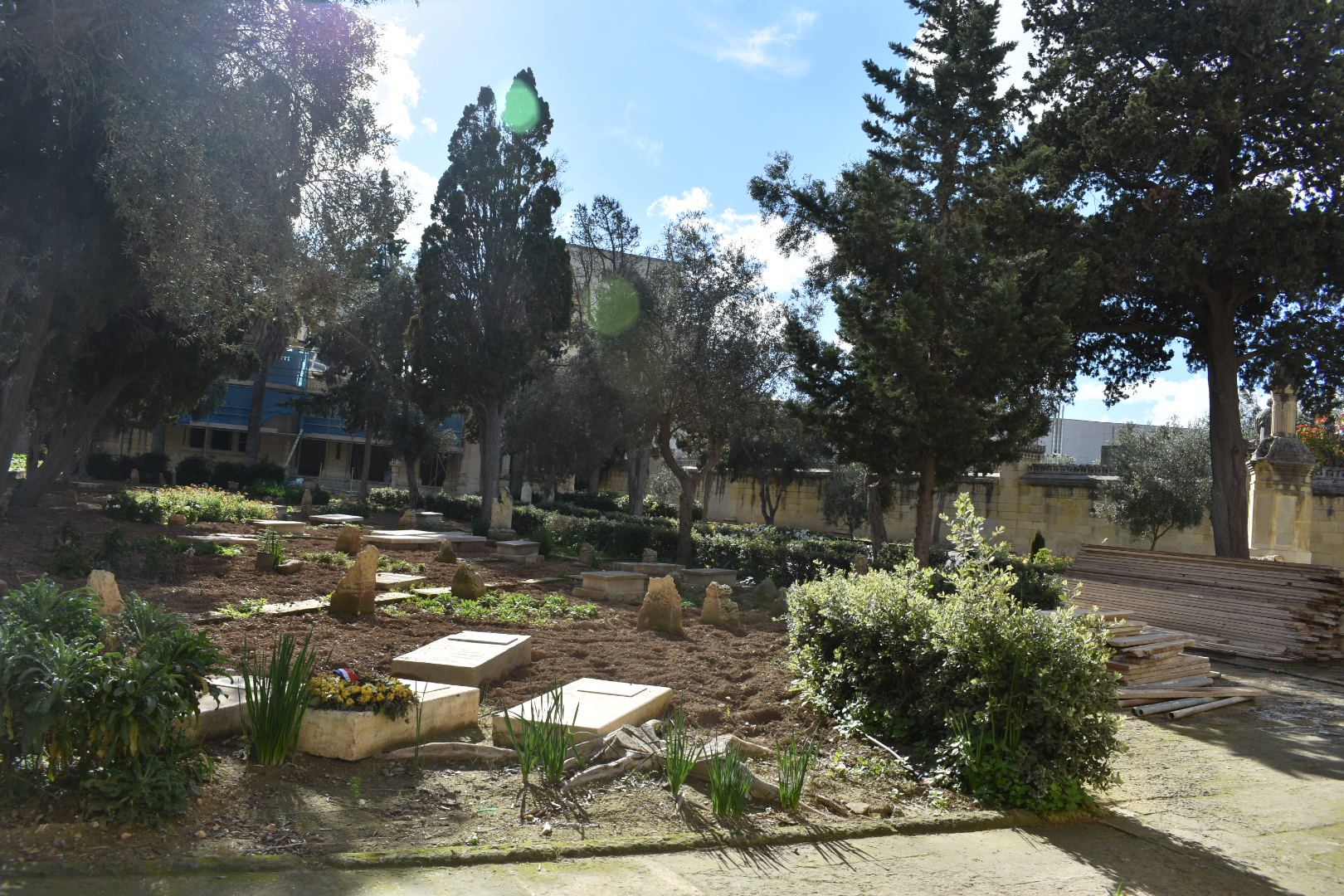
Inside the cemetery

The cemetery was evidently lacking maintenance with its decay observed in early 2002. It further fell into a state of disrepair after a new Muslim cemetery was opened near the Mariam Al-Batool Mosque in Paola in 2006. Deterioration occurred since the area is prone to flooding, due to pollution since the site is close to major roads, and due to natural factors such as lightning strikes which damaged some architectural details. Further damage has been caused by car accidents. A project to restore the cemetery began in 2015, being sponsored by the Turkish government.

In July 2016 there was a planning application for a fuel station next to the cemetery and, if a favourable decision would have been taken, this may have been a possible ‘burial’ to the architecture of the cemetery itself. The application, presented by the company Cassar Fuel, was opposed by the Turkish government and several Maltese entities. Another development application on the same site was submitted to the planning authority in August 2019 for an industrial garage, which received opposition by the Marsa Local Council and the Turkish government representatives. In November 2019 the applicant withdrew the proposed development. Fondazzjoni Wirt Artna has suggested to completely clear the nearby derelict building and instead of new commercial activity the area may be renovated into a landscaped open space, how it initially was meant to be.

Today the cemetery falls under the responsibility of the Turkish government, and it is scheduled as a Grade 1 building. It is usually inaccessible to the public and people must first contact the Turkish embassy to arrange a visit. Turkish Minister for Agriculture, Food and Livestock Mehmet Mehdi Eker visited the cemetery in 2012. Prime Minister Binali Yıldırım visited the cemetery in 2017. Foreign Minister Hakan Fidan visited the cemetery in 2024.

== Architecture ==
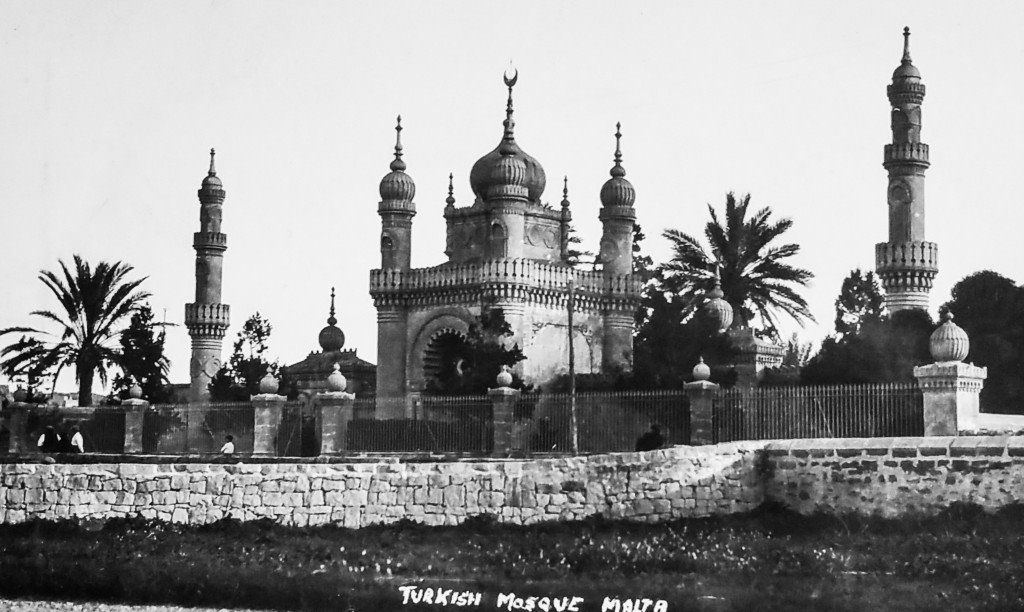
Photo showing the cemetery at the turn of the 20th century

The Turkish Military Cemetery is designed in a flamboyant, eclectic and exotic style related to the Orientalist and Romantic movements. The Royal Pavilion in Brighton by John Nash probably served as a source of inspiration. The writer and artist Terrance Mikail Patrick Duggan has called the cemetery "the Ottoman Taj Mahal" and has referred to it as "the least known and certainly today the most important surviving nineteenth century Ottoman building to have been built beyond the borders of the Ottoman Sultanate."

The cemetery is built out of Maltese limestone, and some of the stonework contains intricately carved geometric designs. It has a rectangular plan, and the walled enclosure includes minaret-like structures. The entrance is through a central structure which has an onion dome and four minarets. All minarets are topped with proportionate limestone copulas. Inside the cemetery there is an arcaded structure with horseshoe arches, and an ablution fountain in an open courtyard.

Without exception, all those buried at the cemetery are to be assumed as professing the Islamic faith before their death. The grave markers in the cemetery are orientated such that they face Mecca. 19th and early 20th centuries tombs bear old Turkish inscription with the use of Islamic calligraphy. People buried in the cemetery originate from different countries, including Turkey, Algeria, Egypt, French Polynesia, Libya, India, Indonesia, Morocco, Myanmar and Somalia. While the Ottoman Sultan was a Muslim, his consulate who managed the realisation of the project was a Jew (Naum Duhanî Efendi), and the architect a Roman Catholic. A marble with French inscription commemorates this inside the cemetery.

The inscription reads:

ALORS – QUE – LE – SOLEIL – SERA – COURBÉ
ET – LES – ÉTOILES – TOMBERONT
DES – TOMBEAUX – SCELLÉS – PAR – LA – MORT
SERONT – BOULEVERSÉS
ET – DE – CE – LIT – DE – POUSSIÈRE
EVEILLÉS – DU – SOMMEIL
SORTIRONT – ROYONNANTS
LES – ENFANTS – DE – LA – FOI – ET – DE – LA – PRIÈRE
_______
DIEU – N’EST – IL – PAS – ASSEZ – PUISSANT
POUR – FAIRE – REVIVRE – LES – MORTS
_______
ÉRIGÉ – EN – L’ANNÉE – DE – L’HÉGIRE – 1290
SOUS – LE – RÈGNE – DE – SA – MAJESTÈ – IMPÉRIAL
ABDUL – AZIZ – KHAN
EMPEREUR – DES – OTTOMANS
NAOUM – DUHANY- EFEENDY
SON – CONSUL – GÉNÉRAL – À – MALTE
_______
E. L. GALIZIA – ARCHITECTE

(Meaning: As the sun will set and the stars will fall, tombs sealed by death will be disturbed and from this bed of dust awakened from sleep they will emerge radiant the children of the faith and of prayer.
_______
Is not God mighty enough to revive the dead?
_______
Erected in the year 1290AH (1874) during the reign of his Imperial Majesty Abdul Aziz Khan Emperor of the Ottomans.
Naoum Duhany Efeendy – his Consul General to Malta.
_______
E. L. Galizia – Architect)

A picture of the cemetery appears on an official postcard.

== See also ==
- Islam in Malta
- Moorish Revival architecture
