= Lord Moynihan =

Lord Moynihan may refer to:

- Baron Moynihan, a title in the Peerage of the United Kingdom created in 1929
- Jon Moynihan, Baron Moynihan of Chelsea (born 1948), British businessman
