= SS Sardinia (1888) =

Passenger-cargo ship

History
- Name: Gulf of Corcovado (1888–99); Paolo V (1899–1902); Sardinia (1902–08)
- Owner: Greenock Steam Ship Co Ltd (1888–99); Gulf Line Ltd (1899); P Viale di GB (1899–1902); Ellerman Lines Ltd (1902–08)
- Builder: Hawthorn Leslie and Company, Hebburn, England
- Yard number: 280
- Launched: 25 June 1888
- Completed: August 1888
- Identification: Reg. Number: 93204
- Fate: Destroyed by fire 25 November 1908

General characteristics
- Type: Passenger-cargo ship
- Tonnage: 2361 GRT; 1482 NRT
- Length: 310 ft (94 m)
- Draught: 22.6 ft (6.9 m)
- Installed power: Triple-expansion engine
- Propulsion: Screw propeller

SS Sardinia was a passenger-cargo ship which caught fire off Malta's Grand Harbour on 25 November 1908, resulting in at least 118 deaths. The ship was carrying Moroccan pilgrims on the way to Mecca. It is believed that a cooking fire on deck accidentally ignited nitrate in one of the ship's cargo holds, resulting in a number of explosions and causing the ship to run aground.

The vessel had been built in 1888 and had previously been known as Gulf of Corcovado and Paolo V.

== Description ==
The Sardinia had a tonnage of 2361 GRT or 1482 NRT. She was 310 ft (94 m) long, and she had a draught of 22.6 ft (6.9 m). The vessel had a triple-expansion engine manufactured by Blair & Co Ltd, and she was propelled by a screw propeller.

== Career ==
The Sardinia was built as Gulf of Corcovado by Hawthorn Leslie and Company at Hebburn. She was launched on 25 June 1888 and was completed the following August. The vessel was owned by the Greenock Steam Ship Co Ltd of Greenock, Scotland.

In 1899, the vessel was acquired by Gulf Line Ltd. Later that year, she was acquired by P Viale di GB of Genoa, Italy, who renamed the vessel Paolo V. In 1902, she was acquired by Ellerman Lines of Liverpool, and she was renamed Sardinia.

== Fire ==
On 25 November 1908, the Sardinia left Malta's Grand Harbour en route to Alexandria at 09.45am. She was carrying 39 crew members, 12 first class passengers and 142 steerage passengers who were Muslims from Morocco who were on their way to Mecca for the Hajj pilgrimage. The vessel was also carrying some general cargo which included nitrate or naphtha. She was captained by Charles Littler from Birkenhead.

Soon after the vessel left the harbour, fumes were seen coming out of a ventilator on the ship's port side. The crew attempted to fight the fire by hosing it with water down the ventilator, but this effort was futile. Within a couple of minutes, flames appeared out of other ventilators as well. When the vessel was about 200 metres (660 ft) away from the breakwater, thick smoke was seen coming out of her starboard side. The fire probably started when embers from a pilgrim's cooking brazier came into contact with the cargo of nitrate held in the vessel's No. 2 hold. In less than 10 minutes, the Sardinia's amidships was engulfed by flames.

The vessel changed course, probably in an attempt to return to the harbour. However, it soon began to move in circles as the crew abandoned the wheel and lost control over the rudder, while the crew in the engine room were all killed in the fire. While the vessel was turning, it ran aground off Fort Ricasoli. Multiple explosions tore through the vessel and blew off hatches, probably causing loss of life. Strong winds made the fire worse, and it reached the top deck and destroyed the ship's lifeboats.

Captain Littler stayed on board the vessel and was one of the first to be killed in the fire. The crew handed out lifebelts to the passengers, although one of the chief cabin attendants was one of the first to jump overboard. Many of the Moroccan passengers, who included many women and children, had been below deck and died, while others who were on deck panicked and refused to abandon ship. Some of the people on board the ship managed to jump into the water and were rescued.

Small boats with Maltese fishermen and sailors attempted to reach the Sardinia to help the survivors, but they were unable to reach the burning vessel due to the intensity of the flames. Admiralty tugboats were also sent to the scene. The ship was left to burn out on the rocks as thousands of people gathered on the harbour's fortifications to witness the disaster.

=== Victims ===
Sources conflict as to how many people on the ship died and how many were rescued. Some sources state that only 23 crew members and 10 passengers survived, while others state that 21 crew members, 9 European passengers and 40 Moroccan passengers were rescued. By 16.00 on the day of the accident, 18 crew members, 5 European passengers, and 100 Moroccans were missing. The final death toll was also reported to be 16 crew members, 2 European passengers and over 100 Moroccans. Therefore, it can be said that the final death toll was at least 118 people.

At least 40 bodies were recovered on the day of the accident, including that of the captain. Post mortem examinations revealed that those who died had either burned to death or drowned. Only 23 of the Moroccan pilgrims' bodies were recovered. They were taken to the Central Civil Hospital, and they were buried at the Turkish Military Cemetery in Marsa on the following day. The captain and some crew members were buried at Ta' Braxia Cemetery, as were three other bodies who were recovered later. At least one victim was buried at the Addolorata Cemetery. Captain Littler's remains were later returned to England and reburied there.

== Aftermath ==
An inquiry found that the fire originated in No. 2 hold and it was probably caused through the pilgrims' carelessness due to cooking fires on deck. The inquiry found that there were no precautions to prevent fire on board the vessel.

The Sardinia disaster is regarded as Malta's worst peacetime maritime disaster, and it has been called Malta's counterpart of the Titanic. Although the Sardinia was smaller and carried far fewer passengers than the Titanic, the comparison was made because of the large proportion of lower class passengers who perished in the disaster.
