= Ta' Braxia Cemetery =

Cemetery in Il-Ħamrun, Malta

- Iċ-Ċimiterju ta' Braxia
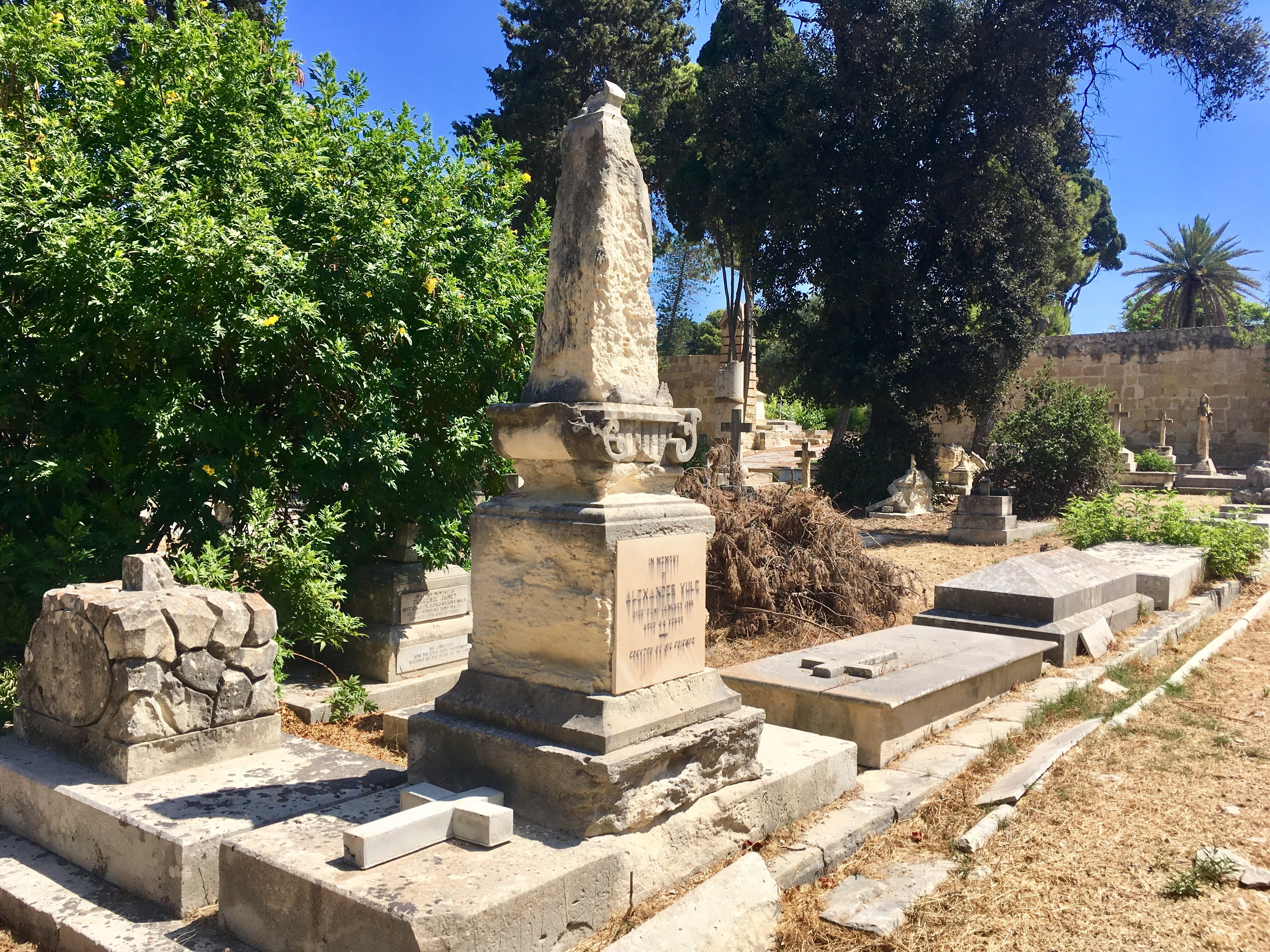
- Funerary monuments at Ta' Braxia Cemetery
- Interactive map of Ta' Braxia Cemetery

Details
- Established: October 1857
- Location: Il-Ħamrun, Malta
- Coordinates: 35°53′24″N 14°29′52″E

Ta' Braxia Cemetery (Maltese: Iċ-Ċimiterju ta' Braxia) is a cemetery in Ħamrun, located near the boundary between Il-Ħamrun, Il-Furjana, and Gwardamanġa, Malta. It was built between 1855 and 1857 as a multi-denomination burial ground primarily intended for British servicemen, partially replacing a number of earlier 18th century cemeteries. The site also incorporates a Jewish cemetery which was established in around 1830. The cemetery's construction was controversial since the local ecclesiastical authorities were opposed to a multi-faith extra-mural cemetery.

The cemetery was designed by the Maltese architect Emanuele Luigi Galizia. It was expanded a number of times during the 19th century, and in 1893–94 a memorial chapel dedicated to Lady Rachel Hamilton-Gordon was added. The chapel was designed by the English architect John Loughborough Pearson in a combination of the Gothic Revival and Romanesque Revival styles.

== History ==
Ta' Braxia Cemetery is located just outside the Floriana Lines, the outer fortifications of Malta's capital Valletta. The first cemetery on this site was established in 1778, and it was known as the Cemetery of the Sacra Infermeria. This was the first extra-mural cemetery in Malta. The site also contained some other old cemeteries, including a plague cemetery and a Jewish cemetery which was established in around 1830. By the middle of the 19th century, the area had "become a heath, covered with a heap of rubbish, thorns and nettlebrushes... a common field laid waste without even a central cross or chapel as prescribed by the ritual of the Catholic Church."

By 1850, the British wanted to establish a multi-faith cemetery for servicemen who died in Malta, after the Msida Bastion Cemetery became full. The decision was taken to re-lay and extend the cemetery at Ta' Braxia, which was chosen due to its proximity to the main urban centres of Valletta and the Three Cities. The cemetery was said to be meant for "all religions without distinction" but this only referred to different Christian denominations, excluding other religions, although the pre-existing Jewish cemetery would eventually be incorporated as a separate section into Ta' Braxia. The construction of the cemetery was perceived as a move to establish a predominantly Protestant cemetery.

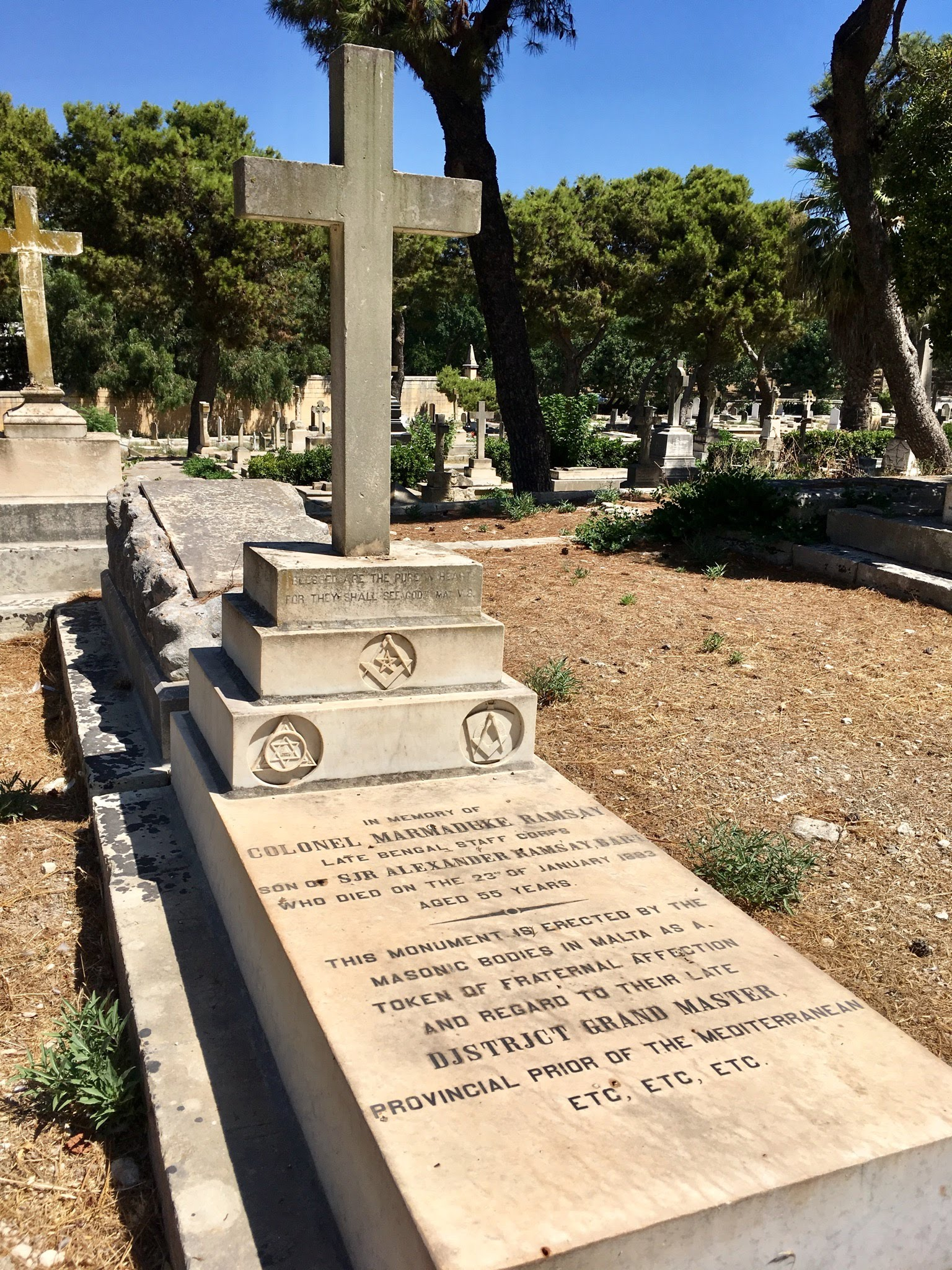
Funerary monument of a British serviceman who died in 1893, decorated with masonic iconography

The establishment of the cemetery was intended to promote extra-mural burial for the upper classes. At the time, the concept of having an extra-mural cemetery was controversial since traditionally people were buried inside churches or chapels. The local ecclesiastical authorities were particularly opposed to extra-mural cemeteries. Further controversy arose since the church was strongly opposed to having a mixed-rite cemetery.

The cemetery was designed by the Maltese architect Emanuele Luigi Galizia, and it was his first major government project. Galizia would later design two other major cemeteries: the Catholic Addolorata Cemetery and the Muslim Turkish Military Cemetery. Work on the cemetery commenced in 1855, with the construction of the boundary walls. The military authorities had to approve its designs so as to ensure that the cemetery would not compromise the fortifications. It officially opened in October 1857, and the opening was not reported in local media. The alteration of an adjacent road in 1861 led to the relocation of a nearby Catholic burial ground and permitted the cemetery's expansion. A southward expansion was undertaken in 1879, and another major expansion took place in 1889.

The cemetery became the main burial ground for the British garrison during the second half of the 19th century. Three bodies recovered from the SS Sardinia disaster in 1908 were buried at Ta' Braxia. The Commonwealth War Graves Commission cares for the graves of eight Commonwealth soldiers buried in the cemetery, five from World War I and three from World War II.

During World War II, aerial bombardment damaged or destroyed some of the headstones and funerary monuments at the cemetery. Other monuments have been damaged due to erosion. Din l-Art Ħelwa and the government set up a committee to restore the cemetery in 2000. An association known as Friends of Ta' Braxia was set up in 2001, and it is responsible for the maintenance and restoration of the cemetery, with the assistance of Din l-Art Ħelwa. Today the cemetery is open to the public on weekdays.

== Architecture ==
The cemetery has a grid layout, with the main entrance gate aligned on the central axis. It originally had a symmetrical layout, but this element has been lost due to later expansions of the cemetery. Internal gateways and retaining walls delineate different sectors within the cemetery. The cemetery includes Greek and Jewish sections, and a fountain which was designed by Galizia can also be found inside.

The cemetery's architecture is not particularly impressive in itself, but it contains a number of elaborate funerary monuments carved out of stone or marble. Their style ranges from neoclassical to ornate and eclectic. Some monuments have iconography denoting Masonic connections.

== Chapel ==
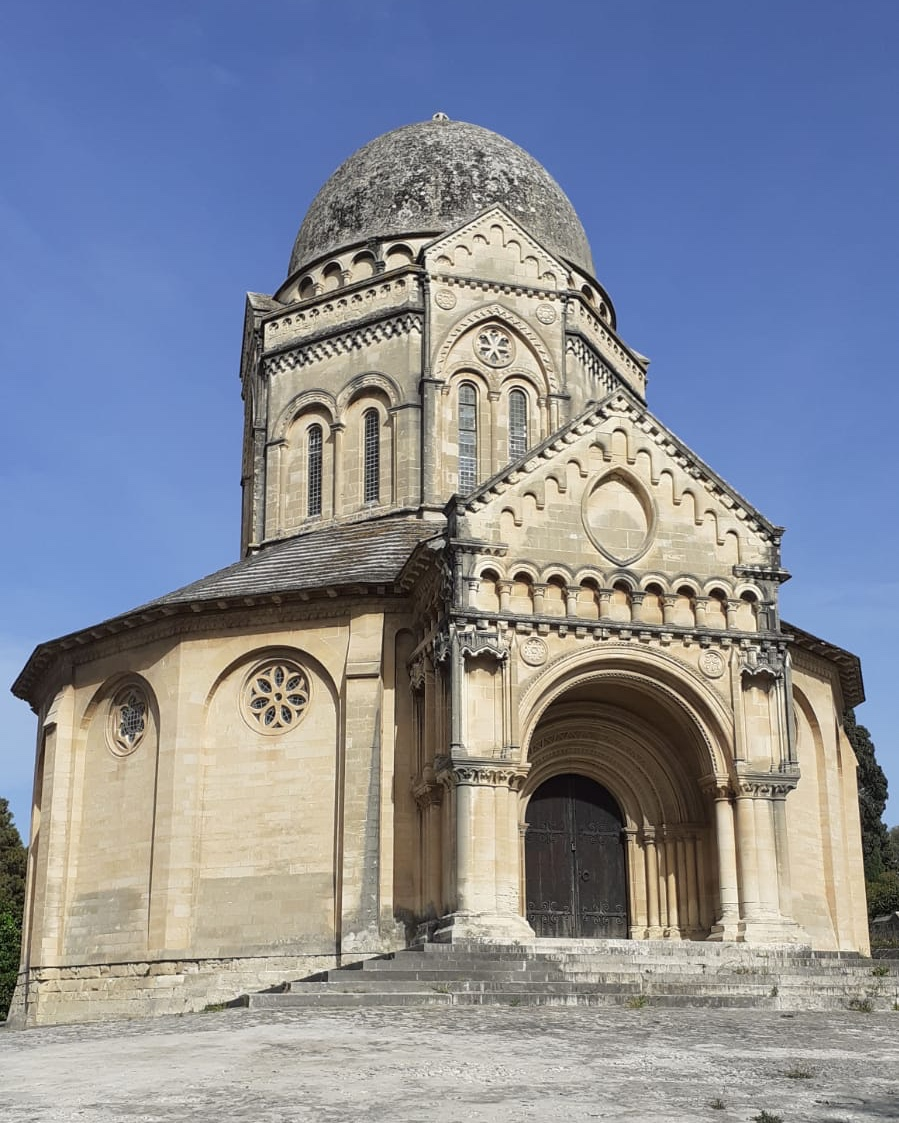
Ta' Braxia Cemetery Chapel

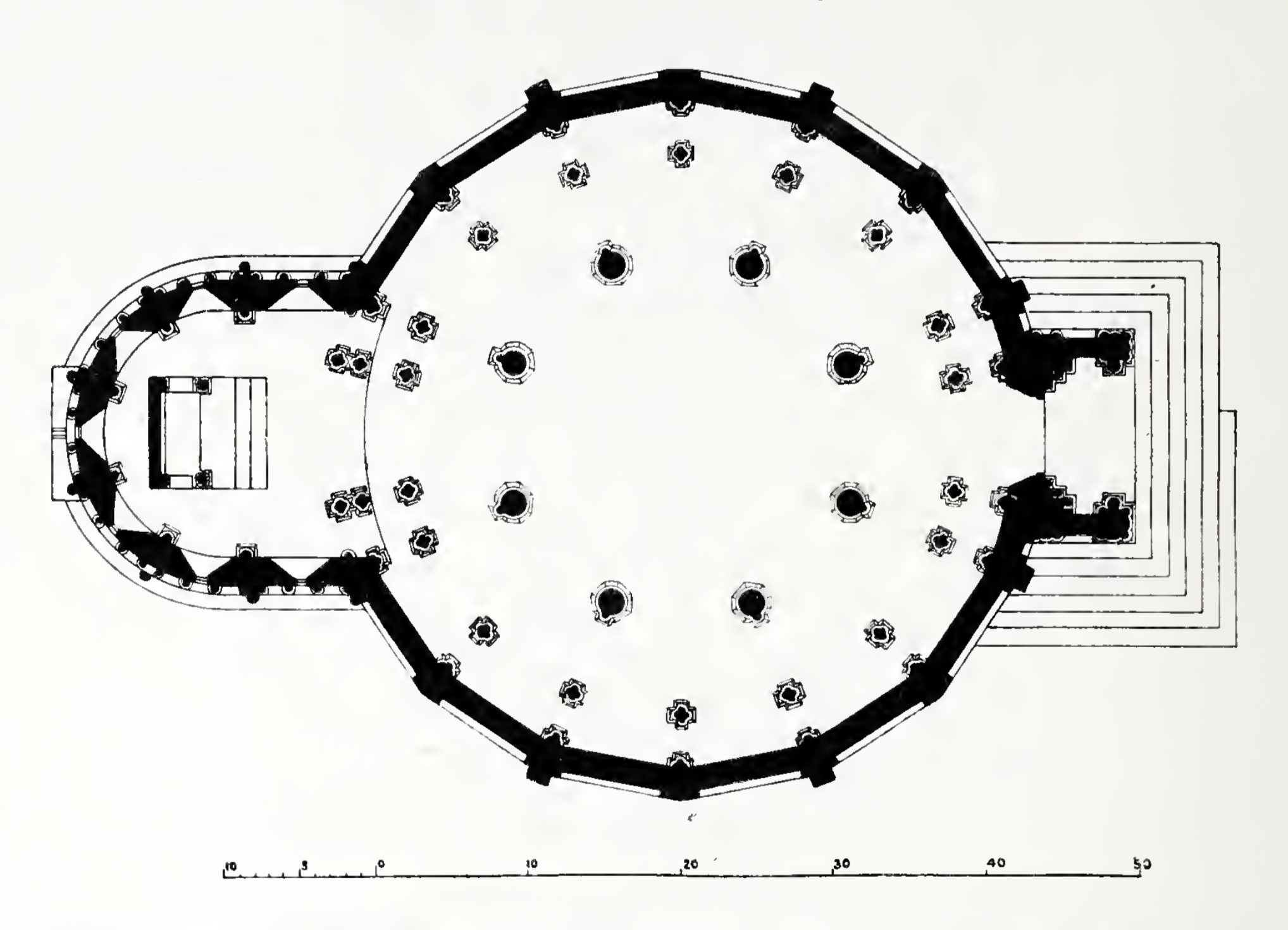
Plan of Ta' Braxia Cemetery Chapel

The main landmark at Ta' Braxia Cemetery is the Lady Rachel Hamilton-Gordon Memorial Chapel, which was built to commemorate the wife of Sir Arthur Hamilton-Gordon, 1st Baron Stanmore. While en route from Ceylon to Britain, Lady Hamilton-Gordon fell ill and died in Malta, being buried at Ta' Braxia on 28 January 1889. Sir Hamilton-Gordon commissioned a leading English architect, John Loughborough Pearson, to design a memorial chapel for his wife. Pearson probably never visited Malta, but prepared the plans which were sent to the island. The chapel's foundation stone was laid down on 28 May 1893 and it was completed in 1894.

The chapel's architecture cannot be categorically classified as belonging to one particular style, since it combines elements from both the Gothic Revival and Romanesque Revival styles. It has a centralized circular plan with a dome. The external façades contain elaborate geometric decoration and ornamentation, which contrast with the relatively plain dome.

== See also ==
- Pietà Military Cemetery, which is located nearby
