= Andrew Murray (Scottish politician) =

Scottish politician

Sir Andrew Hunter Arbuthnot Murray OBE JP KStJ (19 December 1903 – 21 March 1977) was Lord Provost of Edinburgh, Scotland between 1947 and 1951, Lord Lieutenant of the City of Edinburgh, and a Justice of the Peace.

The son of Alfred Alexander Arbuthnot Murray and Bethany (née Moir), Murray was educated Daniel Stewart's College and George Heriot's School. He was elected a City Councillor of Edinburgh in 1929, and served as Hon. City Treasurer 1943–46. He was President of the Scottish Liberal Party Organisation 1961–65.

He was also an Honorary Colonel of the 52nd (Queens Edinburgh Royal Scots) Searchlight, of the 130th Light Anti-Aircraft and of the 587th Light Anti-Aircraft Regiment, Royal Artillery.

Murray was awarded the OBE in 1945, and knighted on 25 February 1949 to become Sir Andrew Murray. He was appointed Commander of the Venerable Order of Saint John, 24 June 1949, and a Knight of St John in 1954. He was Chancellor of the Priory of Scotland and Preceptor of Torphichen.

In 1950, he received an honorary doctorate of law from the University of Edinburgh. On 23 January 1953 he was appointed Deputy Lieutenant of Edinburgh. He was chairman of the board of trustees of the Scottish National War Memorial at The Castle, Edinburgh, and author of The Scottish National War Memorial: The Castle Edinburgh.

== See also ==
- List of Lords Provost of Edinburgh

Honorary titles
Preceded by Sir John Ireland Falconer	Lord Provost of Edinburgh; 1947–1951	Succeeded by Sir James Miller
Party political offices
Preceded by Harold Glanville	President of the Liberal Party; 1960–1961	Succeeded by Edwin Malindine
Preceded by Archibald Sinclair	President of the Scottish Liberal Party; 1961–1965	Succeeded by John Bannerman
Preceded by Baron Granchester; Heather Harvey; J. McLaughlin	Treasurer of the Liberal Party; 1962–1966; With: Ronald Gardner-Thorpe (1962–1965); Timothy Beaumont (1963–1965)	Succeeded by Jeremy Thorpe
