= Ronald Gardner-Thorpe =

British politician (1917–1991)

Colonel Sir Ronald Gardner-Thorpe GBE KStJ TD JP DL

Lord Mayor of London
- In office 1980–1981

Personal details
- Born: Ronald Laurence Gardner-Thorpe; 13 May 1917
- Died: 11 December 1991 (aged 74)

Colonel Sir Ronald Laurence Gardner-Thorpe (13 May 1917 – 11 December 1991) was a British company director and Liberal Party politician who also became the 653rd Lord Mayor of London in 1980.

== Background ==
Gardner-Thorpe was the son of Joseph Gardner and Hannah Coulthurst Thorpe. He was educated at St John's College, Portsmouth. In 1938 he married Hazel Mary Dees. They had one son.

== Political career ==
Gardner-Thorpe was Liberal candidate for the Eastbourne division of Sussex at the 1959 General Election. The Liberals had not run a candidate at the previous election in 1955. He managed a respectable 18% poll, finishing third. He was joint honorary treasurer of the Liberal Party, a member of the party executive and President of the Home Counties Young Liberals.

He was Liberal candidate at the 1962 West Derbyshire by-election. The election took place at a period where the Liberal Party's fortunes were on the rise following victory in the Orpington by-election. Again, no Liberal had stood at the previous general election; despite this, he was able to poll nearly a third of the vote, push Labour into third place and come within 1,200 votes of gaining the seat from the Conservatives. He was Liberal candidate again for West Derbyshire at the 1964 General Election. However this time, the Conservatives regained some lost support and Gardner-Thorpe remained second. He did not stand for parliament again. He was elected Sheriff of London in 1978 and Lord Mayor of London in 1980. In 1980 he was knighted a Knight Grand Cross of the Order of the British Empire (GBE).

=== Electoral record ===
General Election 1959: Eastbourne
Party	Candidate	Votes	%	±%
Conservative	Charles Stuart Taylor	27,874	57.3	−8.4
Labour	A A Dumont	11,837	24.3	−10.0
Liberal	Ronald Laurence Gardner-Thorpe	8,955	18.4	n/a
Majority		16,037	33.0	+1.6
Turnout		48,666	77.3	
Conservative hold		Swing	+0.8	

1962 West Derbyshire by-election
Party	Candidate	Votes	%	±%
Conservative	Aidan Merivale Crawley	12,455	36.0	−25.3
Liberal	Ronald Laurence Gardner-Thorpe	11,235	32.5	+32.5
Labour	John Dilks	9,431	27.2	−11.5
Independent	Raymond Gregory	1,433	4.1	+4.1
Majority		1,220		
Turnout				
Conservative hold		Swing		

General Election 1964: West Derbyshire
Party	Candidate	Votes	%	±%
Conservative	Aidan Merivale Crawley	16,825	44.2	+8.2
Liberal	Ronald Laurence Gardner-Thorpe	11,559	30.4	−2.1
Labour	John Dilks	9,669	25.4	−1.8
Majority		5,266	13.8	+10.3
Turnout			85.8	
Conservative hold		Swing	+5.1	

== Honours/Awards ==
- GBE (1980)
- KStJ (1980)
- TD (1948)
- Hon DCL London (1980)
- Hon DH Lewis Chicago (1981)
- Hon FRCP (1986)

Party political offices
Preceded by Baron Granchester; Heather Harvey; J. McLaughlin	Treasurer of the Liberal Party; 1962–1965; With: Andrew Murray (1962–1965); Timothy Beaumont (1963–1965)	Succeeded by Andrew Murray
Civic offices
Preceded by Sir Peter Gadsden	Lord Mayor of London; 1980–1981	Succeeded by Sir Christopher Leaver
