= Philip Fothergill =

Philip Fothergill

Charles Philip Fothergill (23 February 1906 – 31 January 1959) was an English woollen manufacturer and Liberal Party politician.

== Family and education ==
Fothergill was born in Dewsbury into a radical, nonconformist, Yorkshire family. He was educated at the Wheelwright School for Boys, in Dewsbury, Yorkshire and Bootham School in York. He never married.

== Career ==
The Fothergill family were closely connected to the Yorkshire textile industry and Philip followed the family tradition. He went into business as a woollen manufacturer and merchant, eventually rising to become chairman and managing director of C P Fothergill & Co. Ltd of Dewsbury. He was also a governing director of Fothergill (Edinburgh) Ltd. In his work he became acutely aware of a series of labour, welfare and trade union issues and this prompted a strong interest in labour economics which he was to put to use in business and politics. Fothergill was also a Director of the newspaper the Dewsbury Reporter and other papers in the area which had Liberal leanings

== Politics ==
=== Parliamentary ambitions ===
Fothergill developed an interest in Liberal politics as a young man, serving on the National Executive of the party as early as the 1920s. His business interests were in Scotland, where he had large commercial and industrial interests north of the River Tweed as well as in Yorkshire and his local political activities reflected this geography. He was a Liberal candidate for Parliament three times although he was never elected. He first contested Forfarshire at the 1945 general election. In 1947 he expressed an interest in becoming Liberal candidate for Orkney and Shetland at a time when Jo Grimond had still not finally decided to try his luck there again.

He next fought Middlesbrough West in 1950. Middlesbrough West had been a Liberal seat until the 1945 general election and there was talk that the Conservatives would give Fothergill a free run there in an anti-socialist pact in return for the lack of a Liberal candidate in Middlesbrough East. This came to nothing however and the results of the election seem to indicate it would have made little difference to Labour's ability to hold Middlesbrough East. The combined Liberal-Tory vote in Middlesbrough West would have beaten Labour's total but the Conservatives were so far ahead of Fothergill it is understandable they were unwilling to stand aside for him.

Fothergill's final attempt to enter the House of Commons came at Oldham West in 1951, when he lost his deposit.

=== Radical Action ===
Originally known as the Liberal Action Group, Radical Action was a pressure group of rank and file members inside the Liberal Party during the Second World War, opposing the party truce which the leadership had entered into with the Labour Party and the Conservatives. Radical Action also sought to distance the party from the Liberal Nationals. Fothergill later maintained this stance, particularly in respect of the proposed Liberal-Liberal National merger talks which were progressing in Scotland during 1946–1947 the terms of which Fothergill, together with party leader Clement Davies and leader in the House of Lords, Herbert Samuel felt were totally unacceptable. Fothergill became a leading member of Radical Action, holding the position of Treasurer. Importantly, in view of Fothergill's later role in party organisation, Radical Action also wanted a radical overhaul of the party's electoral machine.

=== Party posts ===
Fothergill had become Chairman of the Liberal Party in 1946 and held the post until 1949. In this role he played a significant part in party reconstruction and under his leadership the re-establishment of many local and constituency parties took place. At the 1947 party assembly, Fothergill reported that over 500 active associations existed compared with only 200 some eight months before. This led to the party putting up more candidates the 1950 general election than they had since 1929. The strategy served the party well, even in the wake of the very poor results of the 1950 and 1951 elections, as the broad structure of the party on the ground was maintained – unlike the 1930s when many local associations just disappeared. Together with other committed party officers like Edward Martell and Frank Byers, Fothergill helped sustain the party through some of its darkest days. According to one commentator who knew him well, Fothergill was the closest the Liberal Party had to a Herbert Morrison, someone with an acute political brain who knew the value of organisation.

From 1959–1952 Fothergill was President of the party; he was again chairman in 1952 and was Joint Treasurer from 1954–59. From 1954–1955 he served as president of the National League of Young Liberals. Fothergill also served as a member of the executive committee of the Scottish Liberal Party and as sometime Chairman of the Scottish Liberal Agricultural Committee. Jo Grimond later said of Fothergill that it was tragedy he never got into the House of Commons or that Life Peerages were not invented in his lifetime.

== Temperance campaigner ==
Reflecting his radical, nonconformist background, Fothergill was a strong advocate of temperance reform and the evils of alcohol. He was Chairman of the temperance movement the United Kingdom Alliance from 1952 until his death. By religion he was a lifelong Congregationalist.

== Other appointments ==
Fothergill served as sometime Chairman of the Joseph Rowntree Social Service Trust. He was a Trustee of the Civil Defence Welfare Fund, a Member of the Council of the Central Council of Physical Recreation and he held the post of Deputy Transport Commissioner for Scotland from 1943–45. He was also a member of the council of the Hansard Society.

== Ill-health and death ==
Fothergill, who had suffered from chronic ill-health for many years, including the effects of gout died suddenly aged just 52 years at his home in Dewsbury on 31 January 1959. He had survived long enough to witness the Liberal by-election victory at Torrington in 1958, the first Liberal gain in a by-election since 1929 but not to see the further fruits of Liberal revival such as Orpington or the general election gains of 1964 and of 1966 which he done so much to lay the foundations for.

Party political offices
| Preceded by Milner Gray | Chairman of the Liberal Party; 1946–1949 | Succeeded by Patrick Moynihan |
| Preceded by Andrew McFadyean | President of the Liberal Party; 1950–1952 | Succeeded by Ronald Walker |
| Preceded by Frank Byers | Chairman of the Liberal Party; 1952–1954 | Succeeded by Geoffrey Acland |
| Preceded by Baron Moynihan; Wulff Henry Grey | Treasurer of the Liberal Party; 1955–1959; With: Wulff Henry Grey (1955–1958); Baron Granchester | Succeeded by Baron Granchester; Heather Harvey; Patrick Lort-Phillips |
