= 1962 West Derbyshire by-election =

UK Parliamentary by-election

The 1962 West Derbyshire by-election was held on 6 June 1962 after the incumbent Conservative MP, Edward Wakefield, was appointed as Commissioner for Malta. It was retained by the Conservative candidate Aidan Crawley.

It is the largest loss in share of the vote suffered by the Conservative candidate, when the Conservative has still managed to retain the seat.

West Derbyshire by-election, 1962
Party	Candidate	Votes	%	±%
Conservative	Aidan Crawley	12,455	36.0	−25.3
Liberal	Ronald Gardner-Thorpe	11,235	32.5	New
Labour	John Dilks	9,431	27.2	−11.5
Independent	Raymond Gregory	1,433	4.1	New
Majority		1,220	3.5	−19.1
Turnout		34,554		
Conservative hold		Swing		

== Previous election ==
General election 1959: West Derbyshire
Party	Candidate	Votes	%	±%
Conservative	Edward Wakefield	22,034	61.3	+1.7
Labour	Albert E. Kitts	13,925	38.7	−1.7
Majority		8,109	22.6	+3.4
Turnout		35,959	82.0	+2.0
Conservative hold		Swing		
