= Patrick Moynihan, 2nd Baron Moynihan =

British politician and peer

The Right Honourable The Lord Moynihan
- Baron Moynihan
- Tenure: 1936–1965
- Predecessor: Berkeley Moynihan, 1st Baron Moynihan
- Successor: Antony Moynihan, 3rd Baron Moynihan
- Born: Patrick Berkeley Moynihan; 29 July 1906
- Died: 30 April 1965 (aged 58)
- Parents: Berkeley Moynihan; Isabella Jessop

Member of the House of Lords Lord Temporal
- In office 7 September 1936 – 30 April 1965; Hereditary Peerage
- Preceded by: Berkeley Moynihan
- Succeeded by: Antony Moynihan

Patrick Berkeley Moynihan, 2nd Baron Moynihan (29 July 1906 – 30 April 1965) was a British politician and peer.

== Early life ==
Moynihan was born in Leeds in 1906, the only son of the surgeon Berkeley Moynihan, 1st Baron Moynihan. He studied law and became a barrister at Lincoln's Inn. He then became a stockbroker, moving to New York City, where he was active during the Wall Street crash, then joined the New York Stock Exchange in 1932. He succeeded his father as 2nd Baron Moynihan in 1936.

== Liberal Politics ==
Moynihan followed his father in taking the Liberal Party whip in the House of Lords. By 1947, he was the treasurer of the party, and commented that he believed that the Labour Party's social reforms were close to the spirit of the Liberals, but that they ignored the individual. In 1949, he became the party chairman. His time as chairman was dominated by the 1950 general election, and a dispute with the Conservative Party, who ran National Liberal Party candidates under the label "Liberal and Conservative".

In February 1950, an object hit Moynihan's car while he was driving in Epping Forest. He claimed that it might have been a bullet, although he was unable to prove this.

In 1950 and 1951, Moynihan served as President of the National Union of Liberal Clubs, and he again became the party treasurer.

Long a friend of Edward Martell, in 1956 Moynihan was a founder member of his People's League for the Defence of Freedom, which claimed to combat the "tyranny of trade unions". The new organisation was opposed by the Executive of the Liberal Party, which was concerned that it was contemplating standing rival political candidates, and also opposed its calls for strikebreaking. The People's League became the National Fellowship, which opposed immigration and entry to the Common Market. Because of his support for the new organisation, in 1962, Moynihan was removed as a vice-president of the Yorkshire Area Liberal Federation. In 1963, Moynihan resigned from the Liberal Party, citing his membership of Martell's latest organisation, the Freedom Group, which actively supported Conservative candidates. However, in 1964, he began disassociating himself from Martell, resigning his posts in Martell's organisations by early 1965.

== Marriages & Children ==
Lord Moynihan married firstly Ierne Helen Candy on 8 April 1931. They had the following children:

- Hon Imogen Anne Ierne Moynihan (born 12 April 1932), married firstly Michael Edward Peter Williams (son of Wg Cdr Gwyn Herschell Jones Williams) on 3 September 1953, later divorced. She married, secondly, Charles Ivan Vance on 23 April 1965.
- Hon Juliet Jane Margaretta Moynihan (born 18 April 1934, died 24 September 2006), married firstly Thomas Edwin Bidwell Abraham (son of Maj Gen William Ernest Victor Abraham) on 25 July 1958. She married secondly Harry Hougham Sparks in 1978.
- Antony Patrick Andrew Cairnes Berkeley Moynihan, 3rd Baron Moynihan (born 2 February 1936, died 24 November 1991)

They were divorced in 1952 and Lord Moynihan subsequently married June Elizabeth Hopkins on 28 November 1952. They had the following children:

- Colin Berkeley Moynihan, 4th Baron Moynihan (born 13 September 1955)
- Hon Melanie June Moynihan (born 19 August 1957)

== Death ==
In April 1965, Lord Moynihan was charged with "persistently importuning for an immoral purpose". He was taken ill and died aged 58 on 30 April, a few days before he was due to appear at Bow Street Magistrates' Court. He was succeeded in the barony and baronetcy by his elder son Antony.

== Arms ==
Coat of arms of Patrick Moynihan, 2nd Baron Moynihan
| Crest A demi-knights in armour affrontee resting the sinister hand on the hip Proper and supporting with the dexter hand a spear also Proper flowing therefrom a forked pennon Argent charged with a Maltese Cross Sable. Escutcheon Azure a chevron between in chief three mullets Argent and in base a rose also Argent barbed and seeded Proper. Supporters On either side an owl Argent gorged with a baron's coronet Or. Motto Spiandact Tapeir Neill (Sunshine After Rain) |

Party political offices
| Preceded by Philip Fothergill | Chairman of the Liberal Party; 1949–1950 | Succeeded by Frank Byers |
| Preceded by Philip Rea | Treasurer of the Liberal Party; 1947–1953; With: Wulff Henry Grey (1950–1953); The Viscount Wimborne (1950–1952) | Succeeded by The Lord Grantchester |
Peerage of the United Kingdom
| Preceded by Berkeley Moynihan | Baron Moynihan; 1936–1965 | Succeeded by Antony Moynihan |
