= Colin Moynihan, 4th Baron Moynihan =

British politician and rower

The Right Honourable The Lord Moynihan
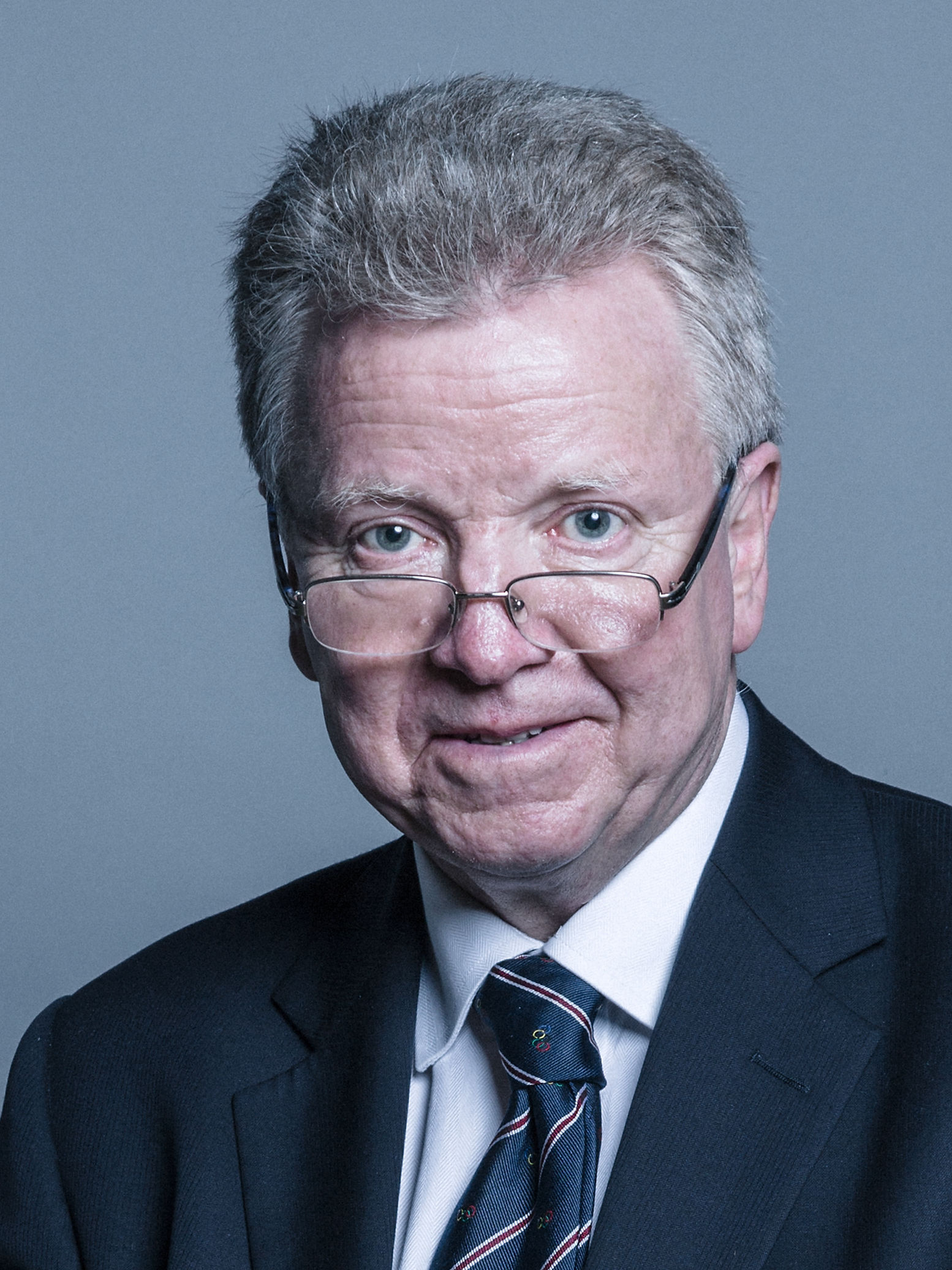
- Official portrait, 2018

Shadow Minister for Business, Innovation, Science and Trade and Digital, Culture, Media and Sport
- Incumbent
- Assumed office 17 September 2026
- Leader: Kemi Badenoch

Shadow Minister for Energy Security and Net Zero
- In office 4 June 2026 – 16 September 2026
- Leader: Kemi Badenoch
- Preceded by: The Lord Offord of Garvel
- Succeeded by: The Lord Blencathra

Chairman of the British Olympic Association
- In office 5 October 2005 – 7 November 2012
- Preceded by: Craig Reedie
- Succeeded by: The Lord Coe

Parliamentary Under-Secretary of State for Sport
- In office 22 June 1987 – 26 July 1990
- Prime Minister: Margaret Thatcher
- Preceded by: Richard Tracey
- Succeeded by: Robert Atkins

Member of the House of Lords Lord Temporal
- Incumbent
- Life peerage 4 June 2026
- Elected Hereditary Peer; 11 November 1999 – 29 April 2026
- Election: 1999
- Preceded by: Seat established
- Succeeded by: Seat abolished
- Hereditary peerage 30 April 1997 – 11 November 1999
- Preceded by: The 3rd Baron Moynihan (1991)
- Succeeded by: Seat abolished

Member of Parliament for Lewisham East
- In office 9 June 1983 – 16 March 1992
- Preceded by: Roland Moyle
- Succeeded by: Bridget Prentice

Personal details
- Born: 13 September 1955 (age 71) Surrey, England
- Party: Conservative
- Spouse: Gaynor-Louise Metcalf (m. 1992; div. 2016)
- Children: 3
- Education: University College, Oxford
- Occupation: Company Director
- Profession: Sports administrator, businessman

Medal record

Men's rowing

Representing Great Britain

Olympic Games
Silver medal – second place	1980 Moscow	Eight

World Championships
Gold medal – first place	1978 Copenhagen	Lwt eight
Silver medal – second place	1981 Munich	Eight

Colin Berkeley Moynihan, 4th Baron Moynihan, Baron Moynihan of Purbeck (born 13 September 1955), is a British Olympic silver medalist, politician, businessman and sports administrator. Lord Moynihan served as the Chairman of the British Olympic Association (BOA) from 2005 to 2012. A member of the Conservative Party, he was as a Member of Parliament (MP) representing the constituency of Lewisham East from 1983 to 1992, and was the Minister for Sport from 1987 to 1990. He has been a member of the House of Lords since 1997.

In May 2026, it was announced that Moynihan was to be given one of 26 new life peerages, returning him to the House of Lords after the coming into force of the House of Lords (Hereditary Peers) Act 2026.

== Biography ==
=== Early life ===
Moynihan is the son of Patrick Moynihan, 2nd Baron Moynihan, by his second wife June Elizabeth Hopkins, daughter of Arthur Stanley Covacic Hopkins. He was educated in the state system, including at secondary level, but studied at Monmouth School with a Music Scholarship from 1968 to 1973.

In 1974 he went to University College, Oxford, graduating in 1977 with a BA in Politics, Philosophy and Economics (proceeding MA in 1982). He was a "double blue" coxing the victorious Oxford University crew in the 1977 Oxford and Cambridge Boat Race and boxing against Cambridge in the Bantamweight division. He beat Benazir Bhutto in the election for the Presidency of the Oxford Union in 1976 and won the Trans-Atlantic Universities Debating Competition the same year. In 1977, he was awarded the Fiddian Post-Graduate Research Scholarship in Politics at Brasenose College, Oxford, which he did not take up in favour of working at the Westburn sugar refinery in Greenock for Tate & Lyle.

In 2007, he was awarded an Honorary Doctor of Philosophy by the London Metropolitan University.

=== Sport and the Olympics ===
In 1968 he won a gold medal in the Home Countries International Regatta, coxing the Welsh Senior Rowing IV. He was selected to tour the United States in 1973 as a member of the British Swifts Golf Team.

In 1978 Moynihan won a gold medal coxing the British Lightweight VIII at the 1978 FISA Lightweight Championships held in Copenhagen. In the 1980 Summer Olympics in Moscow, he ignored pressure to boycott for political reasons. He was cox for the Great Britain men's rowing VIII winning a silver medal; during the race, the steering cables to the rudder broke and Moynihan had to reach behind him to grasp the rudder bar. In this unorthodox manner, he steered the boat for most of the race. Most of the crew did not realise what had happened until after the race was over. In the 1981 Munich World Championships he coxed the British VIII to silver medal success.

Since 1978 he has, at different times, been a trustee of the Sports Aid Foundation, governor of the Sports Aid Trust, member of the Sports Council, member of the Central Council for Physical Recreation's Enquiry into Sponsorship of Sport, a trustee of the Oxford University Boat Club, member of the Major Spectator Sports Committee of the Central Council for Physical Recreation, a Steward of the British Boxing Board of Control, patron of the Bath University Amateur Boxing Club, patron of the Uphill Ski Club, president of the British Biathlon Union, president of the Welsh Amateur Rowing Association and chairman of the Paralympic World Cup in 2005. As a celebrated former University College Boat Club (Oxford) cox, he was invited to open the new University College Boathouse in Oxford in 2007.

=== Political career ===
Following his appointment in 1981 as one of Whitehall's earliest Political Advisers (working in the Foreign Office for Francis Pym, then Foreign Secretary), Moynihan was elected in 1983 as the Conservative Member of Parliament for Lewisham East. After chairing the World Youth Summit in Hiroshima and being an Official Commonwealth Observer at the Kenyan elections he became Parliamentary Private Secretary to Kenneth Clarke in a number of Departments. From 1987 to 1990 he served as Minister for Sport in Margaret Thatcher's government. He was in this post at the time of the 1989 Hillsborough disaster in which 96 football fans were killed, and visited the scene with Margaret Thatcher to meet with senior South Yorkshire police officers on the day of the tragedy.

Moynihan was at the centre of a government proposal to bring in an ID Card scheme for supporters of English Football League teams in the wake of repeated outbreaks of hooliganism in the late 1980s. However, these plans had to be abandoned following the Hillsborough disaster and the subsequent Taylor Report, but he eventually piloted the Football Spectators Bill through Parliament to address football hooliganism which included the introduction of CCTV cameras in all 92 League Grounds and a range of other measures to tackle hooliganism.

From 1987 to 1990, Moynihan was Parliamentary Under Secretary of State at the Department of the Environment responsible for water privatisation, National Heritage, the National Rivers Authority, Inner City policy, planning and urban regeneration. During his time at the Department of the Environment he worked closely with Michael Howard who, when subsequently Leader of the Conservative Party, appointed Moynihan as his special adviser and chairman of the Conservative Campaigning Board. From 1990 to 1992 he was joint-Parliamentary Under-Secretary of State for Energy in both the Thatcher and Major governments responsible for oil, gas and renewable energy policy, a field in which he took a leading interest through the establishment of the first Government UK Renewable Energy Advisory Group which he chaired and the introduction of the first Non Fossil Fuel Obligation in Parliament which initiated Government support for renewable energy. During his time in the House of Commons, he chaired the All Party Parliamentary Group on Afghanistan, was Hon. Secretary of the Conservative Foreign Affairs Committee, the Parliamentary British Latin America Group and the Parliamentary Friends of the British Council. Whilst Moynihan's House of Commons seat was lost to Labour's Bridget Prentice in the General Election of 1992, his half-brother's death in 1991 opened the door to him for continuing his political career in the House of Lords, but he did not officially succeed to the title until 1997.

From 1997 to 2000, Moynihan was a Shadow Senior Front Bench Foreign Affairs Spokesman for the Conservative Party and was elected as one of the hereditary peers to remain in the Upper House following the House of Lords Act 1999. He was Shadow Minister for Minister for Sport in the House of Lords from July 2003 to February 2005.

In response to tabloid newspaper headlines about supposed English football hooliganism at the 1990 FIFA World Cup in Italy, Moynihan cooperated with Italian police, sending British police to escort English fans back to the UK. It transpired a plane was chartered ahead of any arrests, with the number of those subsequently arrested equating to the available seats available. Moynihan was removed from his post by Prime Minister Margaret Thatcher during Parliament's summer recess.

=== Business career ===
Moynihan started his business career working consecutively in Glasgow, Liverpool and the London docks with Tate & Lyle. He remained with the company for 10 years with his last assignment being chief executive of Ridgways Tea & Coffee Merchants. After 10 years in Parliament, Moynihan returned to the business world as executive chairman and chief executive of Consort Resources Ltd and then director of Clipper Windpower plc and executive chairman of Clipper Windpower Europe Ltd. He has held a series of non-executive directorships including at Ranger Oil and Rowan Companies. From 2005 to 2011 he was chairman of Pelamis Wave Power Ltd in Edinburgh. He was a non-executive director of Rowan Companies, where he chaired Rowan's Health, Safety and Environment Committee. He was chairman of the clean energy company, Hydrodec Group plc from 2012 to 2019. He is currently chairman and partner of the private equity group, Buckthorn Capital LLP. In January 2023, Amey named Moynihan as its new chair.

A Freeman of the City of London, he was later admitted as a Liveryman of the Haberdashers' Company in 1981 becoming a member of the Haberdashers' Court of Assistants in 2002, Third Warden from 2013 to 2014, chaired the Haberdashers' Education Foundation and was a member of the Haberdashers' Company Finance Committee. In 2022, Lord Moynihan became the Chair of Governors at Haberdashers' Monmouth Schools.

=== Peerage ===
The House of Lords declared the Moynihan Barony dormant on the death of Moynihan's older half-brother, Antony Moynihan in 1991. Colin Moynihan spent five years engaged in the complex claim to the title due to the number of the 3rd Baron's marriages and questions over the parentage and legitimacy of his sons. In 1997 the Committee for Privileges adjudicated:

...that neither of the two sons purporting to be the sons of the Third Baron can, in fact, be an heir to the peerage. In the case of the elder, Andrew, the committee was shown overwhelming genetic evidence that he cannot be the son of the late Lord Moynihan; and so far as the younger, Daniel, is concerned, the evidence clearly shows that he is the child of a bigamous marriage and is therefore illegitimate. In those circumstances, it is clear beyond doubt that the petitioner, Colin Moynihan, must be the rightful heir and that his Petitions must succeed.

A writ of summons was issued on 30 April 1997 confirming Colin Moynihan in the title of Baron Moynihan.

Lord Moynihan also succeeded as a baronet, a title granted to the first holder in 1922.

Moynihan was removed from the House of Lords in April 2026 as part of the House of Lords (Hereditary Peers) Act 2026, but was returned to the House as a life peer when he was created as Baron Moynihan of Purbeck, of Leeds in the County of York on 4 June 2026.

=== British Olympic Association ===
On 5 October 2005, Moynihan was elected chairman of the British Olympic Association (BOA), for the run-up to the 2012 London Olympic Games. He beat the 1968 Olympic hurdles champion, David Hemery, by a vote of 28 to 15. He was re-elected unopposed in 2008.

He has served on a number of committees and commissions for the International Olympic Committee including the IOC International Relations Commission, the IOC 2009 Congress Editorial Committee and as an executive board member of the Association of National Olympic Committees from 2006 to 2011. He was elected to the European Olympic Committee Executive Board in 2009. In the context of the London 2012 Olympic Games, Lord Moynihan was a director of the London Organising Committee of the Olympic and Paralympic Games (LOCOG), where he also served on the LOCOG Audit Committee; a trustee of International Inspiration and a member of the Olympic Board, which had oversight of the London 2012 Games.

==== Chairmanship controversy and resignation ====
In March 2011, it was reported that Moynihan's future as BOA chairman seemed in doubt, because of a dispute with the organisers of the London 2012 Olympics which revolved around the funding of the Paralympics. Moynihan led the BOA in challenging a "clear cut" International Olympic Committee rule that shares of any profit from the 2012 Games must take into account the costs of Paralympic games. His costly pursuit of this legal action was considered deeply embarrassing to BOA's National Olympic Committee members. In April 2011 the dispute with the London Organising Committee who were supported by the International Olympic Committee was resolved with the BOA, when the latter backed down from its demands. In April 2011 the dispute with the London Organising Committee who were supported by the International Olympic Committee was resolved with the BOA.

During the 2012 Summer Olympics in London, Lord Moynihan issued a rallying cry for British state schools to do more to foster sport.

The day after the closing ceremony, Lord Moynihan resigned, quipping, "I notice politicians have enjoyed these Games – I understand why Roman Emperors were in favour of annual Games!"

Moynihan was awarded the Olympic Order by the president of the International Olympic Committee at the completion of the London Summer Games.

=== Personal life ===
Lord Moynihan married Gaynor-Louise Metcalf in 1992, the marriage was dissolved in 2016. They have two sons and a daughter:

- Hon. Nicholas Ewen Berkeley Moynihan (born 31 March 1994)
- Hon. George Edward Berkeley Moynihan (born 4 June 1995)
- Hon. India Isabella Sarah Moynihan (born 2 September 1997)

== Artistic recognition ==
Lord Moynihan formed part of the "Living Legends" art exhibition of 2014, with his head being body-cast by sculptor Louise Giblin (cast in 2012).

== Arms ==
Coat of arms of Colin Moynihan, 4th Baron Moynihan
Crest A demi-knights in armour affrontee resting the sinister hand on the hip Proper and supporting with the dexter hand a spear also Proper flowing therefrom a forked pennon Argent charged with a Maltese Cross Sable. Escutcheon Azure a chevron between in chief three mullets Argent and in base a rose also Argent barbed and seeded Proper. Supporters On either side an owl Argent gorged with a baron's coronet Or. Motto Spiandact Tapeir Neill (Sunshine After Rain)

Parliament of the United Kingdom
Preceded by Roland Moyle	Member of Parliament for Lewisham East; 1983–1992	Succeeded by Bridget Prentice
New office created by the House of Lords Act 1999	Elected hereditary peer to the House of Lords under the House of Lords Act 1999; 1999–2026	Office abolished under the House of Lords (Hereditary Peers) Act 2026
Political offices
Preceded by Richard Tracey	Minister for Sport; 1987–1990	Succeeded by Robert Atkins
Preceded by Tony Baldry	Parliamentary Under-Secretary of State for Energy; 1990–1992; With: Tony Baldry July–November 1990; David Heathcoat-Amory 1990–1992	Succeeded by Timothy Eggar (as Minister of State for Energy and Industry)
Sporting positions
Preceded by Craig Reedie	Chairman of the British Olympic Association; 2005–2012	Succeeded by The Lord Coe
Peerage of the United Kingdom
Preceded by Antony Moynihan	Baron Moynihan^{1} 1991–present Member of the House of Lords (1997–1999)	Incumbent; Heir apparent: Hon. Nicholas Moynihan
Notes and references
1. Moynihan's claim to the title was not proved until 1997.
