= Andrew Moynihan =

Recipient of the Victoria Cross

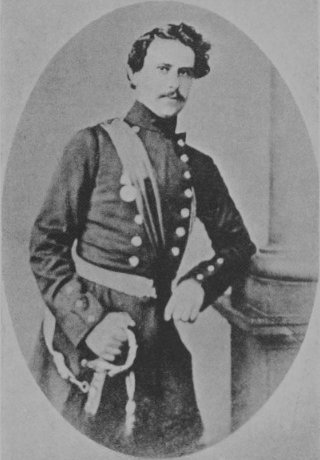
- Born: 1 January 1830; Wakefield, West Yorkshire, England
- Died: 18 May 1867 (aged 37); Malta
- Burial place: Ta' Braxia Cemetery, Malta
- Relatives: Berkeley Moynihan, 1st Baron Moynihan (son)
- Military career
- Allegiance: United Kingdom
- Branch: British Army
- Rank: Captain
- Units: 90th Regiment of Foot; 8th Regiment of Foot
- Conflicts: Crimean War; Indian Mutiny
- Awards: Victoria Cross; Médaille militaire (France)

Andrew Moynihan, VC (1 January 1830 – 18 May 1867) was an English recipient of the Victoria Cross, the highest and most prestigious award for gallantry in the face of the enemy that can be awarded to British and Commonwealth forces.

== Background ==
He was born in the Saw Yard, Wakefield, Yorkshire on 1 January 1830, the son of Malachi and Ann (née Scott) and was baptised at the Catholic Church of St Austin in Wakefield on 14 March 1830. Andrew Moynihan married Ellen Anne (née Parkin) in 1853 in Ashton under Lyne, Lancashire. The widowed Ellen Moynihan returned to Yorkshire after the death of her husband and settled in Leeds where she raised her son and two daughters.

== Military career ==
Moynihan joined the British Army aged 17. He was a 25-year-old sergeant in the 90th Foot, British Army during the Crimean War when his gallant action took place on 8 September 1855 at Sebastopol. Sergeant Moynihan, who was with the storming party at the assault on the Redan in the Crimea, personally encountered and killed five Russians, and while under heavy fire also rescued a wounded officer from near the Redan.

Moynihan served in India during the Indian Rebellion of 1857 and in the Oudh Campaign of 1858–59. He was promoted to sergeant major and in 1856 was commissioned into the 8th (The King's) Regiment of Foot. He was promoted lieutenant the following year and captain in 1863. Captain Moynihan disembarked with the 1st Battalion the 8th Regiment of Foot in Malta from Kingstown, Ireland on 20 Mar 1866; he would die on the island a little over a year later.

His Victoria Cross is displayed at the Cameronians Regimental Museum in Hamilton, Lanarkshire, Scotland.

== Death ==
He died in Floriana after contracting Malta Fever, caused by drinking unsterilised goat's milk. He is buried in Ta' Braxia Cemetery, near Valletta.

== Notable Relatives ==
His son became a prominent surgeon being raised to the peerage as Berkeley Moynihan, 1st Baron Moynihan.

== See also ==
- Profile
- Andrew Moynihan, VC (Henry L. Kirby, 1993)
- Irish Winners of the Victoria Cross (Richard Doherty & David Truesdale, 2000)
- Monuments to Courage (David Harvey, 1999)
- The Register of the Victoria Cross (This England, 1997)
