= Heather Harvey =

Heather Harvey

Heather Joan Harvey CBE (September 1899 – 1989), was a British writer and Liberal Party politician.

== Background ==
Harvey was educated privately at Prior's Field School, Godalming, and Newnham College, Cambridge, where she graduated in 1921 with first-class honours, economics tripos. In 1973 she was appointed a CBE for political services in the Queen's Birthday Honours.

== Professional career ==
Harvey joined the Royal Institute of International Affairs, Chatham House, in 1931. She became secretary of the Study Groups Department in 1935. She was a temporary Civil servant in the Foreign Office, 1939–45. She served with the United Nations 1945–46 as deputy administrative secretary. She was a writer and was engaged in historical research.

== Political career ==
Harvey was Honorary Treasurer of the Women's Liberal Federation, a member of the Liberal Party Organisation Council and the executive committee. She was Joint Honorary Treasurer of the Liberal Party.

=== Electoral record ===
General Election 1950: Esher
Party	Candidate	Votes	%	±%
Conservative	William Robson Brown	33,094	60.7	n/a
Labour	Ethel Chipchase	15,514	28.6	n/a
Liberal	Heather Harvey	5,704	10.5	n/a
Majority		17,580	32.4	n/a
Turnout				n/a
Conservative win				

General Election 1951: Esher
Party	Candidate	Votes	%	±%
Conservative	William Robson Brown	33,755	62.9	
Labour	Percy McNally	15,334	28.6	
Liberal	Heather Harvey	4,612	8.4	
Majority		18,421	34.3	
Turnout			83.4	
Conservative hold		Swing		

General Election 1955: Southend West
Party	Candidate	Votes	%	±%
Conservative	Henry Channon	27,326	64.2	−4.9
Labour	Victor Marchesi	8,866	20.8	−10.1
Liberal	Heather Harvey	6,375	15.0	n/a
Majority		18,460	43.4	+5.1
Turnout			74.1	−4.9
Conservative hold		Swing		

1959 Southend West by-election
Party	Candidate	Votes	%	±%
Conservative	Paul Channon	14,493	55.6	−8.6
Liberal	Heather Harvey	6,314	24.2	+9.2
Labour	Anthony Pearson-Clarke	5,280	20.2	−0.6
Majority		8,179	31.4	−12.0
Turnout				
Conservative hold		Swing	-6.0	

General Election 1959: Southend West
Party	Candidate	Votes	%	±%
Conservative	Paul Channon	27,612	58.2	+2.6
Liberal	Heather Harvey	10,577	22.3	−1.9
Labour	Anthony Pearson-Clarke	9,219	19.4	−0.8
Majority		17,035	35.9	+4.5
Turnout			77.7	
Conservative hold		Swing		

Party political offices
Preceded by Philip Fothergill; Baron Grantchester	Treasurer of the Liberal Party; 1959–1962; With: Baron Grantchester; Patrick Lort-Phillips (1959–1960); J. C. McLaughlin (1961–1962)	Succeeded by Ronald Gardner-Thorpe; Andrew Murray
