= Berkeley Moynihan, 1st Baron Moynihan =

British surgeon (1865–1936)

The Right Honourable The Lord Moynihan KCMG CB FRCS
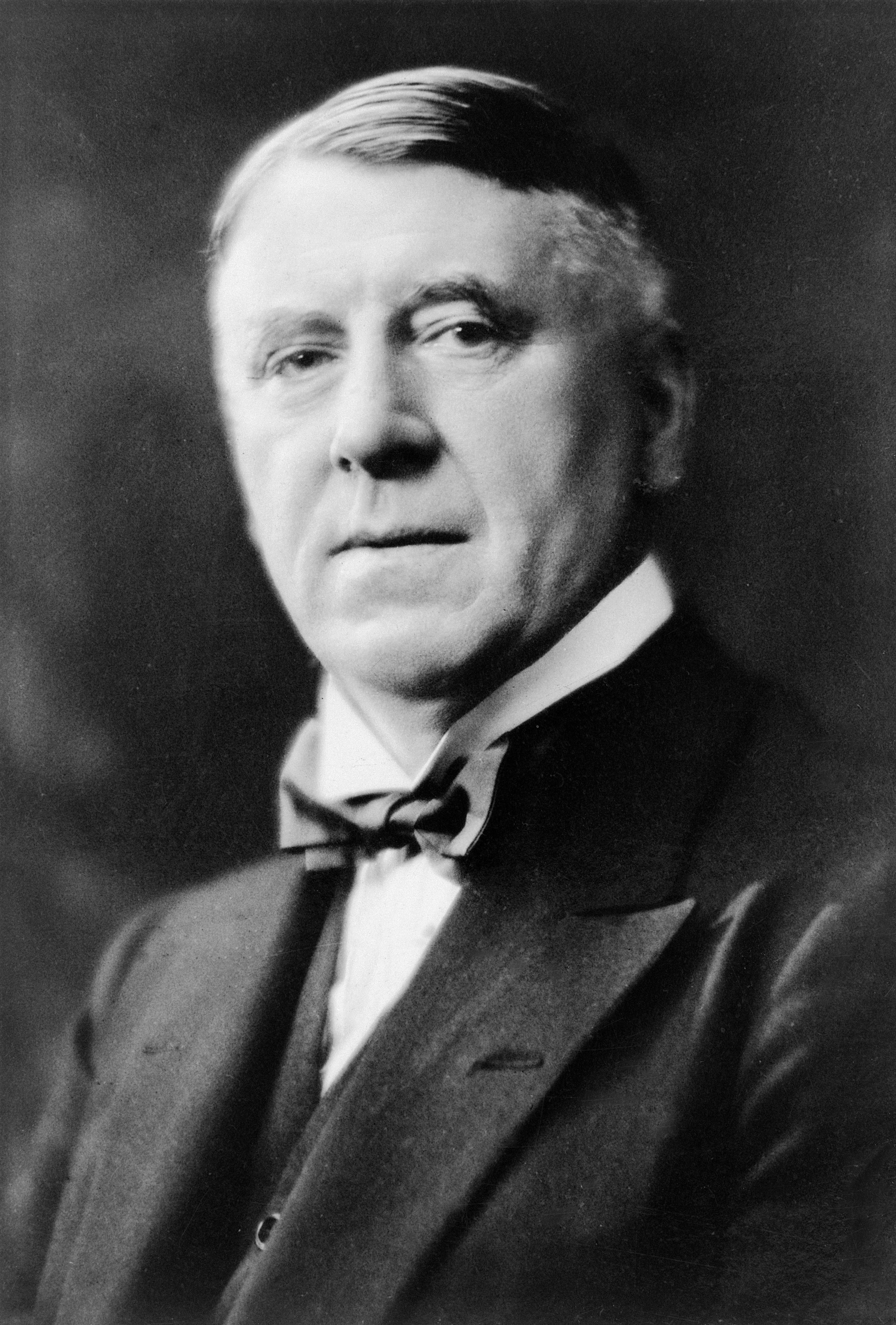
- Tenure: 1929–1936
- Successor: Patrick Moynihan, 2nd Baron Moynihan
- Born: Berkeley George Andrew Moynihan; 2 September 1865
- Died: 7 September 1936 (aged 71)
- Education: Leeds School of Medicine

Member of the House of Lords Lord Temporal
- In office 19 March 1929 – 7 September 1936; Hereditary Peerage
- Succeeded by: Patrick Moynihan

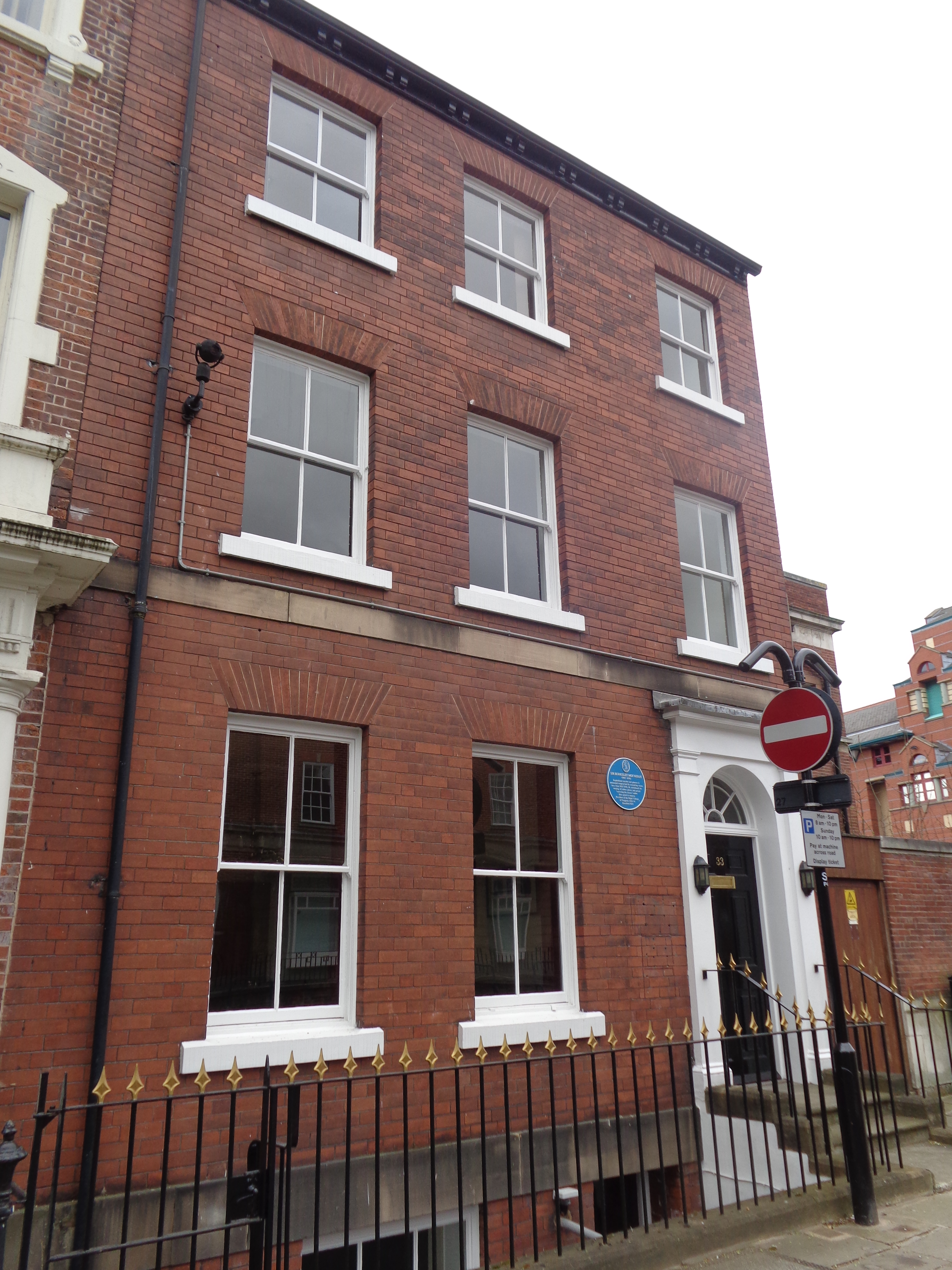
Moynihan's former surgery on Park Square, Leeds.

Berkeley George Andrew Moynihan, 1st Baron Moynihan, KCMG, CB, FRCS (2 October 1865 – 7 September 1936), known as Sir Berkeley Moynihan, 1st Baronet from 1922 to 1929, was a noted British abdominal surgeon.

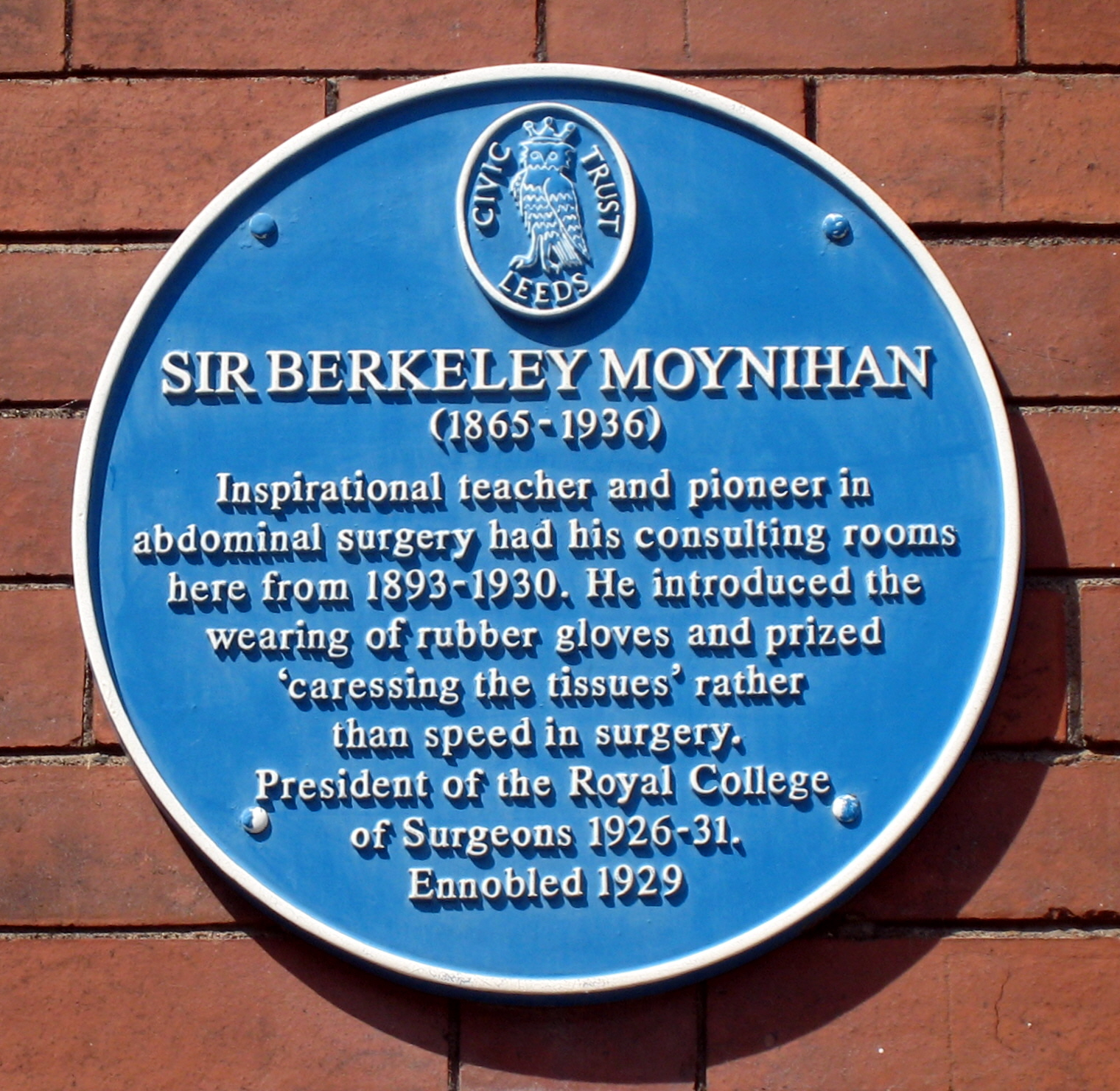
Sir Berkeley Moynihan blue plaque 2018

== Early years ==
Moynihan was born in Malta in 1865, the son of Captain Andrew Moynihan, VC. His father died in 1867 and Moynihan moved with his mother to Leeds, Yorkshire. He was educated in Leeds and the Christ's Hospital, Newgate, London (1875–1881).

== Medical career ==
After two years at the Royal Naval School, Eltham, he returned to Leeds to study medicine at the Leeds School of Medicine. He graduated MB BS at the University of London in 1887 and joined Leeds General Infirmary as a house surgeon. He was then successively demonstrator of anatomy in the Medical School (1893–96), assistant surgeon to the infirmary (1896), surgeon from 1906 and consulting surgeon from 1927 until his death.

In parallel with his appointment as a surgeon, Moynihan was a lecturer in surgery from 1896 to 1909, and from 1910 to 1927 Professor of Clinical Surgery (from 1925 Surgery) at the University of Leeds.

By the end of the Great War Moynihan held the rank of major-general in the British Army and had been chairman of the Army Advisory Board from 1916 and chairman of the council of consultants 1916 to 1919.

He delivered the Bradshaw Lecture in 1920 and the Hunterian oration in 1927. He served as President of the Royal College of Surgeons of England from 1926 to 1932.

In 1935, a year before his death, Moynihan and Dr Killick Millard had founded the British Voluntary Euthanasia Society.

Moynihan's surgery on Park Square, Leeds in the city centre still stands, now used as private offices. Their former use and connection to Moynihan is marked with a Leeds Civic Society blue plaque.

== Honours ==
Moynihan was knighted in 1912, appointed a Companion of the Order of the Bath (CB) in 1917, a Knight Commander of the Order of St Michael & St George (KCMG) in 1918 and created a Baronet of Carr Manor in 1922. On 19 March 1929 he was raised to the peerage as Baron Moynihan, of Leeds in the County of York.

There is a lecture theatre/conference space at Thackray Medical Museum, Leeds, named the "Moynihan Auditorium".

== Family ==
Moynihan married Isabella Wellesley Jessop, the daughter of prominent Leeds surgeon Thomas Jessop, on 17 April 1895. They had three children:

- Hon Dorothy Wellesley Moynihan (born 1897)
- Hon Shelagh Berkeley Moynihan (born 1902), married Henry Wynn Parry, BCh in 1923
- Patrick Berkeley Moynihan, 2nd Baron Moynihan (born 29 July 1906, died 30 April 1965)

Lady Moynihan died on 1 September 1936. Lord Moynihan died six days later at the age of 70 and was succeeded in the barony and baronetcy by his only son Patrick.

== Arms ==
Coat of arms of Berkeley Moynihan, 1st Baron Moynihan
Crest A demi-knights in armour affrontee resting the sinister hand on the hip Proper and supporting with the dexter hand a spear also Proper flowing therefrom a forked pennon Argent charged with a Maltese Cross Sable. Escutcheon Azure a chevron between in chief three mullets Argent and in base a rose also Argent barbed and seeded Proper. Supporters On either side an owl Argent gorged with a baron's coronet Or. Motto Spiandact Tapeir Neill (Sunshine After Rain)

Peerage of the United Kingdom
New creation	Baron Moynihan; 1929–1936	Succeeded by Patrick Berkeley Moynihan
Baronetage of the United Kingdom
New creation	Baronet (of Carr Manor); 1922–1936	Succeeded by Patrick Moynihan
