= Carr Manor =

Victorian house in Leeds, England

Coordinates: 53.8364°N 1.5538°W

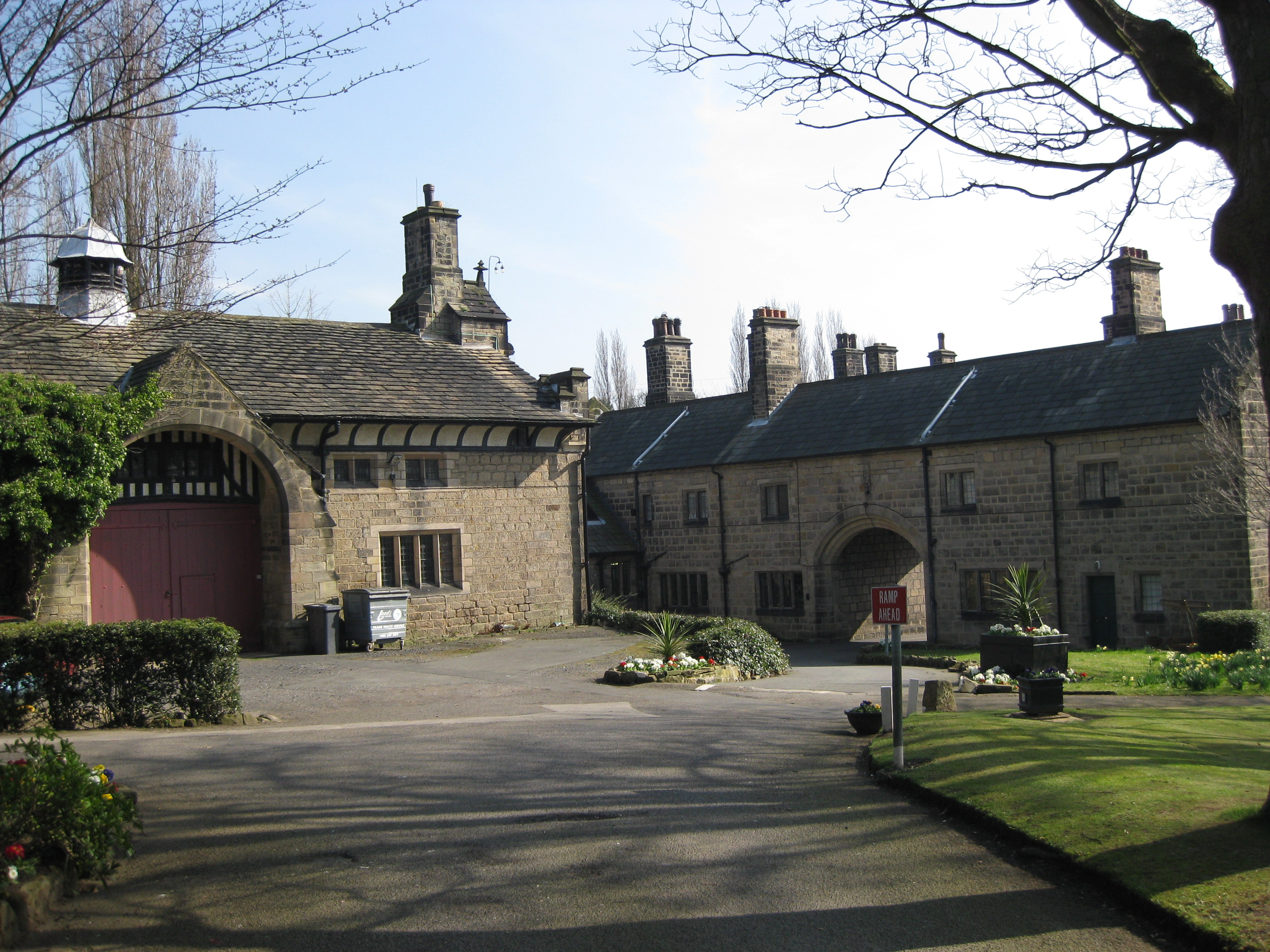
Carr Manor, Stonegate Road, stable block on left

Carr Manor is a Victorian grade II listed house in Meanwood, Leeds, England, designed by Edward Schroeder Prior and built for Thomas Clifford Allbutt (1836–1925). In 1881 it replaced Carr Manor House, though retaining the 1796 stable block. The former gardener's and housekeeper's cottages, the former stables (now garage) and the wall, gate piers and gates are also grade II listed.

It was Richard Norman Shaw’s custom to give setting up commissions to his former pupils. Carr Manor was Edward Schroeder Prior's setting up commission on his departure in 1880. The house shows more of influence from Philip Webb than from Shaw. It follows the local vernacular of strong stone built manor houses of the 17th century.

== Architecture ==
The influence of Shaw is recognisable. In particular, Shaw's houses at Flete House (1877–83) and Adcote (1875—80) were influential. Prior adopted Shaw's entrance hall scheme, rather than the vernacular screens passage that is characteristic of Yorkshire manor houses. The west side includes black and white work, reminiscent of Shaw. A Flemish influence is also apparent in the crow stepped gables of the east and west front. The local vernacular is also clearly an influence with stepped label mouldings, stepped windows and parapets. The window glass is based on 16th and 17th century patterns and as a prelude to Prior's later extensive use of stained glass there is stained glass on pastel colours and geometric designs in the windows of the upper floors.

Despite the restrictions on planning imposed by the existing layout, Carr Manor demonstrates Prior's concern to link the building to its garden. The house turns its back on the road looking south over the garden, which he planned in conjunction with the house.

Prior's work at Carr Manor completely integrated the existing 17th century manor into the new house. He added the library, conservatory room, drawing room and dining room. The auxiliary buildings were reworked from the 18th century facilities. The relationship between the main block and the service accommodation was defined by the plan of the existing building, rather than designed as a response to site, unlike most of Prior's later buildings.

The main facade has three gabled bays with a further gable on the east side of the protruding library. Two further gables on the east front unify the house design. The extensive and varied windows emphasise the horizontal nature of the elevations.

The entrance hall was perpendicular to the double height main hall. The interior was decorated in a neo-Jacobean scheme with an oak gallery with wooden segmental arches with turned balusters. The hall divides the house along a north–south axis.

The interior reflects Prior's belief in the integration of architecture and furniture. Prior designed wardrobes, and cupboards in the gallery and dining room, and settles. The floors were bare wood with oriental carpets. The dining room ceiling was richly decorated in plaster work.

Prior's interested in materials and craftsmanship were well established by the time he came to design Carr Manor. The house is built of local grey Horsforth Stone with grey Pool Bank stone for the dressings and a heavy grey slated roof. Local specialists, J. Mattack of Keighley undertook the stonework.

== Later history ==
Allbutt, a vicar's son from Yorkshire, invented the short clinical thermometer and ophthalmoscope and published his influential eight-volume System of Medicine between 1896 and 1899. He was also supposedly the model of Tertius Lydgate M.D. in George Eliot's Middlemarch. Allbutt was typical of Prior's future clients: successful professional middle-class men, solicitors, barristers, doctors etc.

In 1903 the Leeds firm of Bedford and Kiston were engaged to make major alterations to the house, doubling its size through the addition of a northern range and adding two stories to Prior's service wing, creating an E-shaped plan. They added two west bays to the garden front and altered the terrace. Their work carefully imitated that of Prior externally, but the interiors have been extensively altered with the repositioning of the entrance, hall and main staircase and the classification of the dining room.

In 1914 Carr Manor was bought by the renowned Leeds-based surgeon, Sir Berkeley Moynihan, later the first Lord Moynihan. He lived there until his death in 1936. The house is now used by the Ministry of Justice as the Judges' Lodgings, housing High Court Judges when they come to Leeds to conduct trials.

The property as currently set out (October 2025) extends to over 17,528 sq ft (1,628.4 m^{2}), while the grounds cover 10.1 acres.

== See also ==
- Bateman, D., "Berkeley Moynihan Surgeon" (1940)
