= Alfred Suenson-Taylor, 1st Baron Grantchester =

British banker and politician (1893–1976)

The Right Honourable The Lord Grantchester OBE FRGS FRSA
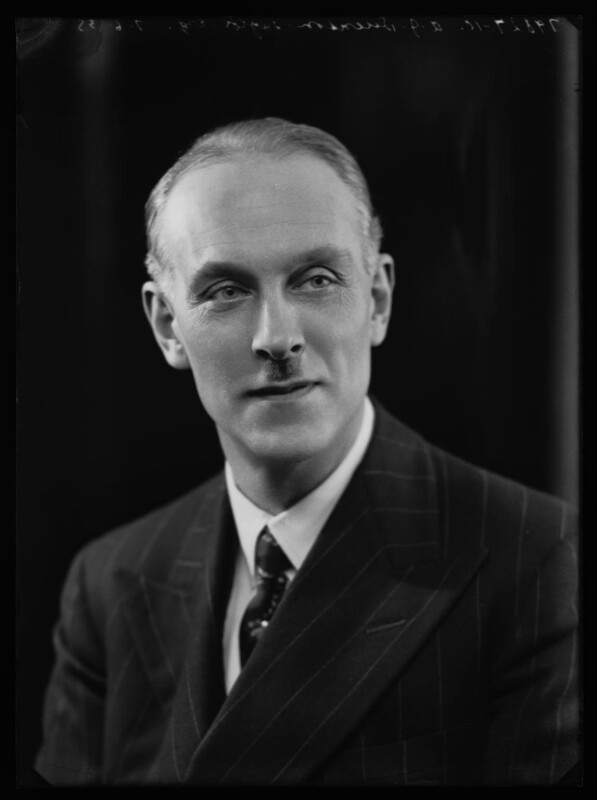

Treasurer of the Liberal Party
- In office 1953–1962

Personal details
- Born: Alfred Jesse Taylor; 14 August 1893
- Died: 2 July 1976 (aged 82)
- Relations: Charles Taylor (brother)

Alfred Jesse Suenson-Taylor, 1st Baron Grantchester (14 August 1893 – 2 July 1976) was a British banker, Liberal politician and a neo-liberal activist.

Born Alfred Jesse Taylor, he was the son of Alfred George Taylor of Stowford, Surrey. His younger brother was Charles Taylor. He was educated at Epsom College and King's College, Cambridge, and served at Gallipoli and in France during the First World War, reaching the rank of Major.

== Political career ==
He stood for parliament as a Liberal Party candidate four times. He was unsuccessful on each occasion:

1922 General Election: Isle of Thanet Electorate 38,500
Party	Candidate	Votes	%	±%
Unionist	Hon. Esmond Cecil Harmsworth	16,116	61.2	+3.3
Liberal	Alfred Jesse Suenson-Taylor	10,226	38.8	−3.3
Majority			22.4	+6.6
Turnout				
Unionist hold		Swing		

1923 General Election: Aldershot Electorate 25,932
Party	Candidate	Votes	%	±%
Unionist	Viscount Wolmer	9,131		
Liberal	Alfred Jesse Suenson-Taylor	6,315		
Majority				
Turnout				
Unionist hold		Swing		

1924 General Election: Derbyshire South Electorate 45,359
Party	Candidate	Votes	%	±%
Unionist	James Augustus Grant	16,448		
Labour	Alfred Goodere	15,033		
Liberal	Alfred Jesse Suenson-Taylor	5,647		
Majority				
Turnout				
Unionist hold		Swing		

General Election 1929: Isle of Thanet Electorate 58,330
Party	Candidate	Votes	%	±%
Unionist	Harold Harington Balfour	22,595	52.9	
Liberal	Alfred Jesse Suenson-Taylor	15,648	36.6	
Labour	E J Plaisted	4,490	10.5	
Majority		6,947	16.3	
Turnout			73.3	
Unionist hold		Swing		

In 1947 Suenson-Taylor played a significant role in gaining Bank of England support for the emergent Mont Pelerin Society. He was later President of the London Liberal Party. On 30 June 1953, he was raised to the peerage as Baron Grantchester, of Knightsbridge in the City of Westminster. Grantchester served as Chairman of the London and Manchester Assurance Company from 1953 to 1961, as Joint Honorary Treasurer of the Liberal Party Organisation from 1953 to 1962 and as President of the Society for Individual Freedom. He also initiated the unofficial meetings of the EFTA parliamentarians at Strasbourg and was a Delegate to the Assemblies of the Council of Europe and the Western European Union.

== Family life ==
He married Mara Henrietta (Mamie), daughter of Albert Suenson of Copenhagen in Denmark, in 1920, and assumed the surname of Suenson in addition to that of Taylor. He died in July 1976, aged 82, and was succeeded in the barony by his son Kenneth who married the daughter of Littlewoods founder Sir John Moores. His wife died the same year.

== Arms ==
Coat of arms of Alfred Suenson-Taylor, 1st Baron Grantchester
Crest 1st Issuant from a crown palisada Or a unicorn's head Sable armed and charged on the neck with an annulet Gold and holding in the mouth an acorn leaved and slipped Proper; 2nd issuant from a coronet composed of light roses Gules seeded Argent and set upon a rim Or a swan rousant Proper crowned with an antique crown Gold. Escutcheon Quarterly 1st & 4th : Sable on a fess engrailed between in chief a fleur-de-lys between two annulets Or and in base as many like annulets a lion passant of the field; 2nd & 3rd Gules : in chief two swans rousant Proper each crowned with an antique crown Or and in base barry wavy of six Argent and Azure. Supporters Dexter, an unicorn sable armed, and crined or, gorged with a collar argent, thereon a fesse wavy azure; Sinister, a lion or, gorged with a collar of four hearts gules. Motto Peace And Holy Quiet Badge A pellet edged Or charged with an owl standing towards the sinister Gold.

Peerage of the United Kingdom
New creation	Baron Grantchester; 1953–1976	Succeeded by Kenneth Bent Suenson-Taylor
Party political offices
Preceded by Baron Moynihan; Wulff Henry Grey	Treasurer of the Liberal Party; 1953–1962; With: Wulff Henry Grey (1953–1958); Philip Fothergill (1955–1959); Heather Harvey (1959–1962); Patrick Lort-Phillips (1959–1960); J. C. McLaughlin (1961–1962)	Succeeded by Ronald Gardner-Thorpe; Andrew Murray
