= Addolorata Cemetery, Paola =

Cemetery in Malta

Addolorata Cemetery
- Iċ-Ċimiterju tal-Addolorata
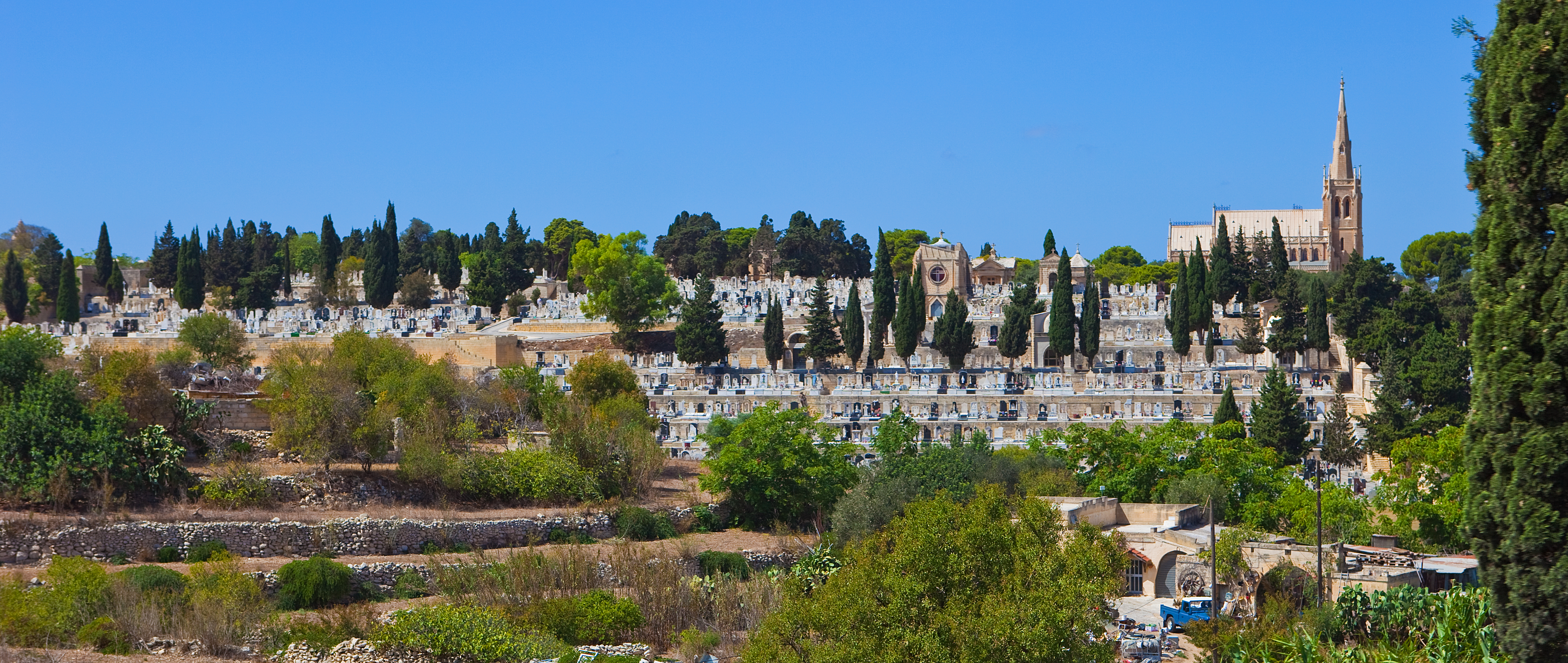
- View of the cemetery with its chapel on the right
- Interactive map of Addolorata Cemetery

Details
- Established: 9 May 1869
- Location: Paola, Malta
- Coordinates: 35°52′08″N 14°30′01″E
- Style: Neo-Gothic
- Owned by: Government of Malta
- No. of graves: c. 300,000

The Santa Maria Addolorata Cemetery (Maltese: Iċ-Ċimiterju ta' Santa Marija Addolorata, "Cemetery of Our Lady of Sorrows"; formerly Italian: Cimitero di Santa Maria Addolorata), often known simply as the Addolorata Cemetery (Maltese: Iċ-Ċimiterju tal-Addolorata), is a state-owned, Neo-Gothic cemetery located in Paola, Malta. It is a multi-faith cemetery, but predominantly characterized by Catholic burials. It is the largest burial ground in the country and has been expanded a number of times. People of all social background are buried within the cemetery, and it consists from temporary memorial plaques of the death (which are removed over time) to permanent monuments including chapels belonging to private families. The cemetery also includes Commonwealth War graves.

== History ==
The cemetery was built between 1862 and 1868 on a hill known as Tal-Ħorr (formerly Tal Palma in Maltese) which already hosted a burial ground since prehistoric times. The cemetery and the chapel were built in a neo-gothic design based on designs by the architect Emanuele Luigi Galizia. It was opened on May 9, 1869 and the first burial took place on January 23, 1872. This cemetery is full of old mausoleums and statues in marble and bronze. The cemetery was further extended in the 1970s.

The cemetery contains 277 identified interments and commemorations of military personnel killed in the country in World War I and World War II. Many graves are marked by Commonwealth War Graves Commission (CWGC) gravestones.

The language used in the tombstones is Italian until 1934, then mainly English. In more recent gravestones, the most frequently used language is Maltese.

== Chapel ==
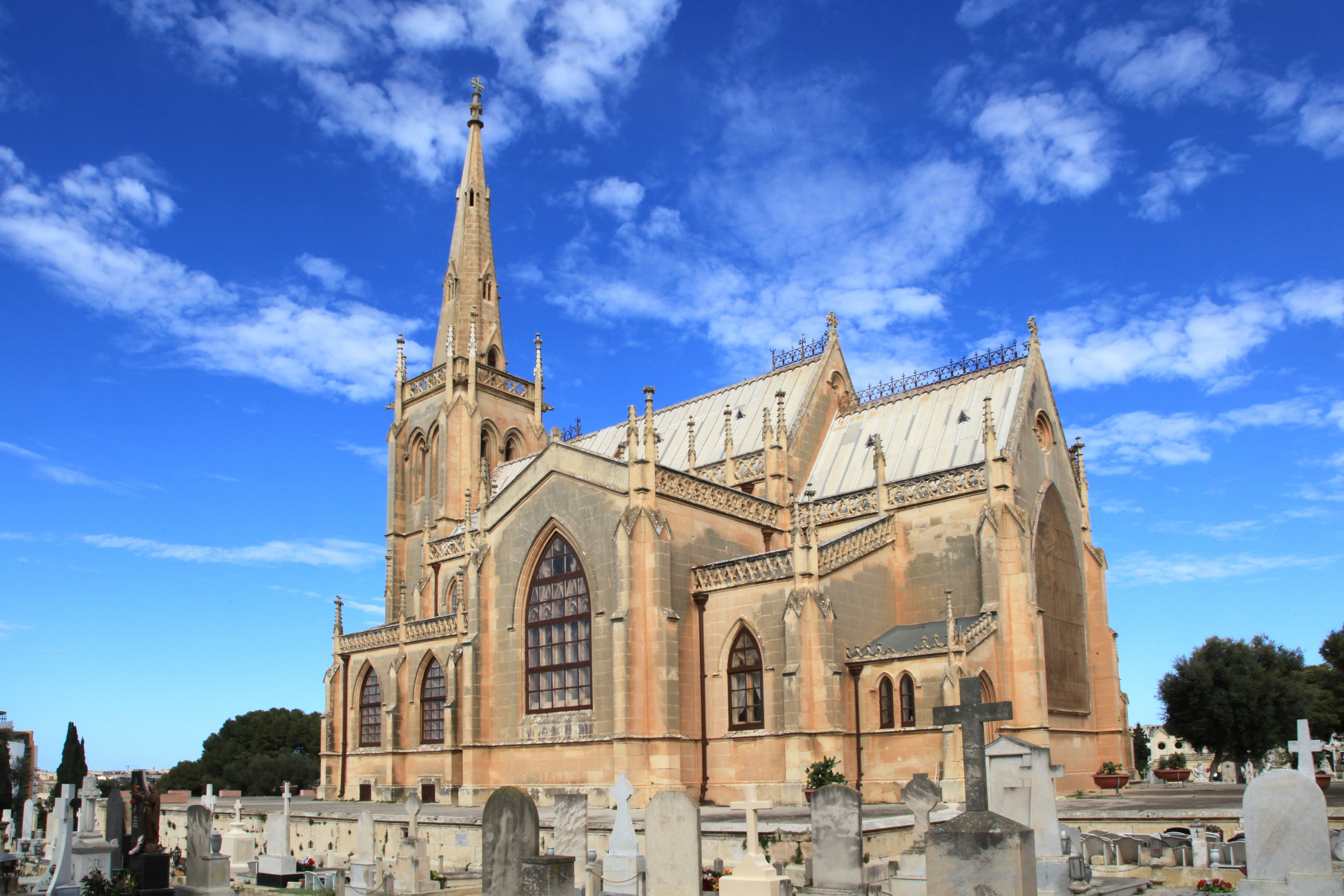
The Chapel of Our Lady (formerly Cappella della Beata Vergine Addolorata)

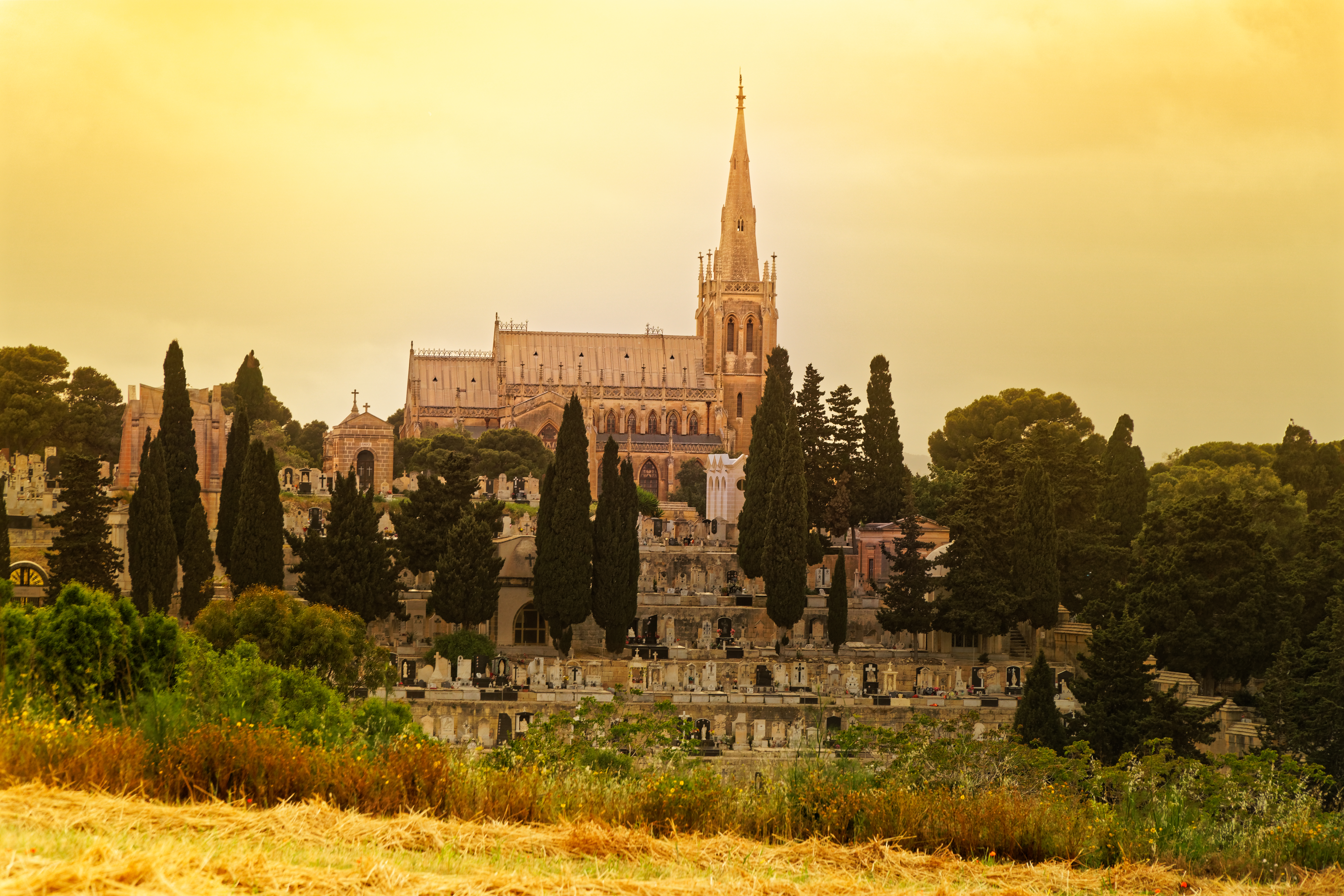

The iconic neo-gothic Chapel of Our Lady (formerly in Italian: Cappella della Beata Vergine Addolorata) is the centre of attraction within the whole complex. The cemetery is built around the chapel, which lies on the highest part of the hill. Its spire is visible from miles away above the surrounding trees. The care of the non-denominational chapel was in the hands of the Franciscan Capuchins until 2010.
