= Arabic in Islam =

In Islam, the Arabic language is given more importance than any other language because the primary religious sources of Islam, the Quran and Hadith, are in Arabic, which is referred to as Quranic Arabic.

Arabic is considered the ideal theological language of Islam and holds a special role in education and worship. Many Muslims view the Quran as divine revelation — it is believed to be the direct word of Allah (God) as it was revealed to Muhammad in Arabic. Almost all Muslims believe that the Quran in Arabic is an accurate copy of the original version received by Muhammad from Allah through the angelic messenger Gabriel during the ascension to heaven (Mi'raj).

However, this belief is not universal among all Muslims and only emerged with the development of Islam over time. Therefore, translations of the Quran into other languages are not considered the original Quran; rather, they are seen as interpretive texts that attempt to convey the message of the Quran. Despite being invalid for religious practices, these translations are generally accepted by Islamic religious authorities as interpretive guides for non-Arabic speakers.

== In Quran ==
In the Quran, it is clearly mentioned that it was revealed in Arabic so that its initial audience, who were predominantly Arabic-speaking, could fully comprehend its meanings and messages.

Indeed, We have sent it down as an Arabic Qur'an so that you might understand.

— 12:2

Also similar messages are given in 26:195, 43:3 and 20:113. The Qur'an also mentions that if it had not been revealed in Arabic, the non-believers of Islam would have doubted the Qur'an and the Prophet.

And if We had made it a non-Arabic Qur'an, they would have said, 'Why are its verses not explained in detail [in our language]? Is it a foreign [recitation] and an Arab [messenger]?' Say, 'It is, for those who believe, a guidance and cure.

— 41:44

== Language of Quran and Hadith ==
The Arabic language is considered a part of Islam's religion, and learning it is not just an educational goal but also an essential means for understanding and deep knowledge of Islamic sources. Classical scholars and intelligentsia recognized its importance, with Omar Ibn Al-Khattab stating it is essential for understanding the Quran. Ibn Al-Jawzi asserts that Arabic grammar and language are integral to Islamic sciences, providing a clear understanding of the Quran's meaning. Ibn Jinni argues weak Arabic knowledge leads to deviation from Islamic Sharia. Ibn Taymiya considers Arabic knowledge a religious obligatory must for understanding the Quran and Sunnah.

Arabic linguistics has its roots in the Quran and pre-Islamic poetry, with the first reliable book of Arabic grammar "Sibawayh" appearing by the end of the second century of Hijra. Before the advent of Islam, Arabic tradition was mainly oral, with the writing tradition beginning with the Quran. This written tradition was inspired by the religious challenges of the new era, pen and book. Despite the shortcomings of the pre-Islamic Arabs in documenting their oral tradition, the Islamic written recovery of this oral tradition allows us to appreciate the linguistic supremacy of the Arabs before Islam. The Quran challenged the linguistic shrewdness of the first Muslim generations, as it was revealed in the language of the Arabs, allowing them to understand and know its meanings both in vocabulary and syntax. Narratives often show Muhammad giving an exegesis of verses or words that were not clear enough for their companions or had an allegorical meaning.

Quran has significantly influenced the bond between Islam and the Arabic language, leading to the development of various Islamic sciences, particularly in Arabic literature and literature. Muslim scholars like Fazlur Rahman Malik claim that all non-secular sciences in Islam owe their origin to the Quran. The doctrine of 'inimitability' of the Quran is common across Muslim schools and has been a key factor in Arabic literature.

John Penrice emphasizes the nature of the Quran's language calling it "miraculous" as a standard for Arabic literature. He believes that a competent knowledge of the Koran is essential for understanding Arabic literature, even without belief in its divine origin. He states, Quran contains transcendent excellencies and poetic ideas, with rich and appropriate language that transcends translation.

During the early years of Islam, Arabic was crucial in its Quranic level. As Islam expanded, the dangers of misreading and misunderstanding the Quran's text increased. Ibn Khaldoun discussed the importance of Arabic in the Muslim world and the mixing of Arabic with non-Arabic languages due to foreign invasions. Quranic sciences emerged, leading to the establishment of tafsir-schools in Mecca, Medina, and Iraq. The emergence of a tafsir methodology in Islam aimed to protect the "divine word" from human language variability. The diachrony of Arabic language remained a significant factor in human interaction with the Quranic text.

Abu Hamid Al-Ghazali explains how Islamic terms like salah, hajj, sawm, and zakat evolved from their original linguistic meanings. Islam added religious preconditions to these terms, including kinetic activities like kneeling and prostrating, and incorporating religious practices like circling the Kaba and standing on the Arafa mount.

=== Use of the word "Allah" ===
A calligraphic rendition of the Bismillah

Hamid Nadim Rafiabadi claimed the word "Allah" as untranslatable as a "good" or "God." It is distinct from all names and cannot be derived. According to Abdul Majid Daryabadi the English word "God" is a common German word to refer any superhuman figures from pagan mythologies who possess authority over both nature and humans, as an object of worship, but the word Allah is totally unique to it.

Allah, originally al-ilah, is derived from alaha (we worshiped) or aliha (he was bewildered). Al-ilah means al-Matuh, the object of worship or the object of confusion for minds. The verb aliha signifies looking for safety, support, and sanctuary in order to survive, saving, rescuing, or delivering from evil. Adding the definite article "al" results in the word "Allah." According to Abdullah Ibn Abbas, Allah is the One Everyone takes as its god and worships, possessing the attributes of divinity and being worshiped. Alaha means to worship, it gives rise to the verbal noun ilaha.

There is a disagreement on the etymological aspect of the Islamic Quranic word "Allah," including its origin, origin, and usage. Some scholars believe it originates from the term Ilahia in Chaldean and Syriac, which became Allah in Arabic later on. Others believe it is a Hebrew word, Eloha or Alaha (אלהא), used by Jews and Christians alike. The original form of the word was LAHA, which later evolved into Gabriel, Michael, Ismael, and Israel. When Arabicized, the final Alif was left out and replaced with LAM, making the sound of Lam more prominent. In Hebrew, words like "Eli" and "Elah" are conspicuous, indicating that God is exalted, and the words "Eliyahu" and "Eliyahu" signify worship of the deity. The Arabicization of these words has led to a debate on its origin and meaning.

Marmaduke Pickthall notes that since the word Allah is neither feminine nor plural and has only ever been used to refer to the unfathomable supreme being, there is no equivalent term for Allah in English. The word "God" was used in old English, Icelandic, Danish, Swedish, and German, but from a monotheistic viewpoint, it represents the supreme being, all-powerful, omniscient, eternal, infinite spirit, and creator and ruler of the universe, whom humans worship. The word can also be found with the small letter "g," which indicates a male who is considered to be immortal and endowed with supernatural abilities. It also refers to anything or anyone who has been the subject of extreme or unrestrained devotion; the old English word for this is godship. These characteristics of the term "god" or "God" are not appropriate for "Al-lah" because they are associated with the polytheistic, Trinitarian, or dualistic nature of the deity.

The concept of Allah and related terms are discussed in Fakhruddin Razi's Tafsir, wherein it is argued that the word Allah is a proper noun rather than a derivative. La ilaha illallah, in his opinion, suggests the total unity of God and rejects identification with numerous other gods. Since Allah is a proper name that captures the essence of Allah uniquely, derivatives are not appropriate. His well-known statements shed important light on the idea of God's distinct essence.

The term "Allah" is more appropriate than the term "God," which is frequently linked to aspects of polytheism, trinitarianism, and dualistic thinking. According to the Quran, there is only one God, and anyone who believes that Allah has partners will not be allowed to enter paradise and will not have any support. There is only one God, thus the Quran forbids disbelieving that Allah is the third of three gods. The pagan Arabs also referred to their gods as "Allah," allocating a portion of their altruistic duties to both Allah and their gods. According to Hamiduddin Farahi, the Arabic word "Al" (the) is used specifically for "Allah," and it is only used for Allah, the one who created the earth, the heavens, and all living things. This word has the same meaning among the Arabs.

Rahman is described as a forgiving being who desires goodness and the betterment of all creatures in the Tafsir al-Jalalayn. On the other hand, Rahim is a common term but lexically specific, whereas Rahman is specific in meaning but common in literal sense. Al-Rahman is the universal kindness that Allah bestows on all beings, good and bad, believers and unbelievers alike. The limitless benefits of life are bestowed upon all people, and they provide them with sustenance in abundance. Ar-Rahim, on the other hand, speaks exclusively of the special mercy given to believers and submissive servants. Although Rahim is indeed occasionally used with this same the meaning of an endless kind of mercy, Rahman focused in the Quran meaning.

The words Rahman and Rahim, which are generated from the root Rahmat, signify gentleness and affection. Rahman is the precursor to the Arabic verb, meaning the highest importance in divine mercy, whereas the latter makes use of the infinite supply of grace from the divine being. Both Rahman and Rahim are active participle nouns with distinct paradigms; Rahman represents the highest form of Arabic verb, while Rahim expresses how that grace manifests itself in and affects his creation.

== Art and literature ==
For many centuries, Arabic served as the linguistic vehicle through which many of Islamic civilization's religious, cultural, and intellectual achievements were articulated and refined. Recitation of the Quran is an artistic tradition similar to that of opera singing, where a singer (known as a qāriʾ) is expected to have mastery of vocal skills. Outside daily prayer, recitations of the Quran in Arabic play a large role in major rituals such as marriage or funerary rites.

The Muslim world is known for a tradition of calligraphy, where handwritten copies of the Quran are revered or preserved as museum pieces. The visual tradition of depicting Muhammad, in particular, is to represent his name in calligraphy rather than depict him visually as a human figure.

== Nationalism and Islamization ==
Arabic's role in Islam has been a major contributing factor to nationalist projects, both within and without the Arab world. Arab nationalists have supported the development of Modern Standard Arabic as an official state language in the Arab world, often making a direct connection between the language and the Islamic faith. Nationalist projects in individual Arab nations often seek to implement the local vernacular dialect as the official language, but are met with religious opposition for "separating the Arabs from their one divine language."

Arabic script was first used to write texts in Arabic, most notably the Quran, the holy book of Islam. With the religion's spread, it came to be used as the primary script for many language families, leading to the addition of new letters and other symbols. Such languages still using it are: Persian (Farsi and Dari), Malay (Jawi), Cham (Akhar Srak), Uyghur, Kurdish, Punjabi (Shahmukhi), Sindhi, Balti, Balochi, Pashto, Lurish, Urdu, Kashmiri, Rohingya, Somali, Mandinka, and Mooré, among others. Until the 16th century, it was also used for some Spanish texts, and—prior to the script reform in 1928—it was the writing system of Turkish.

=== Algeria ===
Modern Standard Arabic, as the Quran's language, has been widely used in Algeria due to its opposition to neocolonial language and religion. Algerian nationalists' enthusiasm for Islam and Arabic, and rejection of French-associated language and culture, has led to sociolinguistic chaos, with many Algerian speakers lacking proper command of either language.

=== Egypt ===
The Islamization of Egypt occurred after the 7th century Arab conquest of Egypt, in which the Islamic Rashidun Caliphate seized control of Egypt from the Christian Byzantine Empire. Egypt and other conquered territories in the Middle East underwent a large scale gradual conversion from Christianity to Islam, accompanied by jizya for those who refused to convert. Islam became the dominant faith by the 10th to 12th centuries, and Arabic replaced Coptic as the vernacular language and Greek as the official language.

=== Iran ===
The Islamization of Iran was the spread of Islam in formerly Sassanid Iran as a result of the Muslim conquest of the empire in 633–654. It was a long process by which Islam, though initially rejected, eventually spread among the population on the Iranian Plateau. Iranian peoples have maintained certain pre-Islamic traditions, including their language and culture, and adapted them with Arabian Islamic codes, specially using Arabic script in Farsi language. These two customs and traditions merged as the "Iranian Islamic" identity.

=== Pakistan ===
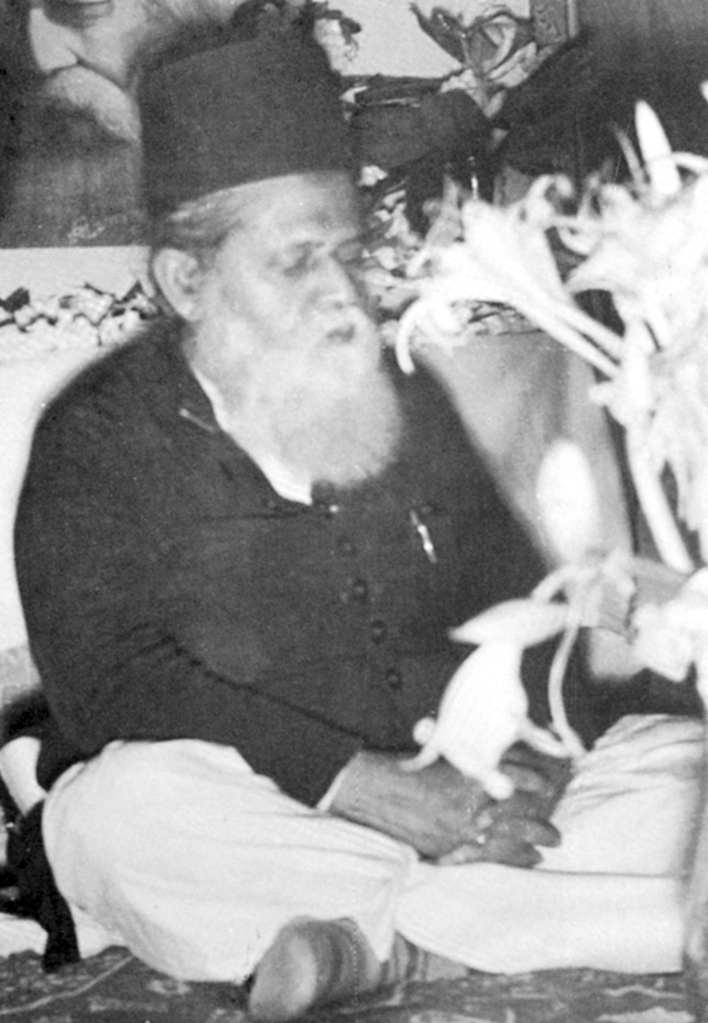
Muhammad Shahidullah was a central figure in the proposal to make Arabic the state language.

Article 1 of the Universal Declaration of Human Rights in Dobhashi Bengali.

In Pakistan, where Arabic is not a native language of the country's ethnic groups, Arabic has still held a role in the state's religious nationalist project. Arabic is mentioned in the constitution of Pakistan. It declares in article 31 No. 2 that "The State shall endeavour, as respects the Muslims of Pakistan (a) to make the teaching of the Holy Quran and Islamiat compulsory, to encourage and facilitate the learning of Arabic language ..."

The Senate of Pakistan passed the Compulsory Teaching of the Arabic Language Bill on February 1, 2021, making Arabic teaching compulsory in Islamabad's primary and secondary schools.

After the creation of Pakistan in 1947 during East Pakistani language movement, many advocated to Muhammad Ali Jinnah making Arabic the state language of Pakistan as a Muslim nationalist country, which was later supported and reiterated by many, but the proposal ultimately did not gain popular support and popularity. These proposals to make Arabic the state language failed to gain substantial support in any part of Pakistan. However, as this demand is linked to the question of the development of Islamic culture, it indirectly reinforced the demand for the introduction of Arabic script in the state language Urdu and Bengali (Dobhashi) in some quarters.

=== Turkey ===
Ottoman Turkish (لِسانِ عُثمانى Lisân-ı Osmânî, Turkish pronunciation: [liˈsaːnɯ osˈmaːniː]; Osmanlı Türkçesi) was the standardized register of the Turkish language in the Islamic Ottoman Empire (14th to 20th centuries CE). It borrowed extensively, in all aspects, from Arabic and Persian. It was written in the Ottoman Turkish alphabet. During the peak of Ottoman power (c. 16th century CE), words of foreign origin mostly from Arabic and Persian, heavily outnumbered native Turkish words in Turkish literature in the Ottoman Empire, with Arabic and Persian vocabulary accounting for up to 88% of the Ottoman vocabulary in some texts.

=== Malta ===
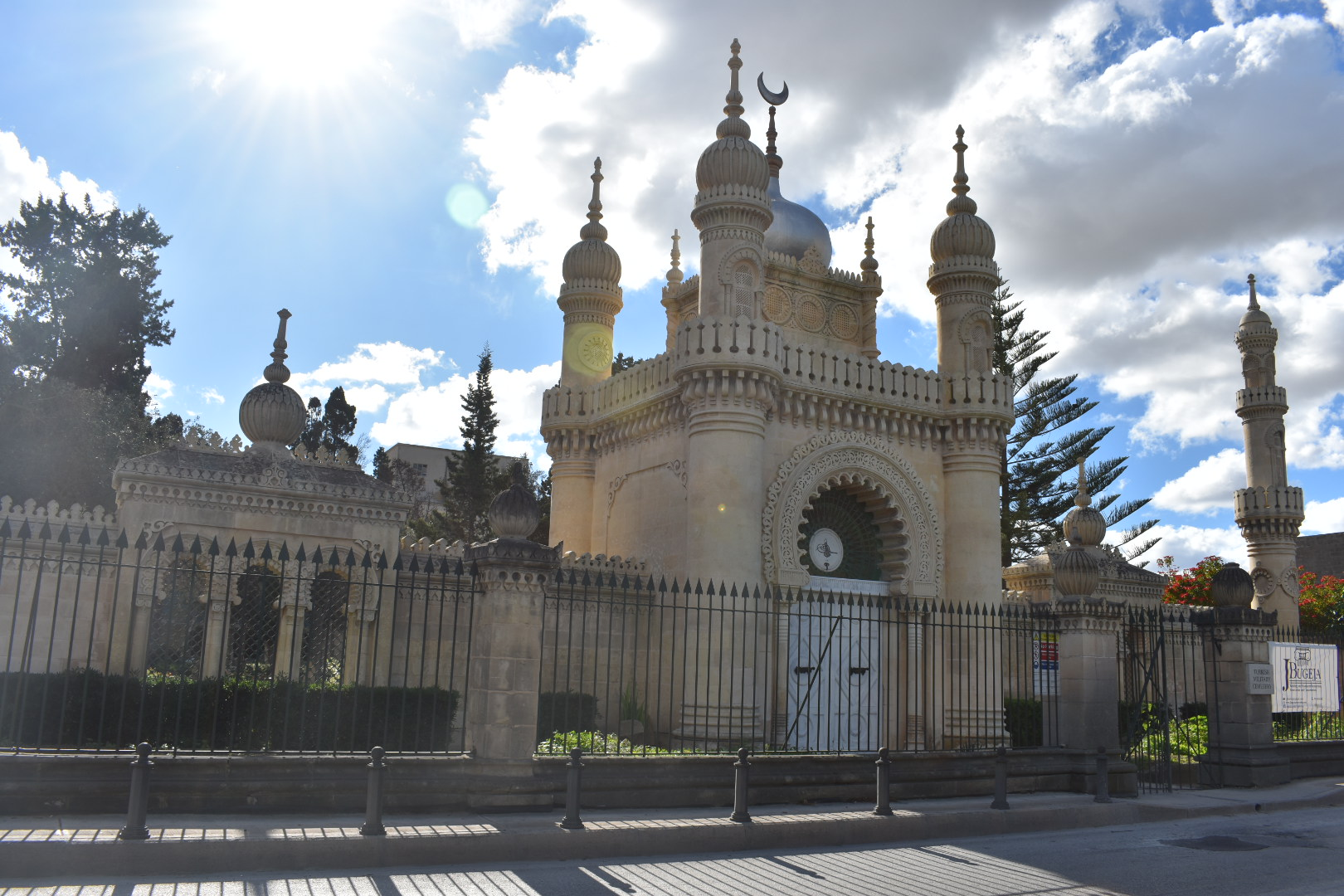
The Turkish Military Cemetery (Ottoman) in Marsa, Malta, built in 1874 on neo-moorish plans by Maltese architect Emanuele Luigi Galizia.

The strongest legacy of Islam in Malta is the Maltese language, which is very close to Tunisian Arabic and most place names (other than the names Malta and Gozo) are Arabic, as are most surnames, e.g. Borg, Cassar, Chetcuti, Farrugia, Fenech, Micallef, Mifsud and Zammit. It has been argued that this survival of the Maltese language, as opposed to the extinction of Siculo-Arabic in Sicily, is probably due to the eventual large-scale conversions to Christianity of the proportionally large Maltese Muslim population. The pioneering Maltese linguists Canon Giovanni Pietro Francesco Agius de Soldanis and Mikiel Anton Vassalli both mistakenly hypothesised that Maltese originated from the Punic language. Later scholars like John L. Hayes, considered it to be descended from a North African dialect of Colloquial Arabic which was introduced to Malta when the Aghlabids captured it in the 9th century. However, genetic studies and historical evidence have established that Malta was depopulated after that raid, and that the island was subsequently repopulated by settlers from Sicily and Calabria who spoke Siculo-Arabic, which had developed as a Maghrebi Arabic dialect in the Emirate of Sicily between 831 and 1091... As a result of the Norman invasion of Malta and the subsequent re-Christianisation of the islands, Maltese evolved independently of Classical Arabic in a gradual process of Latinisation. It is therefore exceptional as a variety of historical Arabic that has no diglossic relationship with Classical or Modern Standard Arabic. Maltese is thus classified separately from the 30 varieties constituting the modern Arabic macrolanguage. Maltese is also distinguished from Arabic and other Semitic languages since its morphology has been deeply influenced by Romance languages, namely Italian and Sicilian.

According to the Arab chronicler and geographer al-Ḥimyarī (author of Kitab al-Rawḍ al-Miṭar), following the Muslim attack and conquest, Malta was practically uninhabited until it was colonised by Muslims from Sicily in 1048–1049, or possibly several decades earlier. As recognised by the acclaimed Maltese historian Godfrey Wettinger, the Arab conquest broke any continuity with previous population of the island. This is also consistent with Joseph Brincat’s linguistic finding of no further sub-stratas beyond Arabic in the Maltese language, a very rare occurrence which may only be explained by a drastic lapse between one period and the following.

The original Arabic base comprises around one-third of the Maltese vocabulary, especially words that denote basic ideas and the function words, but about half of the vocabulary is derived from standard Italian and Sicilian; and English words make up 6–20% of the vocabulary. A 2016 study shows that, in terms of basic everyday language, speakers of Maltese are able to understand less than a third of what is said to them in Tunisian Arabic and Libyan Arabic, which are Maghrebi Arabic dialects related to Siculo-Arabic, whereas speakers of Tunisian Arabic and Libyan Arabic are able to understand about 40% of what is said to them in Maltese. This reported level of asymmetric intelligibility is considerably lower than the mutual intelligibility found between mainstream varieties of Arabic.

Maltese has always been written in the Latin script, the earliest surviving example dating from the late Middle Ages. It is the only standardised Semitic language written exclusively in the Latin script.

== Sources ==
- Brincat, Joseph M. (2005). "Maltese – an unusual formula". MED Magazine (27). Archived from the original on 5 September 2005.
- Chism, Christine (2009). "Arabic in the medieval world". Publications of the Modern Language Association of America. 124: 624–631. doi:10.1632/pmla.2009.124.2.624.
- Ernst, Carl W. (2013). How to Read the Qur'an: A New Guide, with Select Translations (بالإنجليزية). The University of North Carolina Press. ISBN 978-0-8078-3516-6. OCLC 770009460.
- Mabry, Tristan James (2015). Nationalism, Language, and Muslim Exceptionalism. University of Pennsylvania Press. doi:10.9783/9780812291018. ISBN 978-0-8122-9101-8.
- Rahman, Tariq (2000). "The teaching of Arabic to the Muslims of South Asia". Islamic Studies. 39 (3): 399–443.
- Suleiman, Yasir (2003). The Arabic Language and National Identity: A Study in Ideology. Edinburgh University Press. ISBN 978-1-4744-7293-7.
