= Islam in Malta =

Islam in Europe by percentage of country population 95–100%: Azerbaijan; 90–95%: Turkey; Kosovo; 50–70%: Albania; Bosnia and Herzegovina; Kazakhstan; 30–35%: North Macedonia; 10–20%: France; Georgia; Montenegro; 5–10%: Austria; Belgium; Bulgaria; Denmark; Germany; Liechtenstein; Luxembourg; Netherlands; Russia; Sweden; Switzerland; United Kingdom; Spain; Greece; 4–5%: Serbia; 2–4%: Italy; Finland; Norway; Malta; Slovenia; Cyprus (Note: Only takes into account the Muslim population residing on land controlled by the Republic of Cyprus.); 1–2%: Croatia; Ireland; Ukraine; Andorra; < 1%: Iceland; Armenia; Belarus; Czech Republic; Estonia; Hungary; Latvia; Lithuania; Moldova; Monaco; Poland; Portugal; Romania; San Marino; Slovakia

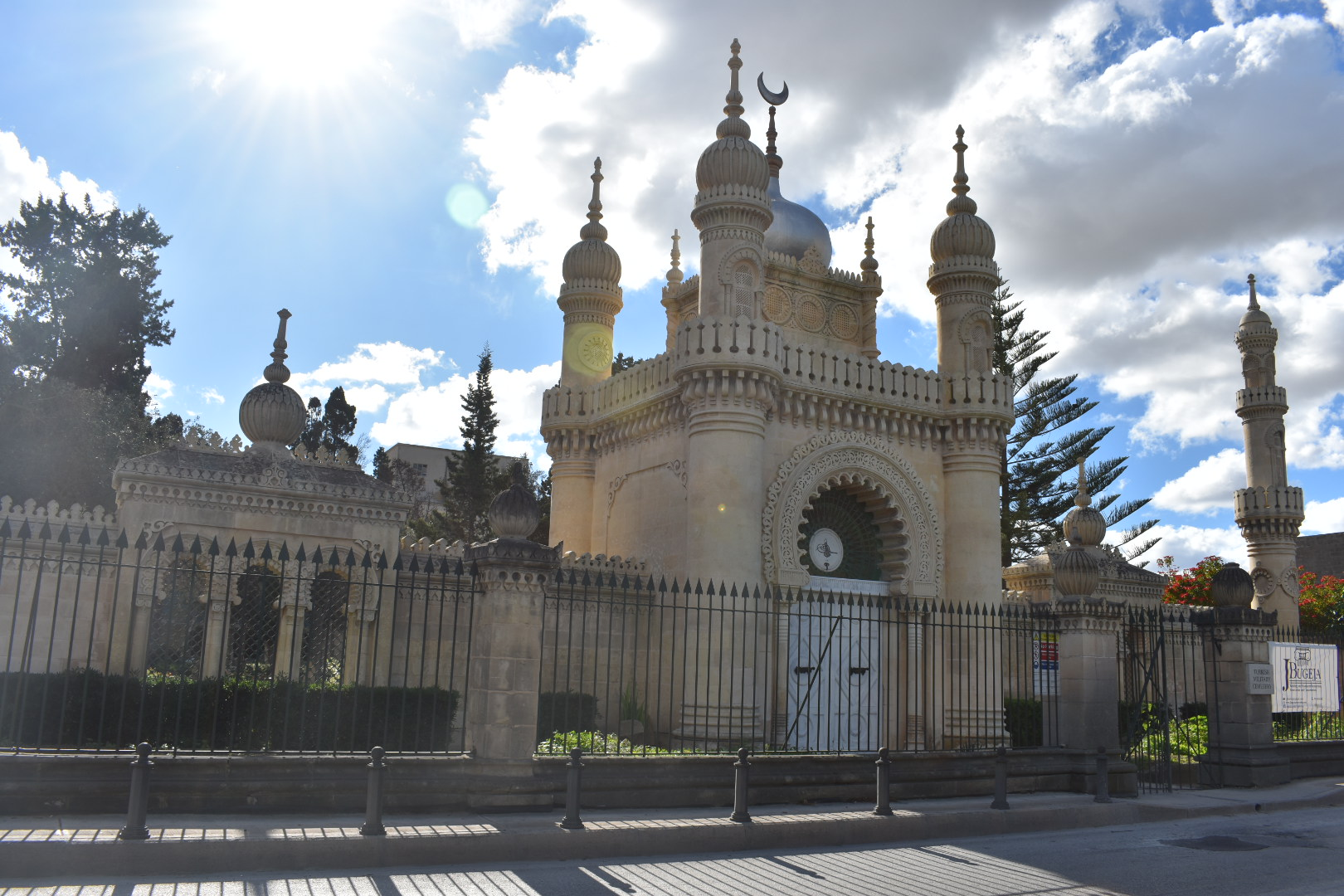
The Turkish Military Cemetery (Ottoman) in Marsa, Malta, built in 1874 on neo-moorish plans by Maltese architect Emanuele Luigi Galizia.

Islam in Malta (Arabic: الإسلام في مالطا) has had a historically profound influence upon the country — especially its language and agriculture — as a consequence of several centuries of control and presence on the islands. Today, the main Muslim organization represented in Malta is the Libyan World Islamic Call Society.

The 2021 census found that the Muslim population in Malta grew from 6,000 in 2010 to 17,454 in 2021, mainly non-citizens, totalling 3.9% of the population.

== History ==
Prior to Muslim rule, Eastern Christianity had been prominent in Malta during the time of Greek-Byzantine rule. The thesis of a Christian continuity in Malta during Arab rule, despite being popular, is historically unfounded.

=== Aghlabid period: 870–1091 ===
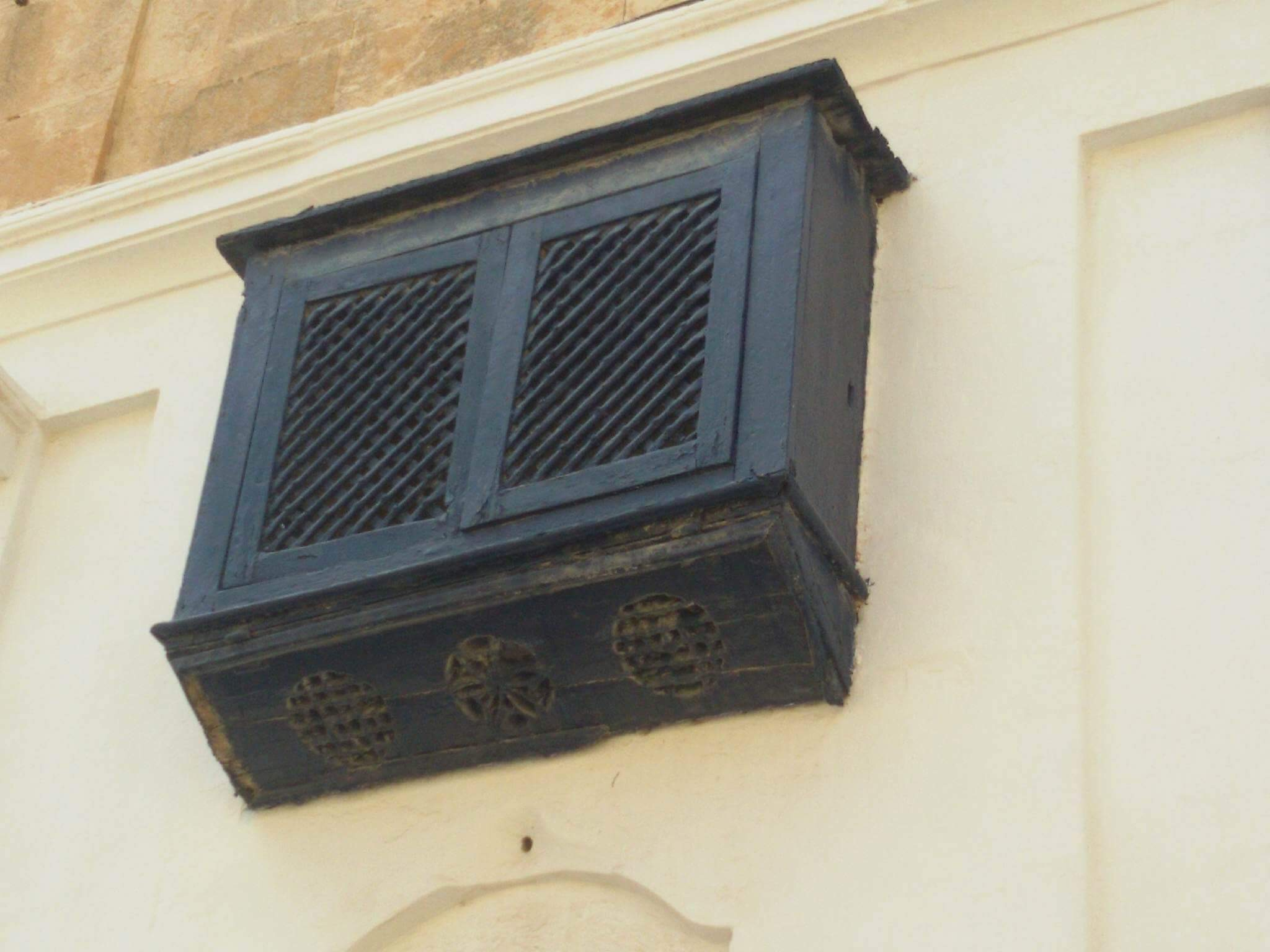
Wooden muxrabija in Qrendi

Islam is believed to have been introduced to Malta when the North African Aghlabids, first led by Halaf al-Hadim and later by Sawada ibn Muhammad, conquered the islands from the Byzantines, after arriving from Sicily in 870 (as part of the wider Arab–Byzantine wars). However, it has also been argued that the islands were occupied by Muslims earlier in the 9th, and possibly 8th, century. The Aghlabids established their capital in Mdina. The old Roman fortification, later to become Fort St Angelo, was also extended.

According to the Arab chronicler and geographer al-Ḥimyarī (author of Kitab al-Rawḍ al-Miṭar), following the Muslim attack and conquest, Malta was practically uninhabited until it was colonised by Muslims from Sicily in 1048–1049, or possibly several decades earlier. As recognised by the acclaimed Maltese historian Godfrey Wettinger, the Arab conquest broke any continuity with previous population of the island. This is also consistent with Joseph Brincat’s linguistic finding of no further sub-stratas beyond Arabic in the Maltese language, a very rare occurrence which may only be explained by a drastic lapse between one period and the following.

The strongest legacy of Islam in Malta is the Maltese language, which is very close to Tunisian Arabic and most place names (other than the names Malta and Gozo) are Arabic, as are most surnames, e.g. Borg, Cassar, Chetcuti, Farrugia, Fenech, Micallef, Mifsud and Zammit. It has been argued that this survival of the Maltese language, as opposed to the extinction of Siculo-Arabic in Sicily, is probably due to the eventual large-scale conversions to Christianity of the proportionally large Maltese Muslim population.

The Muslims also introduced innovative and skillful irrigation techniques such as the water-wheel known as the Noria or Sienja, all of which made Malta more fertile. They also introduced sweet pastries and spices and new crops, including citrus, figs, almond, as well as the cultivation of the cotton plant, which would become the mainstay of the Maltese economy for several centuries, until the latter stages of the rule of the Knights of St. John. The distinctive landscape of terraced fields is also the result of introduced ancient Arab methods. Maltese Catholicism remained influenced by the Muslim presence and background, including for the words for God (Alla) and Lent (Randan).

Elements of Islamic architecture also remain in the vernacular Maltese style, including the muxrabija, wooden oriel windows similar to the mashrabiya.

=== Norman period: 1091–1224 ===
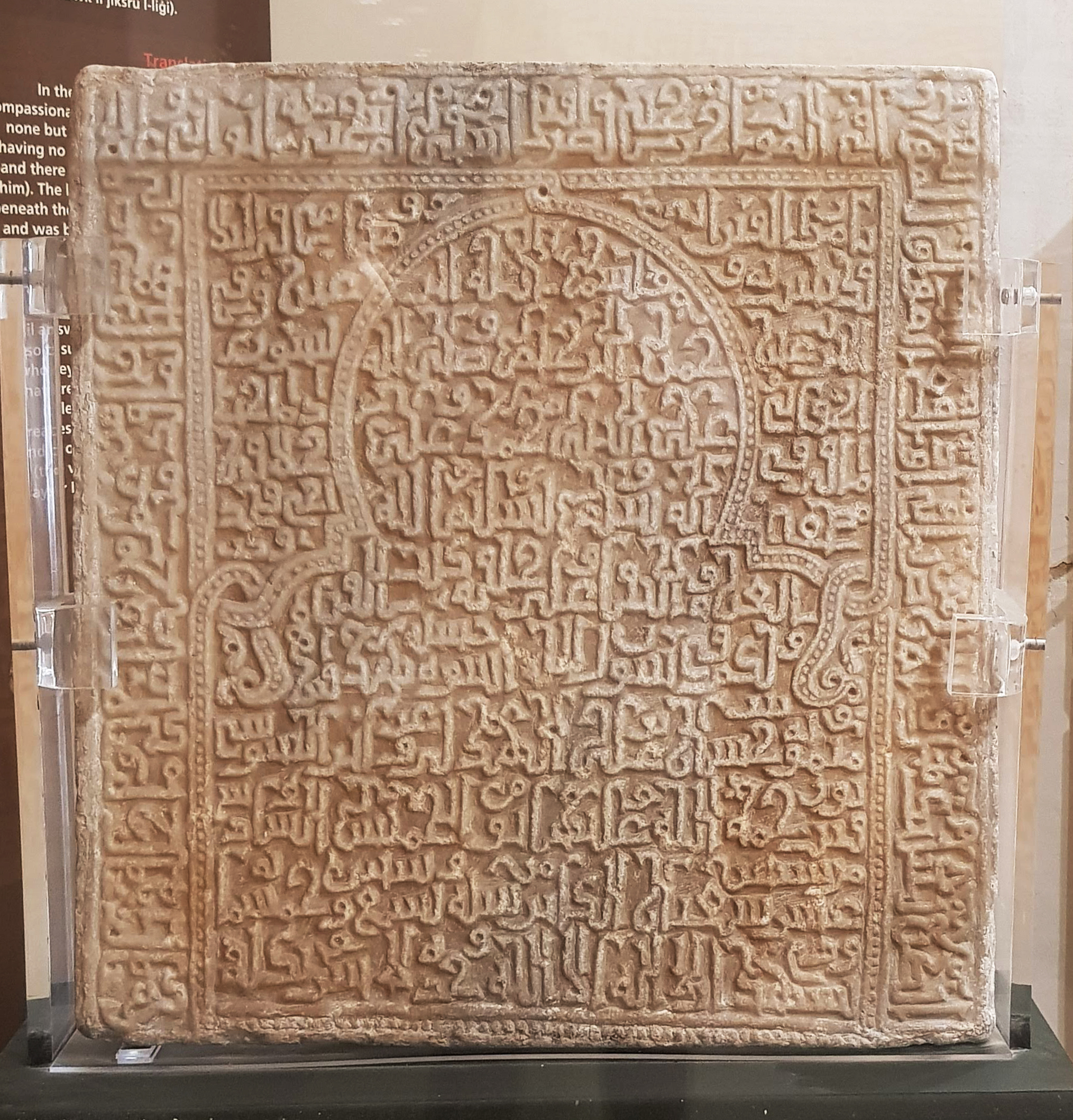
Gozo's Maymūnah Stone, from 1174

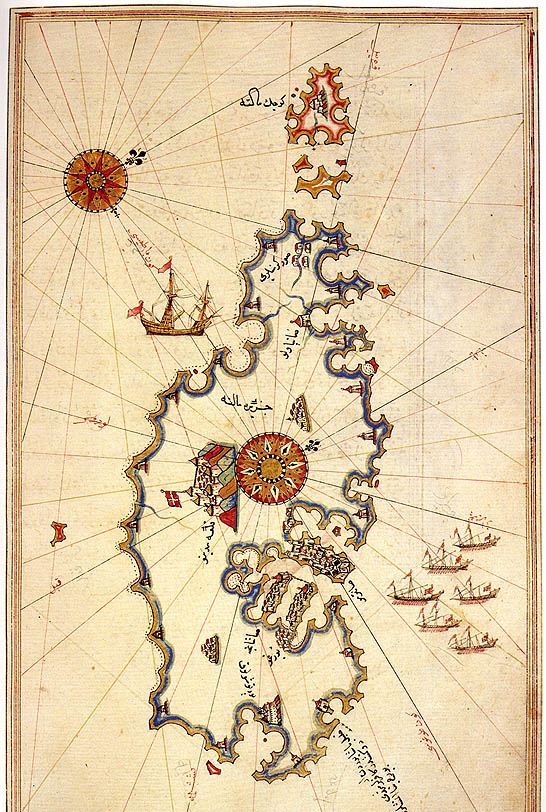
Map of Malta by Piri Reis (1467-1554), Kitab-ı Bahriye (Book of Navigation)

Malta returned to Christian rule with the Norman conquest in 1127. It was, with Noto on the southern tip of Sicily, the last Arab stronghold in the region to be retaken by the resurgent Christians.

The Arab administration was initially kept in place and Muslims were allowed to practise their religion freely until the 13th century. The Normans allowed an emir to remain in power with the understanding that he would pay an annual tribute to them in mules, horses, and munitions. As a result of this favourable environment, Muslims continued to demographically and economically dominate Malta for at least another 150 years after the Christian conquest.

In 1122 Malta experienced a Muslim uprising and in 1127 Roger II of Sicily reconquered the islands.

Even in 1175, Burchard, bishop of Strasbourg, an envoy of Frederick I, Holy Roman Emperor, had the impression, based upon his brief visit to Malta, that it was exclusively or mainly inhabited by Muslims.

In 1224, Frederick II, Holy Roman Emperor, sent an expedition against Malta to establish royal control and prevent its Muslim population from helping a Muslim rebellion in the Kingdom of Sicily.

The conquest of the Normans lead to the gradual Latinization and subsequent firm establishment of Roman Catholicism in Malta, after previous respective Eastern Orthodox and Islamic domination.

=== Anjou and Aragonese period: 1225–1529 ===
According to a report in 1240 or 1241 by Gililberto Abbate, who was the royal governor of Frederick II of Sicily during the Genoese Period of the County of Malta, in that year the islands of Malta and Gozo had 836 Muslim families, 1250 Christian families and 33 Jewish families.

In 1266, Malta was turned over in fiefdom to Charles of Anjou, brother of France’s King Louis IX, who retained it in ownership until 1283. Eventually, during Charles's rule religious coexistence became precarious in Malta, since he had a genuine intolerance of religions other than Roman Catholicism. However, Malta's links with Africa would remain strong until the beginning of Spanish rule in 1283.

According to the author Stefan Goodwin, by the end of the 15th century all Maltese Muslims would be forced to convert to Christianity and had to find ways to disguise their previous identities. Professor Godfrey Wettinger, who specialized in Malta's medieval history, writes that the medieval Arab historian Ibn Khaldun (1332–1406) puts the expulsion of Islam from Malta to the year 1249. Wettinger goes on to say that "there is no doubt that by the beginning of Angevin times [i.e. shortly after 1249] no professed Muslim Maltese remained either as free persons or even as serfs on the island."

=== Knights of St. John: 1530–1798 ===
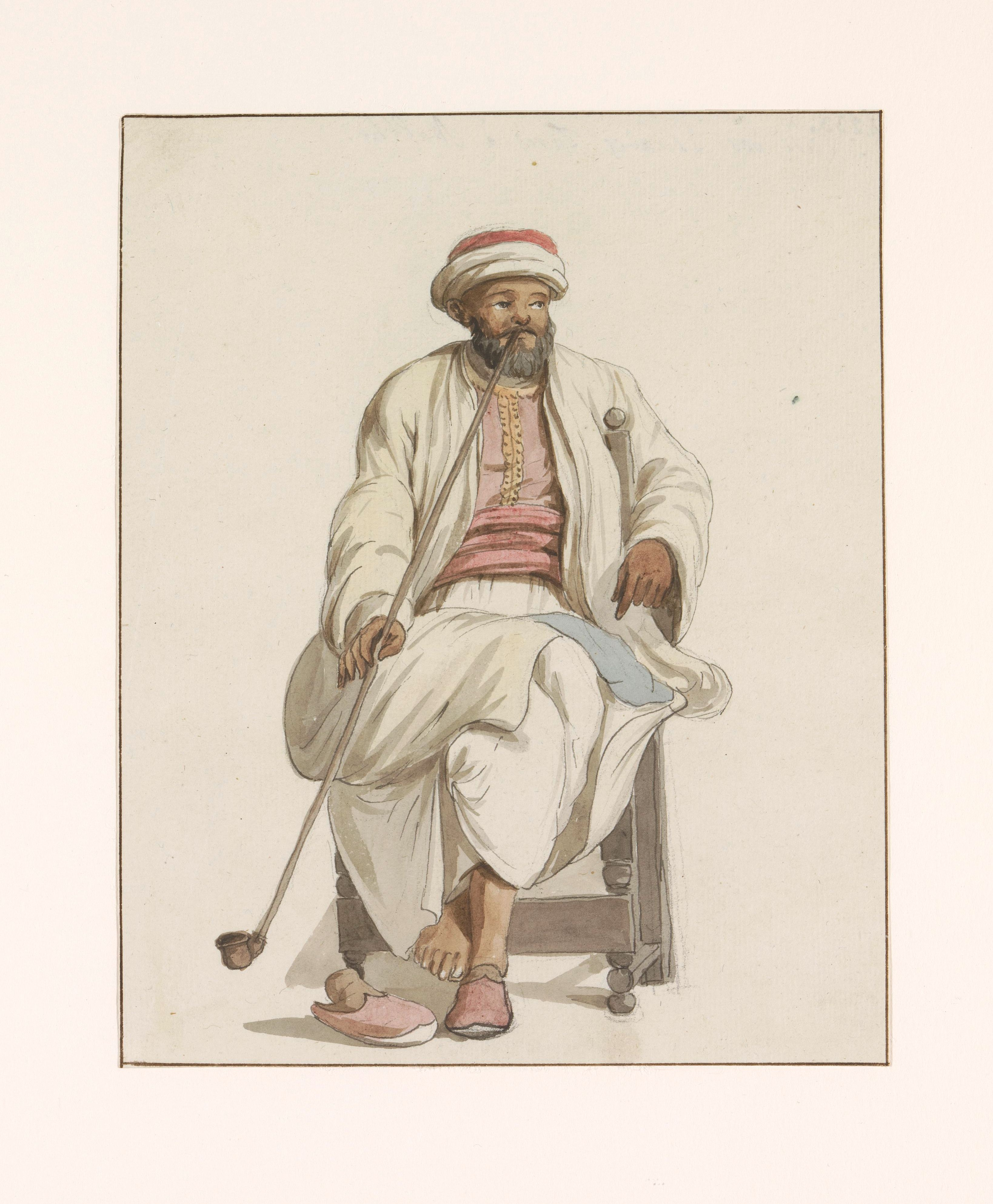
Painting of a Turkish slave kadi in Malta by Abraham-Louis-Rodolphe Ducros, 1778

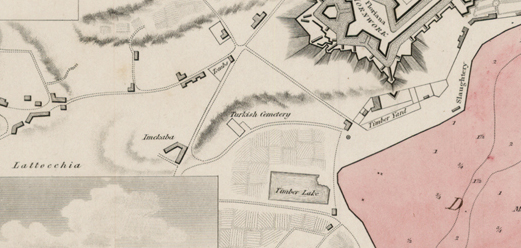
1675-1865 Turkish Cemetery at Spencer Hill (Via della Croce), Marsa/Hamrun

During the period of rule under the Knights Hospitaller, thousands of Muslim slaves, captured as a result of maritime raids, were taken to Malta. In the mid-18th century, there were around 9,000 Muslim slaves in Hospitaller-ruled Malta. They were given a substantial amount of freedom, being allowed to gather for prayers. Although there were laws preventing them from interacting with the Maltese people, these were not regularly enforced. Some slaves also worked as merchants, and at times were allowed to sell their wares in the streets and squares of Valletta. A mosque was built in 1702 during the Order of St John for Turkish slaves within the Slaves' Prison of which neither ruins nor description of its architecture now remain.

After the failure of the Conspiracy of the Slaves (1749), laws restricting the movement of slaves were made stricter. They could not go outside the city limits, and were not to approach any fortifications. They were not allowed to gather anywhere except from their mosque, and were to sleep only in the slave prisons. Moreover, they could not carry any weapons or keys of government buildings.

There was also a deliberate and ultimately successful campaign, using disinformation and often led by the Roman Catholic clergy, to de-emphasize Malta's historic links with Africa and Islam. This distorted history "determined the course of Maltese historiography till the second half of the twentieth century", and it created the rampant Islamophobia which has been a traditional feature of Malta, like other southern European states.

A number of Muslim cemeteries have been located in various locations around Marsa since the 16th century. A cemetery in il-Menqa contained the graves of Ottoman soldiers killed in the Great Siege of Malta of 1565 as well as Muslim slaves who died in Malta. This cemetery was replaced in 1675 by another one near Spencer Hill (Via della Croce), following the construction of the Floriana Lines. Human remains believed to originate from one of these cemeteries were discovered during road works in 2012. The remains of a cemetery, together with the foundations of a mosque, and an even more earlier Roman period remains are located at Triq Dicembru 13, Marsa.

=== British period: 1800-1964 ===
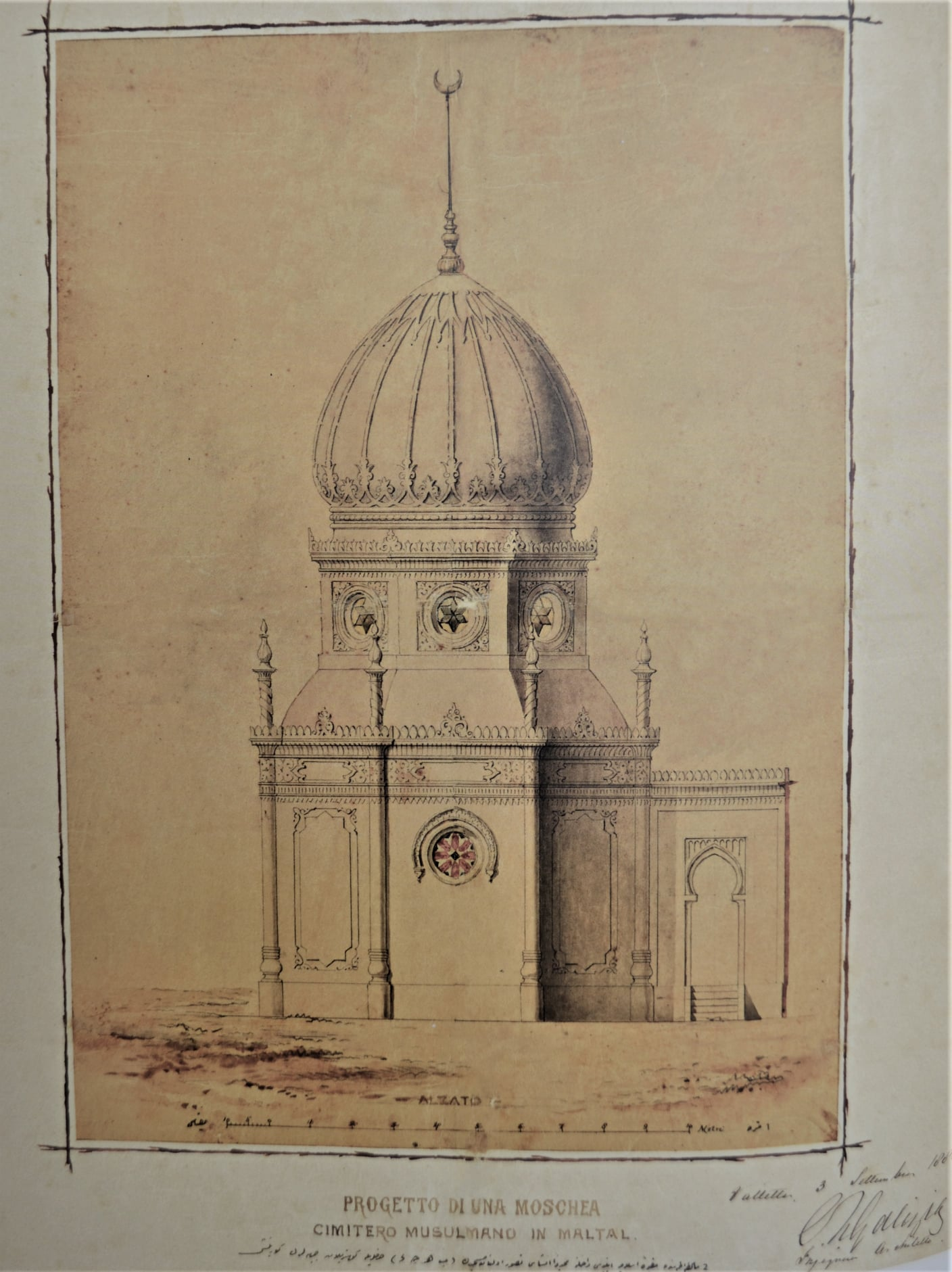
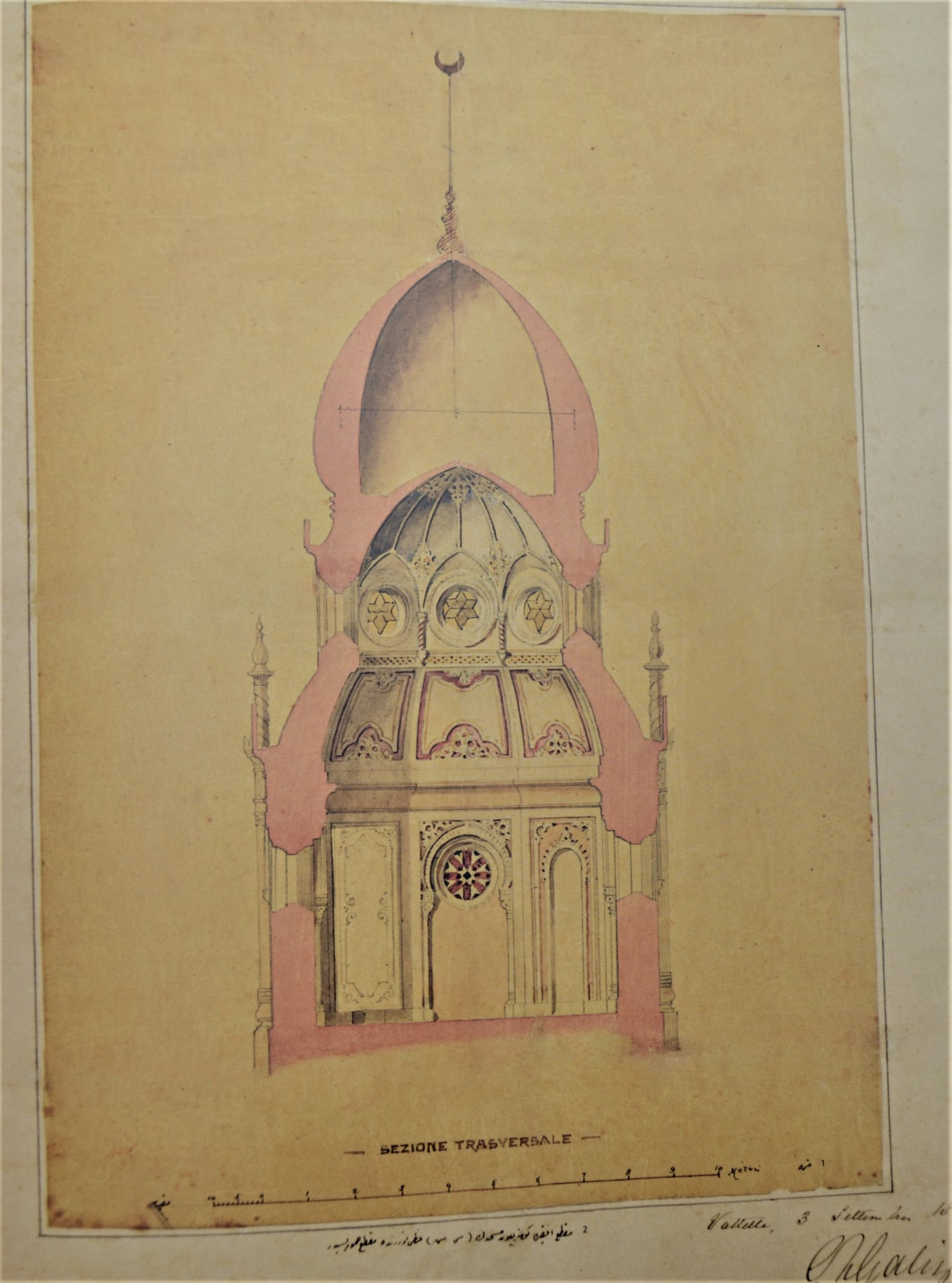
1884 Project for a mosque at the Turkish Military Cemetery, by Emanuele Luigi Galizia (never built)

The 17th-century cemetery at Spencer Hill had to be relocated in 1865 to make way for planned road works, with one tombstone dating to 1817 being conserved at the National Museum of Archaeology in Valletta.

A new cemetery was commissioned by the Ottoman sultan Abdülaziz, and it was constructed between 1873 and 1874 at Ta' Sammat in Marsa, as decided in 1871. Construction took over six months to complete. It was designed by the Maltese architect Emanuele Luigi Galizia in Moorish Revival architecture. The design for the project was unique in Maltese architecture at that point. Galizia was awarded the Order of the Medjidie by the Ottoman sultan for designing the Turkish cemetery, and thus was made a Knight of that order.

At the end of the 19th century the cemetery became a landmark by its own due to its picturesque architecture. Due to the absence of a mosque at the time, the cemetery was generally used for Friday prayers until the construction of a mosque in Paola. The small mosque at the cemetery was intended to be used for prayers during an occasional burial ceremony, but the building and the courtyard of the cemetery became frequently used as the only public prayer site for Muslims until the early 1970s.

A properly sized mosque was designed by Galizia but the project was abandoned. The plans are available in Turkish archives in Istanbul which hold the words “Progetto di una moschea – Cimitero Musulmano“ (Project for a mosque – Muslim Cemetery). A possible reason for shelving the project was the economic situation and political decline of the Ottoman Empire. The place became too small eventually for the growing Muslim community.

=== Independent Malta ===
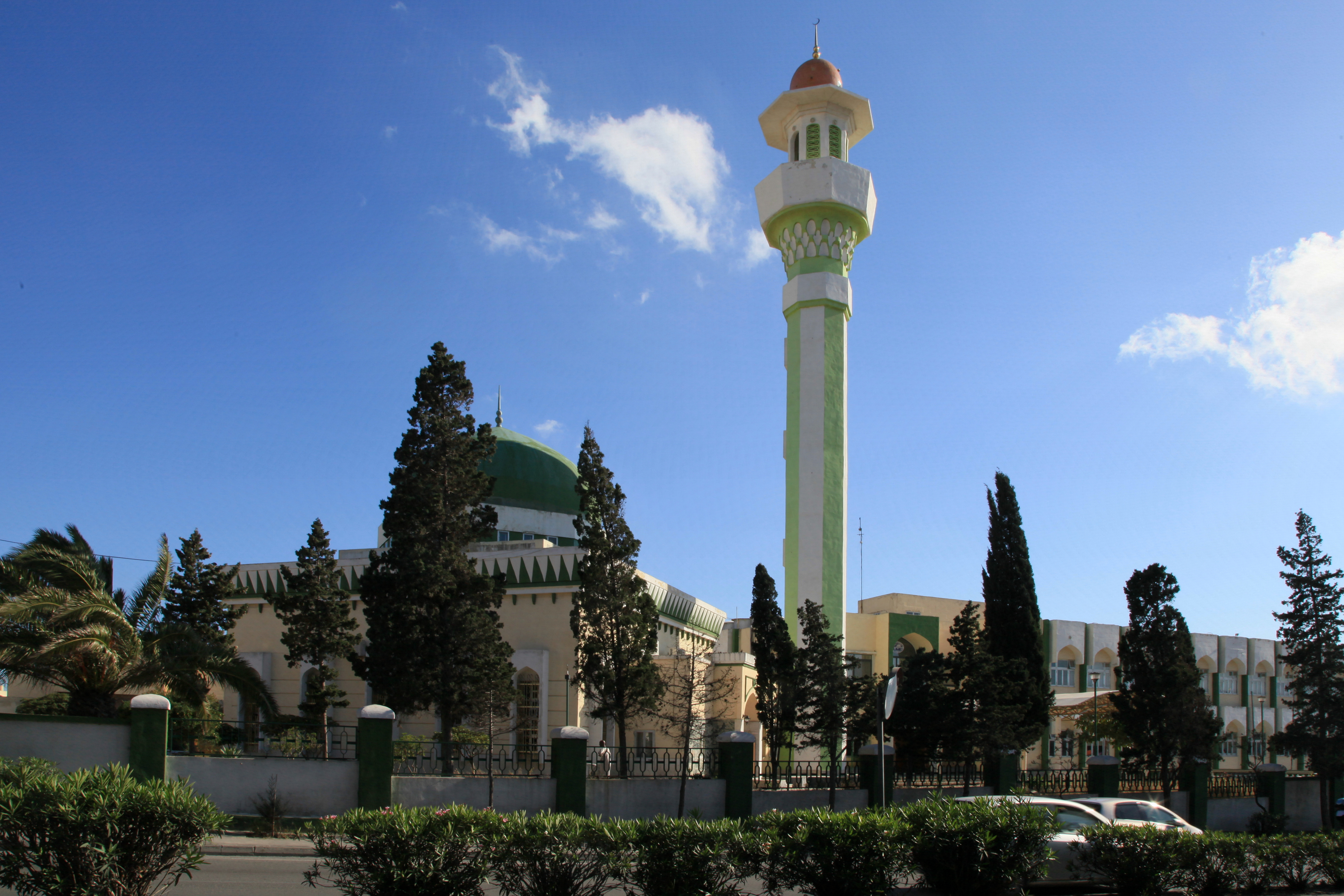
Mariam Al-Batool Mosque in Paola

In modern times, Malta's unique culture has enabled it to serve as Europe's "bridge" to the Arab cultures and economies of North Africa.

After independence from the United Kingdom in 1964, Libya became an important ally of socialist Maltese leader Dom Mintoff. History books were published that began to spread the idea of a disconnection between the Italian and Catholic populations, and instead tried to promote the theory of closer cultural and ethnic ties with North Africa. This new development was noted by Boissevain in 1991:

...the Labour government broke off relations with NATO and sought links with the Arab world. After 900 years of being linked to Europe, Malta began to look southward. Muslims, still remembered in folklore for savage pirate attacks, were redefined as blood brothers.

Malta and Libya also entered into a Friendship and Cooperation Treaty, in response to repeated overtures by Gaddafi for a closer, more formal union between the two countries; and, for a brief period, Arabic had become a compulsory subject in Maltese secondary schools.

The Islamic Centre of Paola, was founded in 1978 by the World Islamic Call Society, together with a Muslim school called the Maryam al-Batool school. In 1984 the Mariam Al-Batool Mosque was officially opened by Muammar Gaddafi in Malta, two years after its completion.

Mario Farrugia Borg, later part of the personal office of Prime Minister Joseph Muscat, was the first Maltese public officer to take an oath on the Quran when co-opted into the Qormi local council in 1998.

In 2003, of the estimated 3,000 Muslims in Malta, approximately 2,250 were foreigners, approximately 600 were naturalised citizens, and approximately 150 were native-born Maltese.

In 2008, a second translation of Qur’an into Maltese by professor Martin Zammit was published. By 2010, there were approximately 6,000 Muslims in Malta—most of whom are Sunni and foreigners. (Note: The National Statistics Office (NSO) of Malta has never conducted a census that records the numbers of Muslims in Malta.)

The 2021 Census in Malta found that the Muslim population grew from 6,000 in 2010 to 17,454 in 2021, mainly foreigners, totalling 3.9% of the population.

== See also ==
- History of Malta
- History of Islam in southern Italy
- Siege of Malta (1429)
- Invasion of Gozo (1551)
- Great Siege of Malta
- Maymūnah Stone
- Turkish Military Cemetery
- Religion in Malta
