= Mariam Al-Batool Mosque =

Mosque in Paola, Malta

- مسجد مريم البتول il-Moskea
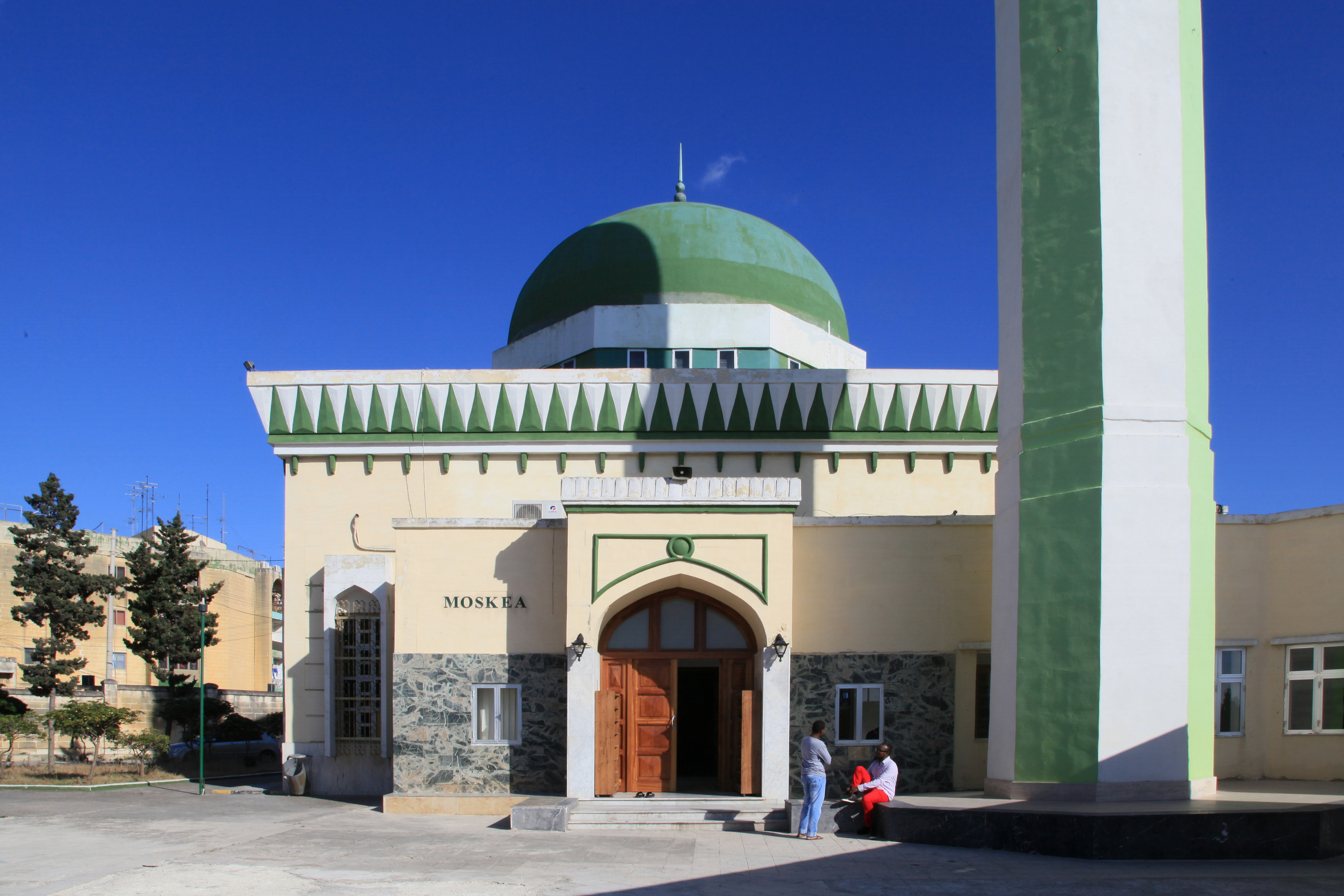

- Location within Malta

Religion
- Affiliation: Sunni Islam
- Ownership: Islamic Call Society
- Leadership: Imam(s): Mohammed Elsadi; Chairman: Imam Wagdi Nashnosh (Director)

Location
- Location: Paola, Malta
- Administration: Islamic Call Society
- Coordinates: 35.875897°N 14.508822°E

Architecture
- Architect: Mohammed Abid el-Soukri
- Type: Mosque
- Style: Islamic architecture
- General contractor: Gemco International Ltd. Co.
- Established: 1982
- Construction cost: £M 900,000

Specifications
- Capacity: 500 worshippers
- Interior area: 225 m^{2} (2,420 sq ft)
- Dome: 1
- Minaret: 1
- Minaret height: 31.5 m (103 ft)
- Materials: Limestone

Website
- mariamalbatool.com (Islamic Centre)

Mariam Al-Batool Mosque (Arabic: مسجد مريم البتول, lit. "The Virgin Mary Mosque", also known as Paola Mosque or Corradino Mosque) is a mosque located in Paola, Malta. The first stone of the mosque was laid by Libyan leader Muammar Gaddafi in 1978 and its doors were open to the public in 1982, and officiated in 1984. The initial scope of the building was to serve the Muslims in Malta, at the time mainly economic migrants from Libya, and to promote Sunni Islam among the Maltese society.

Even though there are a number of other Muslim places of worship in Malta, the Mariam Al-Batool Mosque is the only officially recognized and mosque-designed structure in the country, so it is colloquially referred to in Maltese as simply il-Moskea (lit. "the Mosque"). The building of others have been proposed.

== History ==
The mosque is built at Corradino Hill, close to the Corradino Lines and the Kordin III megalithic temple. The formerly public land, circa 6,700 square metres (0.0026 sq mi), was bought (or donated) from the Maltese government in 1975 which consisted of an undeveloped site. A full development application was accepted by the pertinent authorities on 16 April 1975. Construction on the mosque started in 1978 and finished in 1982 when it was opened to the public. The mosque was officially opened in 1984 by Muammar Gaddafi when Malta and Libya signed the Treaty of "Friendship and Cooperation". The mosque and Islamic centre were given diplomatic immunity by the Maltese Government. Muammar Gaddafi directly contributed to the project both by buying the land and by partly funding the construction of the mosque.

The mosque is found on the side of Dom Mintoff Road (formerly Corradino Road) and is administered by the World Islamic Call Society (WICS). It was built during Prime Minister Dom Mintoff's term in office during the first wave of economic negotiations between Malta and Libya. The Government of Malta, under Prime Minister Dom Mintoff, has also contributed to the building of the Mosque. The Mosque and the minaret cost roughly £M 900,000.

== Complex ==
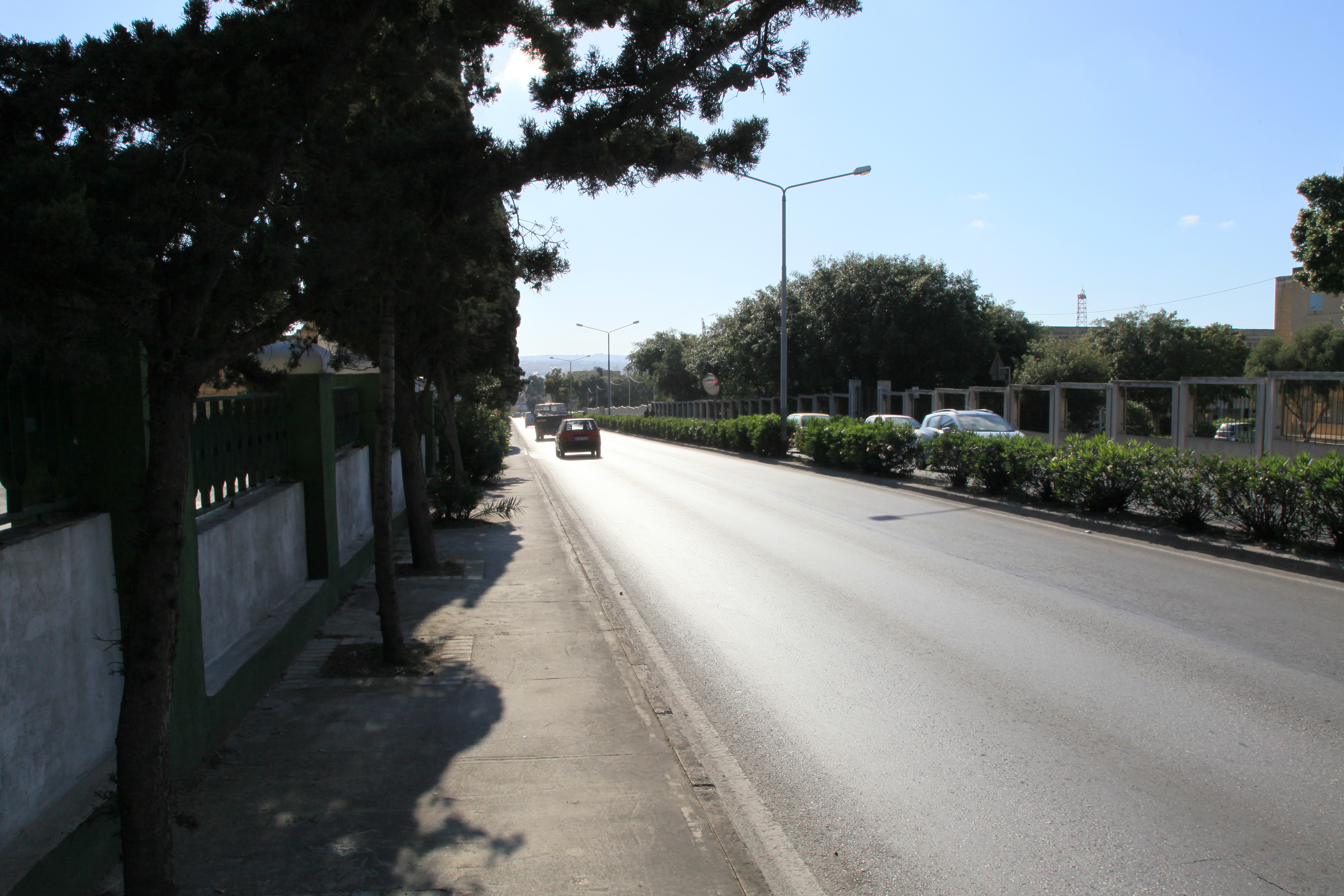
Dom Mintoff Road: Mosque Complex on the left, MCAST to the right

The Mosque is found in an Islamic complex, referred to as the Mosque complex, called the Islamic Centre in Malta. The complex also consists of a school, the Mariam Al-Batool School, the Islamic Cultural Centre (Ċentru Kulturali Islamiku), a courtyard, the Imam's house, The Malta Islamic Cemetery (Iċ-Ċimiterju Islamiku f'Malta) and the Mediterranean Garden.

The latter is situated on public land, next to the mosque complex. It was originally called Gaddafi Gardens, and it became known as Libyans' Garden after the Libyan Civil War. It was officially renamed to its present name in March 2016.

The Malta Islamic Cemetery is built on public land with permission granted by the Maltese government. There is a plan to build a secondary school for Muslim children at the back of the Mosque. The complex, specifically the mosque, has become symbolic of the revival of Islam in Malta, and been seen by some as the first wave of modern "Muslim invasion" and significantly it symbolizes 'Libya's bridge to Europe' specifically after the Lockerbie bombing.

The mosque and some of the buildings at the complex were built on the design of Libyan-born Architect Mohammed Abid el-Soukri.

== Governance ==
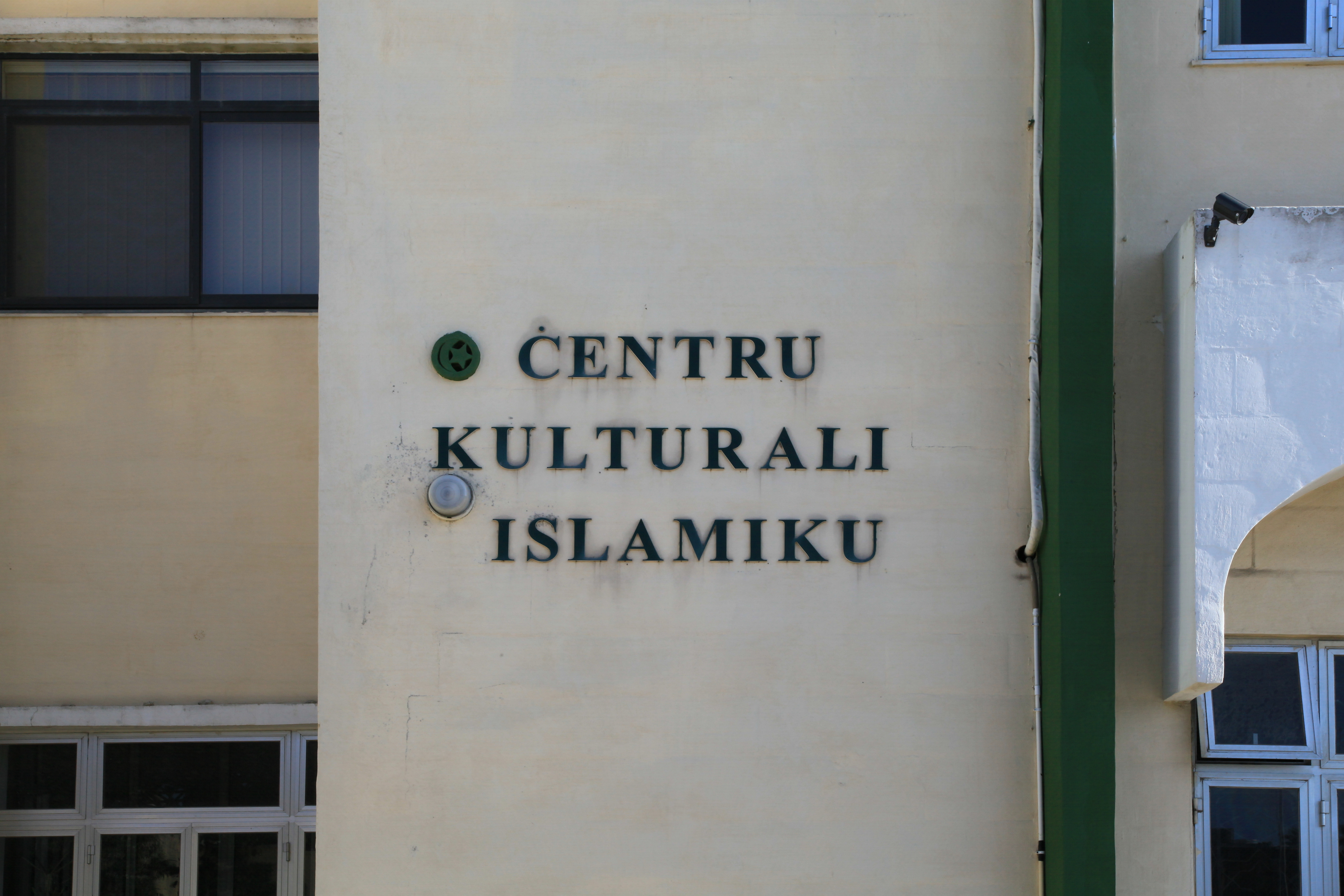
Islamic Cultural Centre, Paola

The Mosque is administered by members of the Muslim community and separate from the government of Malta. The main Imam of the Mosque is Mohammed Elsadi, known as "Ix-Xih" (literally meaning "the elder"). Elsadi was born to Palestinian refugees whom came to Malta because of the Arab-Israeli war. As a consequence El Sadi has obtained Maltese citizenship. Elsadi is described as a fundamentalist by Fr René Camilleri for supporting the strict compliance to sharia, but anthropologist Ranier Fsadni believes this is not a common belief among Muslims and that the Imam is "intellectually honest". Indeed, the consumption of alcohol, by Muslims in Malta, is a common practice that goes against the fundamental teachings of Islam.

The Islamic religious culture affairs is under the responsibility of Omar Ahmed Farhat. Muslims have the right to govern their religious environment issues in line with Maltese law and the government of Malta is sensitive about it. When the Mosque was inaugurated it was considered very large but today the mosque's religious service on its own has become too small to cater for the unforeseen growth of the Muslim community, mainly being foreigners.

Bader Zeina, a Palestinian migrant, is a separate Muslim organizer and leader of the Islamic Community Malta (ICM).

== Architecture and customs ==
The Mariam Al-Batool Mosque is the first Mosque in Malta to be built in modernity, with the most previous Mosque having been built in 1702 during the Order of St John for Turkish slaves within a prison building of which no traces remain and limited description of its construction. A street in Mdina, Triq Mesquita (Mesquita Street) and Piazza Mesquita, may have been named after a former Mosque that stood on site during the Arab period in Malta. However these were probably named after a former Governor of Mdina that was named Don Mesquita.

Most Islamic-related themes have been "eradicated from the national narrative."

On 21 April 1975 Libya bought a land area of 6,700 m^{2} (0.0026 sq mi) in Paola. The land was acquired to build a muslim centre according to Libyan customs designed by the Libyan architect Mohammed Abid Elshukri, who was the architect of the Mosque, the Islamic Cultural Centre and a terrace overlooking the original gardens where the school and the cemetery are found today. The project was entrusted to Gebco International Ltd. Co. under the supervision of Maltese engineer Alfred Balzan. The first stone was laid by Muammar Gaddafi on 2 July 1978 in a public ceremony. The Mosque was constructed with the use of Limestone, plastered, and painted in green, yellow and pink colors. The minaret became a landmark in Paola skyline since then, being the second highest building after the parish church until day, at 31.5 metres (103 ft) high.

=== Exterior ===
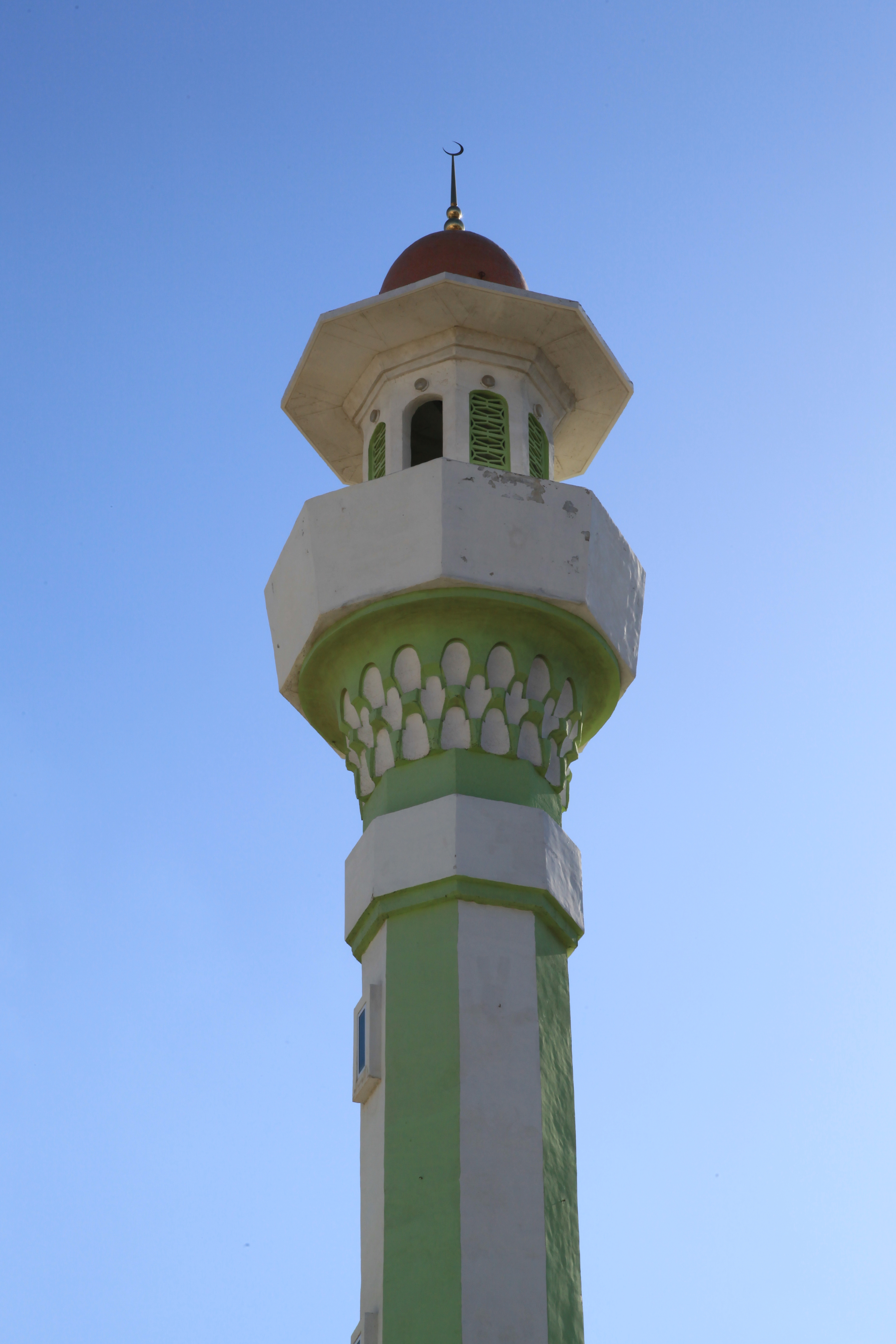
The minaret is a landmark in Paola. The whitewashing contrasts with the traditional colors of the mosque, after its refurbishment.

On the façade a plaque refers to the building simply as 'Moskea' that is a word in use in Maltese when referring to a Mosque. The shell structure of the Al-Batool Mosque is made of limestone while the arabic architecture is made of both limestone and wood. The mosque has one dome painted in green and one minaret that is a landmark in its own right by being visible from wide parts of the surroundings, and for this reason it is often used to explain directions.

The minaret has been recently restored, of which during restoration the flag of Libya was put to waive on it as a symbol of the downfall of Muammar Gaddafi, during the Libyan civil war. After the restoration the green color surface of the minaret was changed from dark green to light green could be observed, with the pink color being completely removed; while the mosque has had no recent restoration keeping the traditional colors since the inauguration by Gaddafi.

The mosque and the minaret are distinguished from the rest of Maltese architecture by adopting arabic masonry such as the building of the dome, the windows, an octagonal minaret, and the aesthetic use of eye-catching light colors from the exterior.

=== Interior ===
The interior consists mainly of the Islamic prayer hall in the form of sex segregation. Women have separate rooms next to the mosque of which entrance is from the back side, probable within the cultural centre building. An Islamic code of clothing is followed and provision for decent covering, mainly for women according to Muslim traditions, is available. Malta has no restrictions on Islamic dressing such as the veil (ḥijab) nor the full face veil (burqa and/or niqab) but strictly speaking face covering is illegal, however an official ban on face covering for religious reasons is ambiguous. However it is guaranteed that individuals are allowed to wear as they wish at their private homes and at the Mosque. Imam El Sadi has said that the banning of the niqab and the burka "offends Muslim women". Elsadi said that the Maltese's "attitude towards Muslim women" is positive and despite cultural clashes they tolerate their dressing. Some Muslim women share the belief that it is sinful to be seen in public without veiling themselves, however they are lawfully required to remove it when needed such as for photos on identifications. The mosque also consists of a washing room for the obligatory tradition of Muslims to wash themselves before prayers. A larger than usual Koran is displayed inside the mosque.

== Public policy ==
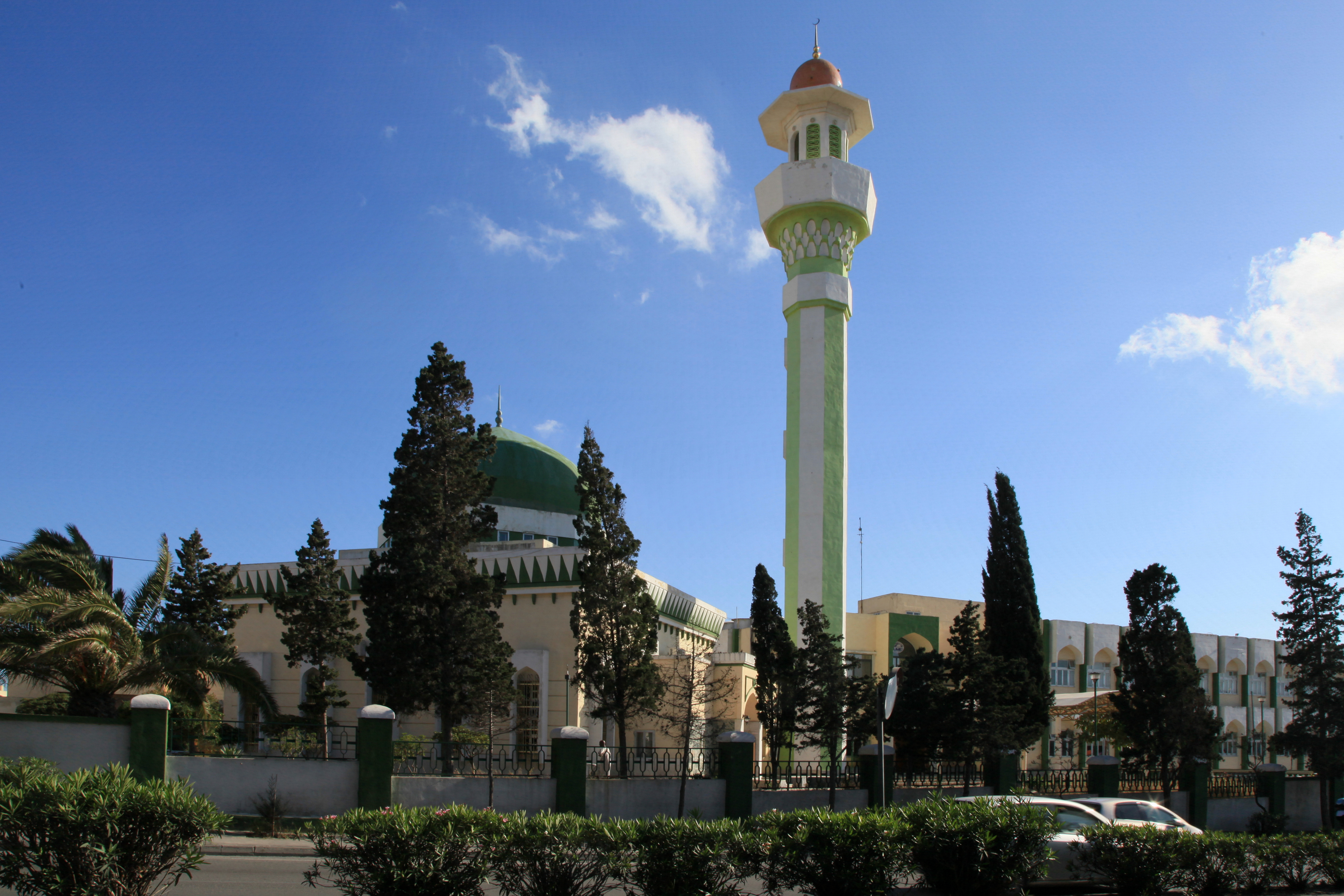
Mariam Al-Batool Complex as seen from MCAST

The mosque is open for the public, including non-Muslims, from 08:00 to 22:00. Traditional Friday prayers are held every Friday at 13:00. Conservative Muslim customs have to be respected, such as the removal of shoes before entering the mosque, men-only space and women-only space specifically during prayer time, and other Islamic-related customs.

=== Catering ===
According to Imam Mohammed el-Sadi, the Islamic centre issues certificates for each wedding that takes place on site but these are not considered legitimate by the state and are legally null. Wedding ceremonies are celebrated at the mosque, including interfaith ceremonies, but Muslim women are not welcomed to conduct their ceremonies at the mosque if they wed a non-Muslim, while non-Muslim women are told to raise their children as Muslims when marrying a Muslim man and advised before the ceremony takes place at the mosque. Imam El Sadi does not encourage mixed-faith marriages as the overwhelming majority of them fail. The mosque does not cater or welcome LGBT people and their rights, bringing some controversy in the Maltese political sphere.

=== Attendants ===
The mosque is visited by mainly Maltese Muslims, tourists, migrants and refugees. The Muslim community in Malta has increased from less than a hundred Muslims in 1974, to 3,000 Muslims in 2007, to 6,000 Muslims in 2011, to 10,000 Muslims in 2014. These estimates can be discredited as there has never been a proper conducted census about the Muslim population by the National Statistics Office (NSO Malta). There are about 18,000 refugees in Malta according to The Daily Telegraph with the overwhelming majority being males and Muslims.

In 2016 Ivan Vella said that there are up to 45,000 Muslims in Malta but this was also a conservative figure. With the fall of Muammar Gaddafi in Libya over 55,000 visas were issued for Libyan citizens, generally of Muslim faith, to live in Malta, between 2011 and 2015. However, these are, for the most of them, temporary visas for medical care or other reasons.

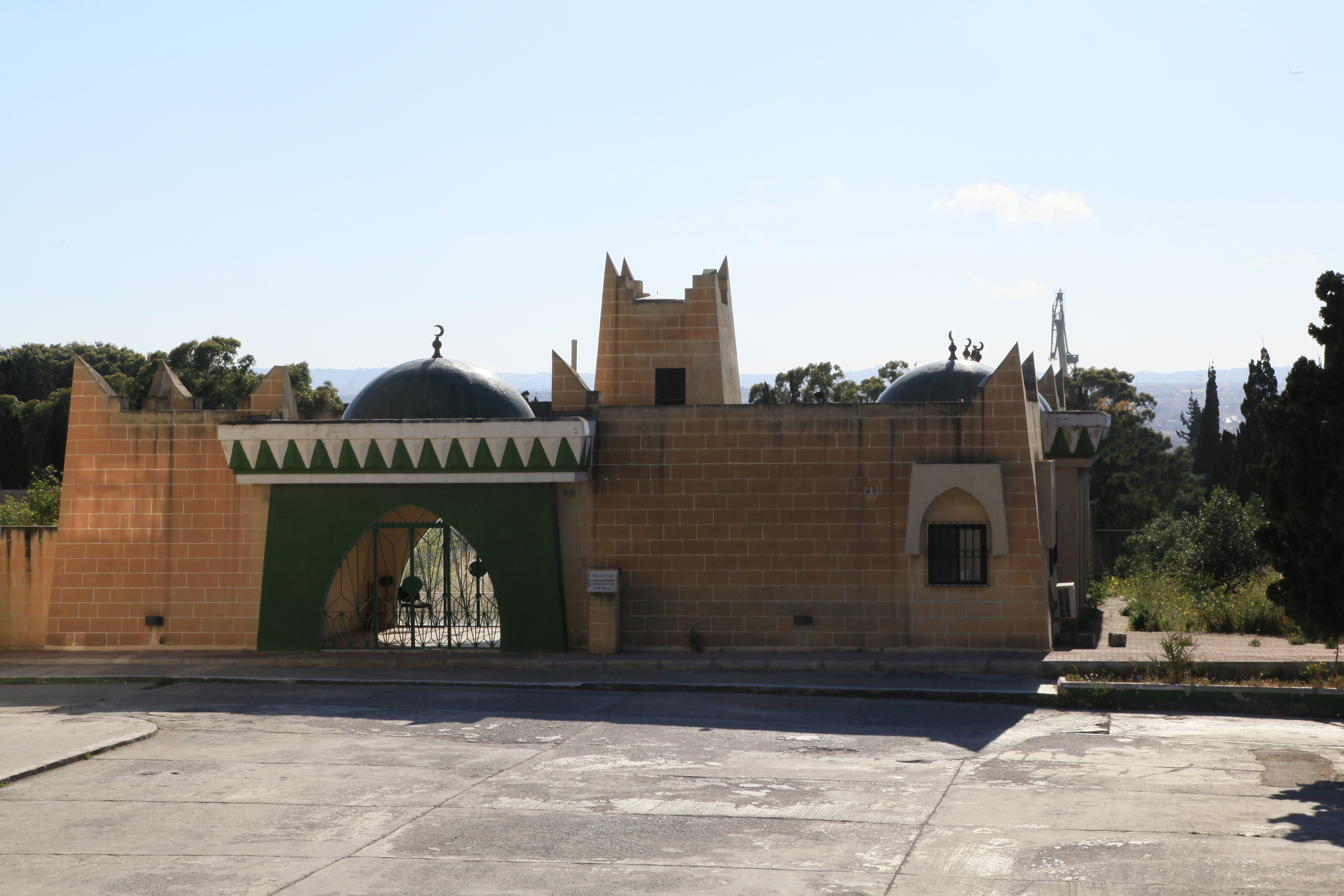
Entry to Mediterranean Garden (formerly Gaddafi Gardens) and The Malta Islamic Cemetery

The rapid growth of Muslims is mainly attributed to economic migrants, accompanied by interfaith marriages. Over 1,300 men are naturalized Maltese citizens mostly through marriage, and around 250 are native-born citizens of Malta. Around 350 Maltese citizens are reported to have converted to Islam, mainly Maltese women before or after marrying their Muslim husband; in general this is desired by Muslims to ensure that their children are raised "devout muslims". Maltese women are at times either "forced", pressured or persuaded to convert to Islam. Some muslim fathers have gone as far as taking their children away from their Maltese mothers, by taking them to their country of origin, with the scope to further ensure that they are raised as Muslims.

The mosque has become too small in the context of the growth of the Muslim population. Most of the attendants are from Libya, Somalia and Syria. The rise of crime among foreign Muslims, in Malta, is turning the mosque community into an isolated ghetto. Imam Elsadi himself said that the Muslim community aims not to "live in ghettoes". Some efforts by Maltese politicians have taken place to avoid this, such as by official visits.

=== Communication ===
The mosque makes the use of both Arabic as an Islamic tradition and English to communicate to the multicultural attendants. The loudspeaker at the mosque was shortly used to call for prayers but stopped after the nearby communities complained as the adhan unconventionally was used as early as 04:00 and disturbed public peace. The mosque is a seldom place of some conflict between non-nationals but mostly peaceful. The mosque's administration communicates to the public in general through their website mariamalbatool.com. Other forms of communication is participation in media discussion, such as on radio and on television, and occasional events such as conferences.

== Mosque-state relations ==
=== Official visits ===
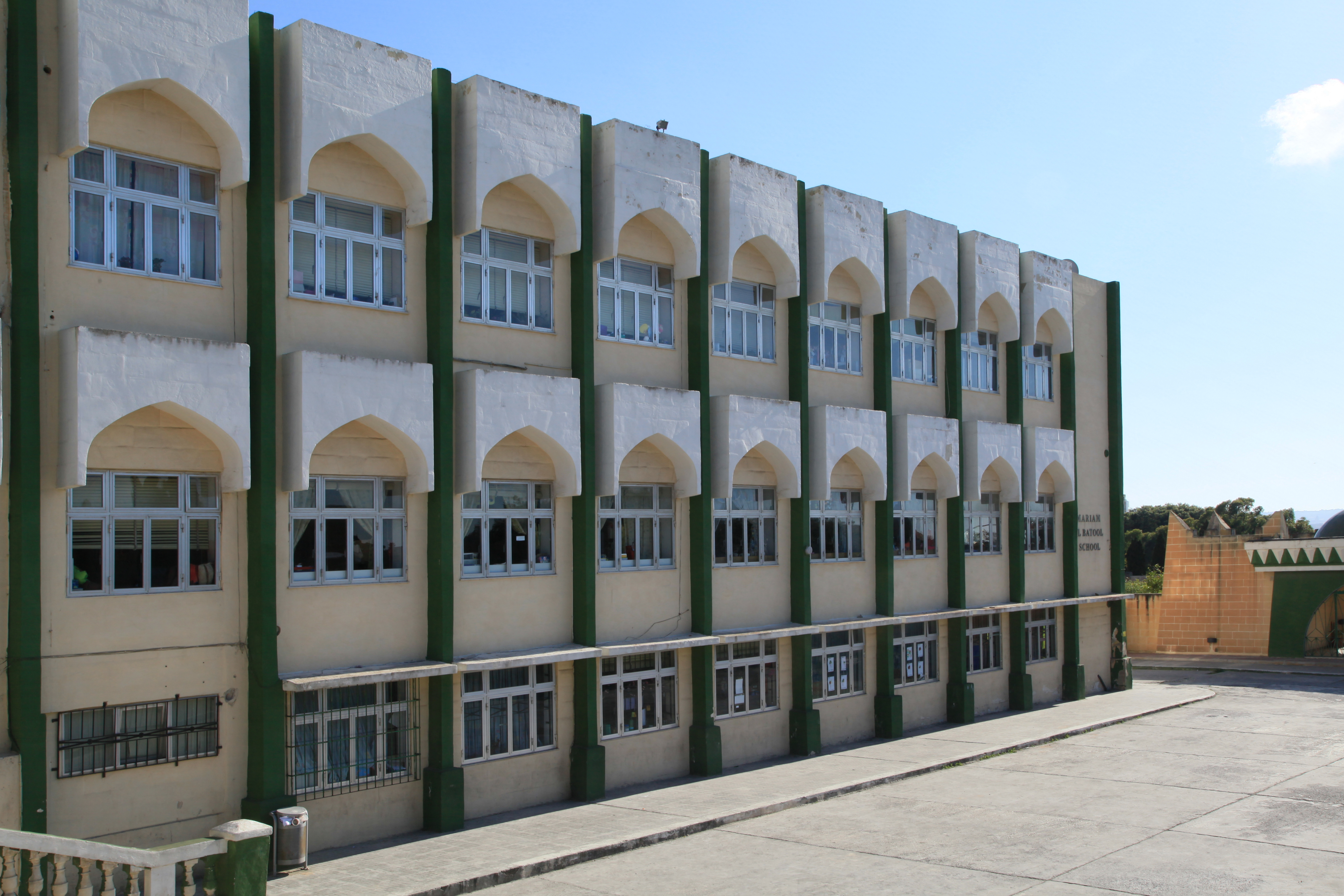
Mariam Al-Batool School is interconnected to the Mosque via the Islamic Cultural Centre

The then President of Malta George Abela has paid a visit to the Islamic centre in Paola in specific the Mariam Al-Batool School. Archbishop Paul Cremona has visited the mosque delivering prayers in it and on a different occasion he has also visited the Islamic Cultural Centre.

The Prime Minister of Malta Lawrence Gonzi was the first Maltese politician to have visited the mosque when discussions on the financial crisis situation of Mariam Al-Batool School were the main reason. The mosque was subsequently visited by the Prime Minister Joseph Muscat and US Ambassador to Malta Douglas Kmiec also in cause of the Mariam Al-Batool financial crisis. In 2015 the Mosque received a visit by the Qatari Ambassador for Malta Ali Alkhirgi together with Prime Minister Joseph Muscat to discuss for a possible plan to build another Mosque in the north of Malta.

=== Political activism ===
Imam El Sadi has pledged political support to both political parties sitting in the Maltese parliament (during the different visits of both prime ministers) on condition to improve the Islamic environment ranging from the building of new mosques, financing education at Mariam Al-Batool School, recognising Islamic traditions and others. However, according to Elsadi himself the Muslim community is a majoritarian Labour Party supporter. This is encouraged by Mario Farrugia Borg (a Muslim convert and former Nationalist Party supporter), who is a leader at the Islamic Centre and a secretariat of Prime Minister Joseph Muscat. The Nationalist Party is known in recent history that for several years referred to the Muslims as "tal-habbaziz" (literally refers to Northern African selling cyperus esculentus) which is a derogatory reference when referring to an Arab; this has contributed to make the mosque complex a ghetto and associating anything Arab with pessimist remarks, such as the Arabic language. However the party has been trying to be more inclusive to the muslim community in more recent years. Indeed, a meeting that was held with the muslim community to celebrate ifṭar was called by Imam Elsadi as a "historic" event. Political pressure from the mosque administration on the government of Malta has become common in the exchange of favors such as voting during elections.

== Alternative prayer houses ==
Apart from resolving the school financial crisis, most of the visits at the mosque are devoted to discuss the building of new Mosques. This is in the context that the Al-Batool Mosque is the only official Mosque in Malta, with more than fifteen other Muslims prayer houses scattered around the country such as; Birkirkara, Bugibba, Fgura, Ghaxaq, Marsa (Albert Town), Hal Safi (Open Centre), Pieta, St. Paul's Bay, San Gwann (Ta' Giorni), Sliema (Dar tal-Islam), Hal Far, Qawra, Msida, Zurrieq, and others.

Of these at least two prayer houses have legal permission by the Malta Environment and Planning Authority (MEPA) to operate as informal Mosques. The building of a Mosque in Marsascala at the American University of Malta (AUM) has been shelved for now. The Maltese government has provided for an interfaith room at Mater Dei Hospital that is the main public hospital in Malta. An interfaith centre of religious service consisting of a church, a mosque and a synagogue designed by Richard England was planned to be built in Xewkija, Gozo but after receiving local opposition to the project it remained shelved.

=== Situation ===
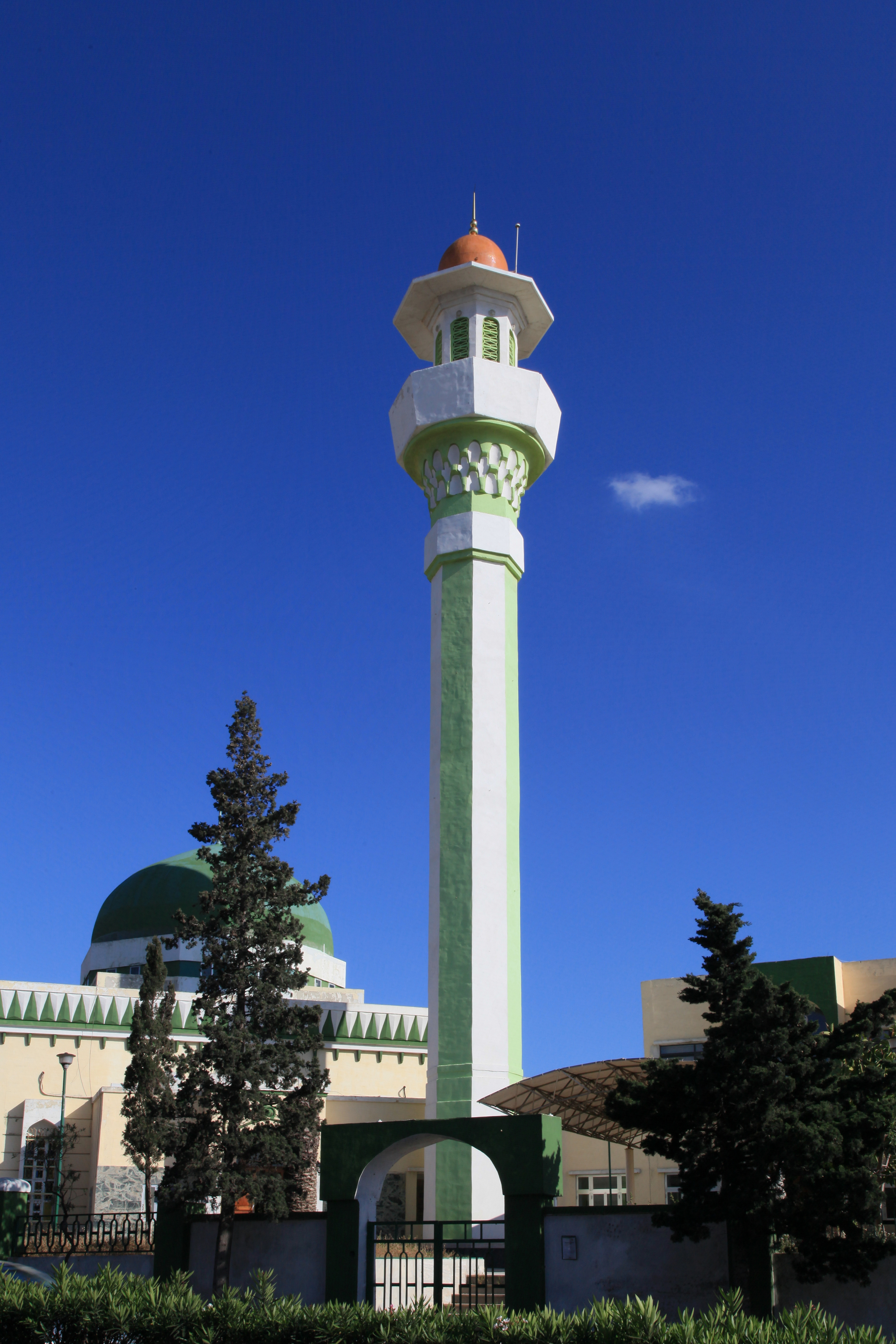

Some prayer houses that have not been granted legal permission to operate as Mosques were shut down and the Malta Security Services (MSS) is concerned about these settlements fearing some of these places may radicalize some Muslims and recruit youth converts that may threaten national security. In response to this Bader Zeina has taken a Muslim group to pray at Sliema waterfront to demand for the "fundamental human right" of worshipping gods both in private residences without legal restrictions and on public property. Zeina said that in the case of a backlash, coming from discrimination, "violence or revenge" may be expected.

The National Constitutional Court of Malta has said that even though individuals have the right to private property the use of such right has its limitations, and that there were no victims of discrimination as the law is proportional to everyone, with respect to freedom of assembly and freedom of expression, including freedom of religion. For this reason the court has noted that there was no breach of article 8 (1) of the European Convention of Human Rights (ECHR), which is in harmony with the Charter of Fundamental Rights of the European Union.

Following this, in January 2016 a male-only muslim group started to gather for Friday prayers in an open public place, in front of a Roman Catholic church, in Msida. These prayers were said to be considered, by organizer Bader Zeina, as also to be a form of protest for not having where to pray. The same organizer was previously involved in similar acts, such as in Sliema and Bugibba, when it became known that gathering and location were never the issues but rather the want of another place other than Mariam Al-Batool Mosque. Faced with similar crisis from the Muslim community, the Maltese Government made temporal arrangement for Islamic prayers in Floriana. The building known as the Ospizio, a former mental health hospital that is now hosting the prayers, is ideal as it is found right behind the national police headquarters in Malta.

Imam El Sadi has said that he is left uninformed about public prayers, organized by Zeina, and about any negotiations with the government. The Imam was not able to give his position about public prayers organised in Sliema and Msida as these were not his initiatives and he was neither informed of.

=== Religious freedom ===
The US embassy in Malta has stated that respect to religious freedom is guaranteed by the government of Malta and reports of "forced religious conversion" are absent. Mario Farrugia Borg, who works at the mosque, had stated that by being appointed as a personal secretariat at the Office of the Prime Minister (OPM) and being a Christian convert to Islam he does not observe any discrimination. Imam El Sadi describes the Maltese society as "generous and tolerant". However, when a former Muslim, Khaled Baarl, had announced publicly on Xarabank his conversion from Islam to Christianity he was discriminated by exclusion from the Muslim community, and threatened to death by Syrian refugees.

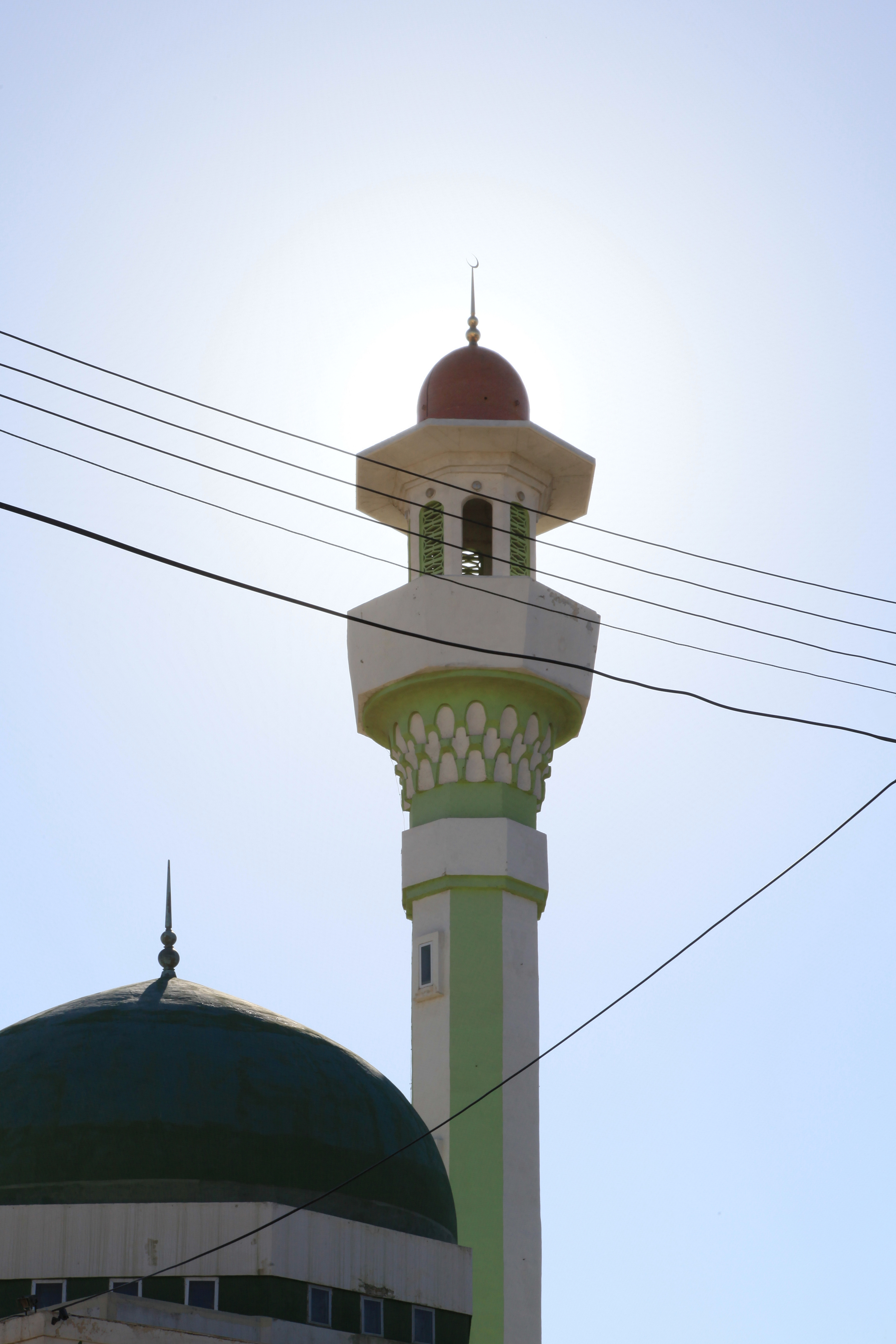
Dome and minoret

Prime Minister Joseph Muscat has some worrying reservations over "some groups" that promote radical sunni Islam in the form of salafism, and has largely relied on the Mariam Al-Batool Mosque's administration to help managing the crisis. The integration process of refugees within Maltese society has failed because of the large number of foreigners coming within a short period. Most refugees who arrive in Malta are from war-torn Islamic countries, some with fundamentalist ideologies, such as Libya, Somalia and Syria. Extremist remarks against western countries by muslims have been reported in the northern region of Malta. Mario Farrugia Borg, being a muslim himself, has called for drastic measures against "illegal migration". The European Court of Human Rights (ECtHR) has ruled against Joseph Muscat's opt for "pushback" of illegal migrants to Libya, despite the threat some refugees may present, as this goes against the fundamental human right principle of non-refoulement. Imam Elsadi has distanced himself from Islamic extremism but still supports fundamental principles of Islam. Elsadi does not believe there are threats of terrorism in Malta but does not rule out extremism sympathisers among the local Muslim community. The Armed Forces of Malta (AFM) have taken some precautions for this matter.

Laiq Ahmed Atif (the President of the Aḥmadiyya Muslim community in Malta, born in Pakistan) has said that even though Islam literally means peace, the action of some are far from being peaceful, and has called for the "need to reform" Islamic culture. He also adds that adherents to Islam "have a religious duty" to live in peace in Malta. He encouraged reforming the process of refugees' integration such as by teaching the Maltese language and Maltese culture. However Imam Elsadi has not conceded to the teaching of Maltese culture where it is contrary to Islamic traditions. Elsadi and Ahmed Atif have both condemned the Charlie Hebdo shooting that took place in January 2015. A protest was organised by the Muslim community right after Friday prayers in December 2015, at the Mariam Al-Batool Mosque, to distance themselves and the Islamic religion from any sort of terrorism, and was attended by around 100 Muslims. This further showed that during Friday prayers, when attendance should be at its peak, most Muslims are not attending the Al-Batool Mosque. According to Imam Elsadi, many Muslims in Malta are "ignorant" about Islam, and he argues that since many Muslims come from homogenous societies, they find it hard to accept diversity in Maltese society, even among other Muslim ethnic groups.

=== Context ===
For these reasons the Mariam Al-Batool Mosque has once again gained national notability in Malta, over similar controversies, since its inauguration by Muammar Gaddafi in 1984. In order to address such crisis the Maltese government and the Muslim society have agreed to seek the building of another mosque in Malta. If this materializes, the Mariam Al-Batool Mosque will no longer be the "only mosque in Malta".

== See also ==
- Islam in Malta
- Libya-Malta relations
- Religion in Malta
