= Farrugia =

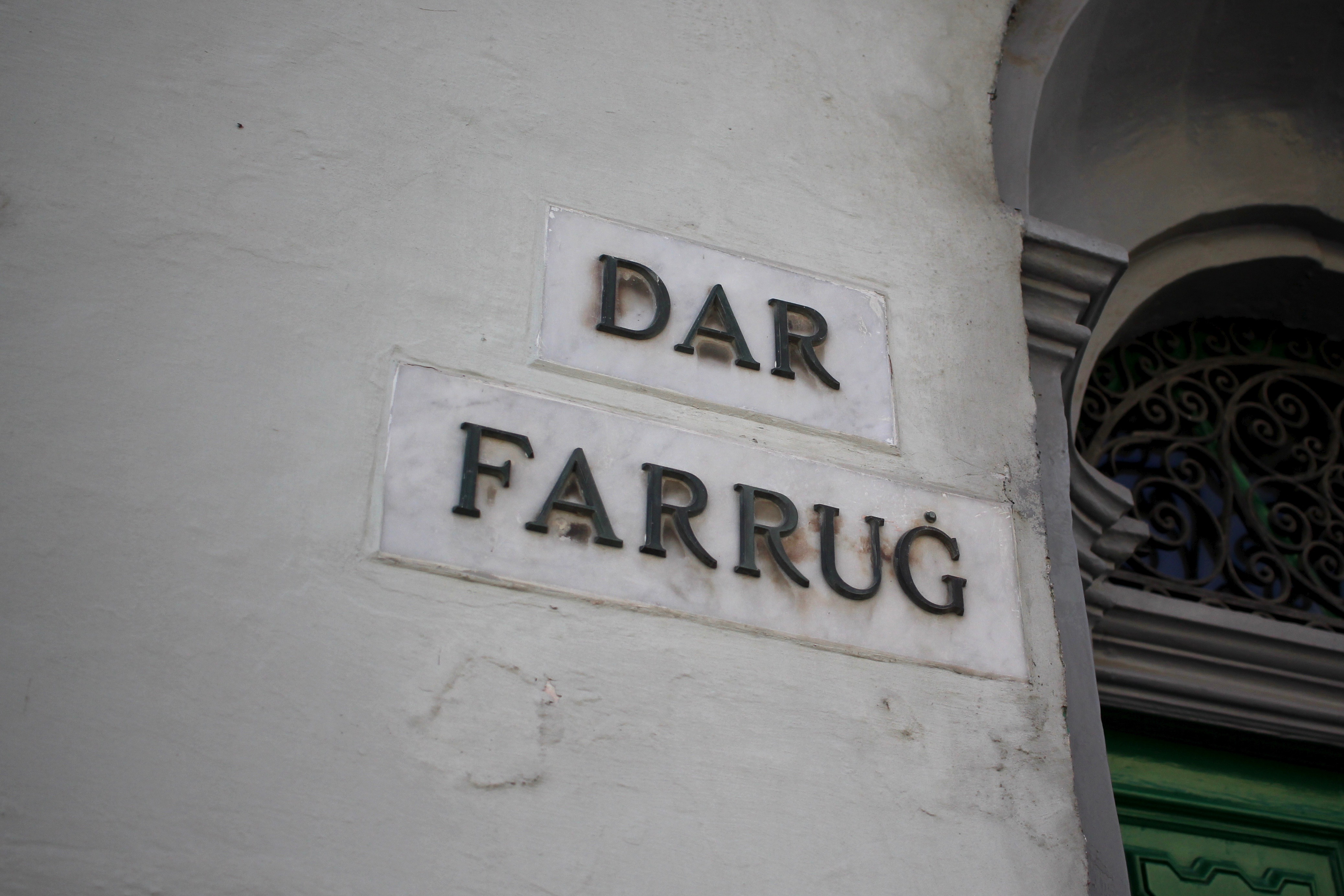
Dar Farruġ, a house name in Malta

Farrugia is a family name primarily found in Malta (where it is the fourth most common surname), Calabria and Sicily. Its purported etymology is based on either Latin ferula / Calabrian ferruggia ("staff, rod") or Arabic farrūj (meaning chicken in arabic) / Maltese farruġ ("cockerel, young rooster").

Early in the Middle Ages, individuals with this family name (or some variant) moved to the island of Malta from neighbouring Sicily. Many settlers were recorded from the end of the 19th century in the great migration from Italy to the New World. Usually arriving at Ellis Island, they settled in the eastern seaboard. The name has been exported to places including the United States, United Kingdom (specifically Wales and England), Australia, Canada, France and Russia.

Spelling variations of the name include Farruggia, Ferrugia, Ferruggio, Farruġa, Ferruggia, Farruggio and Farruj.

== People ==
Notable people with the surname Farrugia, or variants, include:

- Aaron Farrugia (born 1980), Maltese politician
- Amanda Farrugia (born 1985), Australian rules footballer
- Amelia Farrugia (born 1970), Australian opera soprano
- Angelo Farrugia (born 1955), Maltese politician
- Dominique Farrugia (born 1982), French actor, film director, screenwriter, producer and humorist
- Edwin Farrugia (born 1952), Maltese footballer
- Emanuel Farrugia (born 1957), Maltese footballer
- Francis Saviour Farrugia (18th century), Maltese philosopher
- Godfrey Farrugia (born 1960), Maltese politician and medical doctor
- Jean Paul Farrugia (born 1992), Maltese footballer
- Joe Julian Farrugia (born 1962), Maltese author, songwriter and broadcaster
- John Ferrugia (born 1951), American investigative reporter
- John Ferruggio (1925–2010), American in-flight director who led the evacuation of Pan Am Flight 93
- Johnston Farrugia (born 1980), known as Hooligan, Maltese rapper
- Joseph Farrugia (born 1954), Maltese Roman Catholic prelate, theologian and lecturer
- Joseph Farrugia (cyclist) (born 1955), Maltese cyclist
- Julia Farrugia Portelli, Maltese politician
- Leonard Farrugia (born 1956), Maltese footballer
- Louis Farrugia (1857–1933), Maltese theologian
- Maria Farrugia (born 2001), Maltese footballer
- Mario Farrugia (born 1955), Maltese footballer
- Mario Farrugia Borg (born 1970), Maltese diplomat
- Marlene Farrugia (born 1966), Maltese politician
- Michael Farrugia (born 1956), Maltese politician
- Nazareno Ferruggio (born 1981), Italian pianist
- Neil Farrugia (born 1999), French-born Irish footballer
- Nicolina Elizabeth Farruggia (1951–2019), known as Lena Farugia, American-born South African actress, screenwriter, director and producer
- Omar Farrugia, Maltese politician
- Paolo Rosario Farrugia (1836–1907), Maltese Roman Catholic prelate
- Ray Farrugia (born 1955), Maltese football coach
- Shaun Farrugia (born 1996), Maltese singer and songwriter
- Sonia Farrugia (born 1976), Maltese footballer
- Stefania Farrugia (born 1991), Maltese footballer
- Stephen Farrugia (born 25 April 1964), Maltese judoka
- Tony Farrugia, Maltese strongman

== See also ==
- Ħal Farruġ, hamlet in southeastern Malta
