= Stéphane Mifsud =

French free diver and five time world champion in static apnea

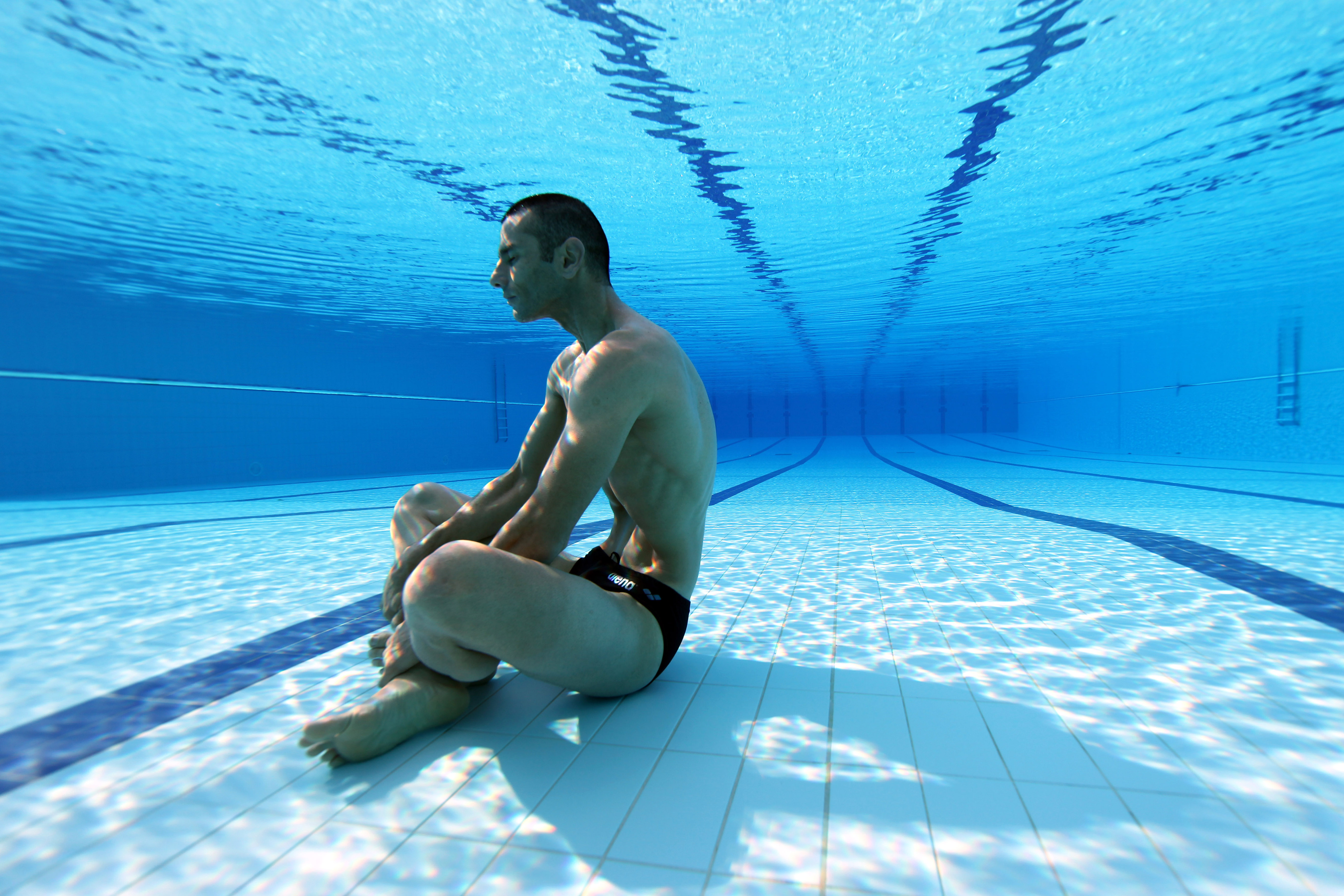
Stéphane Mifsud - Piscin.

Stéphane Mifsud (born 13 August 1971 in Istres) is a French free diver. He is five times world champion in static apnea (breath holding). His lung capacity was measured at 10.5 litres.

His surname, Mifsud, is of Maltese origin.

== Personal best ==
- Static apnea: 11 minutes 35 seconds on 8 June 2009 (AIDA World Record at the time)
- Dynamic apnea without fins - 131 m
- Dynamic apnea with fins - 213 m
