= History of religion in Malta =

This article details the history of religion in Malta. The Republic of Malta is a Southern European country consisting of an archipelago situated in the centre of the Mediterranean, 80 km south of Sicily, 284 km east of Tunisia and 333 km north of Libya, with Gibraltar 1,755 km to the west and Alexandria 1,508 km to the east. Malta covers just over 316 km2 in land area, making it one of the world's smallest states. It is also one of the most densely populated countries worldwide. Catholicism is the official religion in Malta as declared by the Maltese constitution.

== Prehistory and the classical era ==
Starting from around 3600 BC, Malta passed through a "temple period" which saw the construction of structures tied with religious beliefs such as the Ġgantija temple on Gozo (the "Ġgantija phase" between 3600 and 3200 BC), the Hypogeum (the "Saflieni phase" between 3300 and 3000 BC) and the Tarxien Temples, Ħaġar Qim and Mnajdra (the "Tarxien phase" between 3150 and 2500 BC). Fertility rites were probably the religious practices at these sites.

== Arrival of Christianity ==
Catacombs in Rabat testify to an early Christian community in Malta. The Acts of the Apostles tells the story of how Paul of Tarsus was shipwrecked in Malta on his way from Caesarea Maritima to Rome, sent by Porcius Festus, procurator of Judea, to stand trial before the Emperor. Paul ministered in Malta for three months (Acts 28:1–11).

According to tradition, Publius, the Roman Governor of Malta at the time, became the first Bishop of Malta following his conversion to Christianity. His episcopate is said to have lasted thirty-one years before facing martyrdom in Greece.

There is scant information about the continuity of Christianity in Malta in subsequent years although tradition has it that there was a continuous line of bishops from Publius to the time of Emperor Constantine. The Acts of the Council of Chalcedon record that, in 451 AD, a certain Acacius was Bishop of Malta (Melitenus Episcopus) and in 501 AD, a certain Constantinus, Episcopus Melitenensis, was present at the Second Council of Constantinople. In 588 Tucillus, Miletinae civitatis episcopus, was deposed by Pope Gregory I and his successor, Trajan, was elected by the clergy and people of Malta in 599 AD. The last recorded Bishop of Malta before the Arab invasion was a Greek by the name of Manas, who was subsequently incarcerated in Palermo. Under the Arab occupation, the native Christians were allowed freedom of religion but had to pay jizya.

The Normans relieved Sicily and the Maltese Islands in 1091 and Roger I of Sicily was warmly welcomed by the native Christians.

The Jewish population of Malta reached a peak in the Middle Ages under Norman rule, which began in 1090, with 500 living on the main island and 350 on Gozo. The medieval Jewish kabbalist Abraham Abulafia escaped persecution in Sicily and fled to Malta. He died on the tiny island of Comino, in the 1290s.

In 1479, Malta and Sicily came under Aragonese rule and the Alhambra Decree of 1492 forced all Jews to leave the country with only a few belongings. Several dozen Maltese Jews may have converted to Christianity in order to be able to remain in the country. A Jewish subculture re-emerged in Malta during the reign of the Knights Hospitaller.

== Sovereignty of the Order ==
While the islands of Malta were under the dominion of the Knights Hospitaller, from the 15th century through to the late 18th century, the Grand Master had the status of a Prince of the Church and enjoyed a special relationship with the Pope, which occasionally led to a considerable amount of friction with the local bishops.

== French occupation ==
Over the years, the power of the Knights declined, and the Order became unpopular. This was around the time when the universal values of freedom and liberty were incarnated by the French Revolution. People from both within and outside the Order appealed to Napoleon to oust the Knights. He did not hesitate. His fleet arrived in 1798, en route to the French invasion of Egypt and Syria. As a ruse, Napoleon asked for safe harbour to resupply his ships and then turned his guns against his hosts once safely inside Valletta. Grand Master Ferdinand von Hompesch zu Bolheim capitulated, and Napoleon entered Malta.

During his very short stay (six days), he accomplished quite a number of reforms, notably the creation of a new administration with a Government Commission, the creation of twelve municipalities, the setting up of a public finance administration, the abolition of all feudal rights and privileges, the abolition of slavery and the granting of freedom to all Turkish slaves. At the judicial level, a family code was enacted, and 12 judges were nominated. Public education was organised along principles laid down by Bonaparte himself, providing for primary and secondary education. Fifteen primary schools were founded, and the university was replaced by an 'École centrale', in which there were eight chairs, all very scientific in outlook: notably, arithmetic and stereometry, algebra and stereotomy, geometry and astronomy, mechanics and physics, navigation, chemistry, etc. Napoleon then sailed for Egypt, leaving a substantial garrison in Malta.

Within months, the French began closing convents and seizing church treasures. The Maltese people rebelled, and the French garrison of General Claude-Henri Belgrand de Vaubois retreated into Valletta. After several failed attempts by the locals to retake Valletta, they asked the British for assistance. Rear Admiral Lord Horatio Nelson decided on a total blockade, and in 1800 the French garrison surrendered.

== British Empire ==
In 1814, Malta became part of the British Empire in accordance with the Treaty of Paris. British rule lasted 150 years until 1964 when Malta gained independence and brought the first sizeable population of members of the Anglican church and other Protestant denominations. From 1815 to 1820, the Anglican missionary William Jowett of the Church Missionary Society based his Mediterranean Mission in Malta.

British colonial administration, however, continued to show respect and deference towards Maltese Catholic customs. The situation also led to the emergence of a small population of Catholics of British and Irish origin in Malta.

== Establishment of the Diocese of Gozo ==
Historically part of the Diocese of Malta, Gozitans submitted several petitions for the creation of an independent diocese, including in 1798 during the French occupation and again in 1836. A third petition, brought directly to Pope Pius IX in 1855, was successful. Instrumental in this effort were a young priest named Don Pietro Pace, who would several years later serve as Bishop of Gozo, and Adrian Dingli, Crown Advocate. The British Colonial Office signalled its approval in October 1860.

In 1863, Archpriest Michele Francesco Buttigieg was elected Auxiliary Bishop of Malta with instructions to reside in Gozo. One year later, on September 16, 1864, the Pope issued a Bull entitled Singulari Amore ('With remarkable Love'), which decreed that the Islands of Gozo and Comino were separated from the Diocese of Malta. On September 22, 1864, Bishop Buttigieg was elected the first bishop of Gozo, with the mother church in Victoria, dedicated to the Assumption of Mary (Maltese: "Marija Assunta"), serving as his Cathedral.

To this day, there are two episcopal jurisdictions: the Archdiocese of Malta and the Diocese of Gozo.

== See also ==
- Christianity in Europe
- Culture of Malta
- Freemasonry in Malta
- History of religion in Europe
- History of the Jews in Malta
- List of Churches in Malta
