= Louis Farrugia =

Maltese Catholic priest and philosopher (1857–1933)

- Born: 1857; Valletta, Malta
- Died: 1933 (aged 75–76)
- Occupation: Philosophy

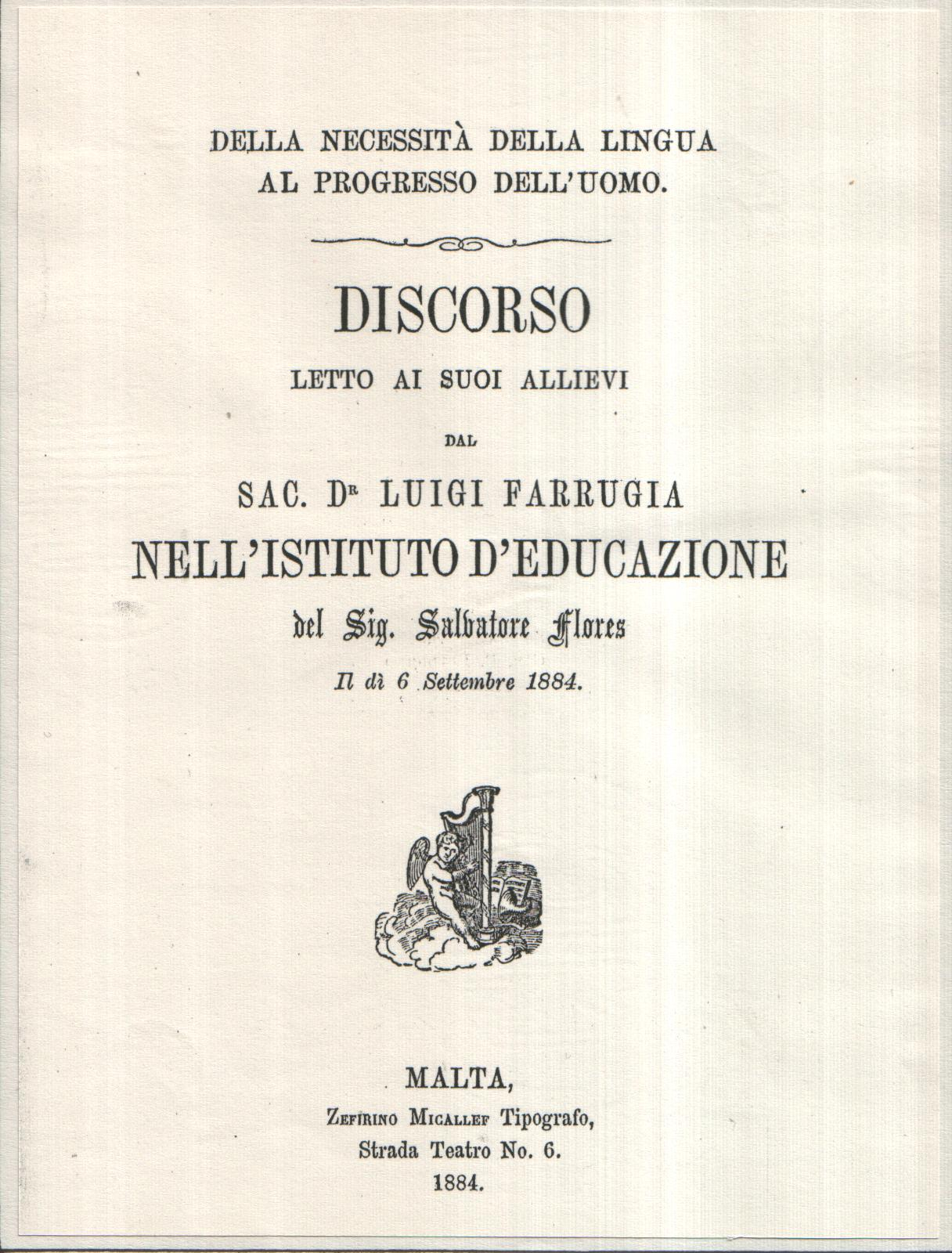
Della Necessità della Lingua al Progresso dell’Uomo (1884) by Louis Farrugia

Louis Farrugia (1857–1933) was a Maltese theologian and minor philosopher. In philosophy he was mostly interested in Scholasticism and literature. No portrait of him has been identified up till now.

== Life ==
Farrugia was born at Valletta, Malta, in 1857. After becoming a diocesan priest, he occupied various high offices both in the local Catholic Church and at the University of Malta. His ecclesiastical services were recognised by more than one Pope. He was also private secretary to the Bishop of Malta, Peter Pace, and President of the Ecclesiastical Tribunals in Malta.

Academically, Farrugia taught Latin at the local Lyceum for many years, and taught also philosophy and theology at the bishop’s minor seminary and at the University of Malta. At the university, Farrugia was also appointed Member of the General Council for six consecutive times.

Farrugia died in 1933 at 76 years of age.

== Works ==
Farrugia published more than fifty works. Most of them are of a religious or devotional nature with no interest to philosophy. Two publications, however, are of some philosophical value, namely the following:

- 1884 – Della Necessità della Lingua al Progresso dell’Uomo (On the Need of Language for the Progress of Man). A 20-page pamphlet in Italian published in Malta (Zefirino Micallef Tipografia) in which Farrugia elaborates on various literary themes around the concept of human progress. The work reproduces a talk given by Farrugia on September 6, 1884, at Flores College, Valletta. Throughout the talk he cites various authors, such as Dante, Manicino, Soave, Blames and others.
- 1895 – De Scholastica et Præsertim Thomistica Philosophia (On Scholasticism and Particularly on Thomistic Philosophy). A 16-page pamphlet in Latin published in Malta (Emm. Laferla) dedicated to adolescentibus clericus (young clerics). In this short work Farrugia systematically presents a brief exposition of the Aristotelico-Thomist Scholastic system of philosophy.

== Sources ==
- Mark Montebello, Il-Ktieb tal-Filosofija f’Malta (A Source Book of Philosophy in Malta), PIN Publications, Malta, 2001.

== See also ==
- Philosophy in Malta
