= Francis Saviour Farrugia =

Maltese philosopher, doctor of law and legislator

- Born: Malta
- Occupation(s): Jurist, Penologist, Philosophy

Francis Saviour Farrugia (18th century) was a minor Maltese philosopher, doctor of law, and legislator. He specialised in jurisprudence (the philosophy of law).

== Life ==
Unfortunately it is yet not known in what year Farrugia was born or died. Nor from which town or city in Malta he hailed.

As an academic and intellectual, Farrugia was held in very high regard by his peers. This was particularly so with the Grand Master of the Knights Hospitallers, Emmanuel de Rohan-Polduc, who had full confidence in his erudition and expertise.

At some time or other, Farrugia was a judge in the courts of appeal, a magistrate at the (Clistania) prisons, a magistrate of arms, a Councillor of the Supreme Tribunal for Justice, and assessor of the Maritime Consulate. These offices attest to the esteem he enjoyed and the favour with which he was bestowed by the government of the Knights Hospitallers.

Undoubtedly, Farrugia was a staunch traditionalist. This may be clearly seen in his only extant philosophical work, Discorsi Accademici (1775), in which, amongst other matters, he justifies and defends the use of torture, in the investigative and compilatory phase of a judicial case as much as a penalty. Though he seems to have taken note of the advances made in jurisprudence – especially that by Cesare Beccaria in his 1764 work On Crimes and Punishment – Farrugia evidently did not agree with them. Not so Grand Master Emmanuel de Rohan-Polduc, who, in 1784, was one of the first European princes to abolish the penalty of torture.

== Works ==
- 1775 – Ragguaglio della Gloriosa Esaltazione al Gran Magistro di S.A.Sma. Fra Don Emmanuele De Rohan (Report on the Elevation to Grand Master of H.R.H. Bro. Emmanuel De Rohan). The work is a diary of events which led to the election of Emmanuel de Rohan-Polduc to the office of Grand Master of the Knights Hospitallers. Though interesting in itself, it has no philosophical value.
- 1778 – Discorsi Accademici (Academic Discussions). Written in Italian and published at the printing press of the Knights Hospitallers in Valletta, Malta, the book is made up of thirty-nine pages, and dedicated to Grand Master Emmanuel de Rohan-Polduc. It is divided into six parts, each discussing different philosophical themes, namely: (1) education, (2) law, (3) keeping the populace at peace and seeking its goodwill, (4) the success of a ruler, (5) just deserts and the use of torture, and (6) reward.

Basically, the work is a short treatise on the philosophy of punishment. Structurally, the fifth part is the main section of the book, around which all the other parts are organised. In this part Farrugia makes a strong appeal so that retribution be held as a rule of law, for, he states, it is after all the true spirit of the law. This leads him to justify torture. He did not deem torture to imply any philosophical contradiction. On the contrary. Though he considers the philosophical positions of those whom he calls ‘humanitarians’, Farrugia refutes them on the grounds of the retributive arguments which he expounds throughout the rest of his book.

== Sources ==
- Mark Montebello, Il-Ktieb tal-Filosofija f’Malta (A Source Book of Philosophy in Malta), PIN Publications, Malta, 2001.

== See also ==
- Philosophy in Malta
