= Mifsud =

Mifsud is a surname of Maltese origin. Notable people with the surname include:

- Adrian Mifsud (born 1974), Maltese footballer
- Anthony J. Mifsud, Maltese-Canadian actor, singer and songwriter who performs as Mif
- Carmelo Mifsud Bonnici (born 1960), Maltese politician, son of Ugo Mifsud Bonnici
- Daniel Mifsud (born 1983), Australian Idol contestant
- George Mifsud Chircop (1951–2007), Maltese linguist
- Giuseppe Mifsud Bonnici (1930–2019), Maltese Chief Justice and philosopher
- Immanuel Mifsud (born 1967), Maltese writer
- Jean Pierre Mifsud Triganza (born 1981), Maltese footballer
- Josef Mifsud (born 1984), Maltese footballer
- Joseph Mifsud (born 1960), Maltese academic
- Karmenu Mifsud Bonnici (1933–2022), former Prime Minister of Malta
- Ludovik Mifsud Tommasi (1796–1879), Maltese priest, educator and poet
- Michael Mifsud (born 1981), Maltese footballer
- Paul Mifsud, Maltese snooker player
- Paula Mifsud Bonnici, member of Parliament of Malta (2013–2017)
- Philip Mifsud (born 1971), Maltese architect and politician
- Sigmund Mifsud, Maltese musician and conductor
- Stéphane Mifsud (born 1971), French free-diver
- Steve Mifsud (born 1972), Australian snooker player
- Ugo Mifsud Bonnici (born 1932), former President of Malta
- Ugo Pasquale Mifsud (1889–1932), former Prime Minister of Malta
