= Fenech =

- Coat of arms of the Fenech family
- Pronunciation: Maltese: [ˈfɛnɛk]
- Language: Maltese

Origin
- Language: Arabic
- Derivation: fanak
- Meaning: "fox"

Fenech is a Maltese surname about whose origins there are several hypotheses. The most notable is the meaning of "rabbit", since fenek is rabbit in Maltese. This in turn comes from the Arabic word for fox, فنك (fanak, "fennec fox") which like the rabbit has large ears as its distinguishing feature and may have been confused during the development of the Maltese language, which is a descendant of the Siculo-Arabic dialect.

Notable people with the surname include

- Beppe Fenech Adami, Maltese politician
- Chantal Bondin, née Fenech (born 1980), Maltese footballer
- David Fenech (born 1969), French musician
- Eddie Fenech Adami (born 1934), Prime Minister of Malta
- Edwige Fenech (born 1948), Maltese-Italian actress and producer
- Francis Fenech (1892–1969), Maltese prelate who became a bishop in India
- Georges Fenech (born 1954), French politician
- Jeff Fenech (born 1964), Maltese-Australian boxer
- Louis E. Fenech, scholar of Punjabi and Sikh studies
- Mario Fenech (born 1961), Maltese-Australian rugby player
- Paul Fenech (born 1972), Maltese-Australian comedian
- Paul Fenech (footballer) (born 1986), Maltese footballer
- Ryan Fenech (born 1986), Maltese footballer
- Tonio Fenech (born 1969), Finance Minister of Malta
- Yorgen Fenech (born 1981), Maltese businessman
