= Mario Farrugia Borg =

Maltese politician and diplomat

His Excellency Mario Farrugia Borg
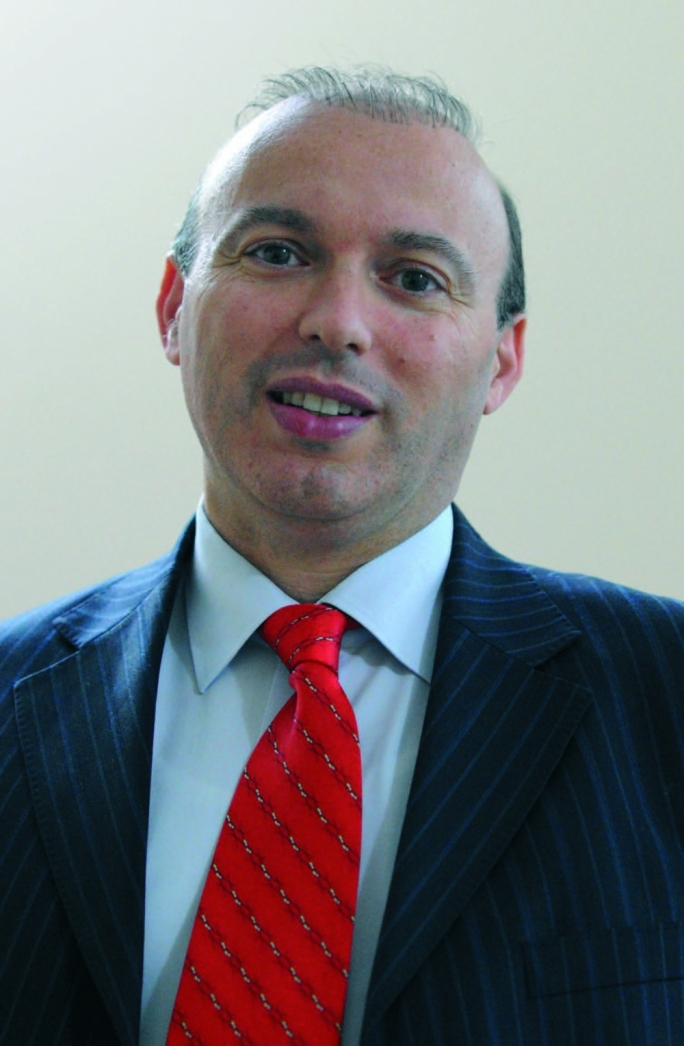
- High Commissioner of Malta to Australia and New Zealand
- Born: July 11, 1970 (age 56)

Mario Farrugia Borg is a Maltese diplomat and former politician who currently serves as the High Commissioner of Malta to Australia and New Zealand.

== Education and personal life ==
Mario Farrugia Borg was born on July 11, 1970, in Birkirkara, Malta. Mario completed tertiary education and started his professional career in the financial sector in 1990, working in foreign exchange and fund management until 2012. Mario has four children, Adam, Mariam, Sara and Grace.

== Career ==
=== Political career ===
Farrugia Borg was also active in the political scene in Malta for a number of years, having been elected and serving on the Qormi Local Council in 1997. In 2013, following the election of the Labour Party in Malta, Farrugia Borg was appointed as a member of the Prime Minister’s Private Secretariat under Dr. Joseph Muscat. He was assigned responsibilities related to the Prime Minister's relations with minorities and foreign communities in Malta, as well as customer care. In 2014, he contested the European Parliament elections in Malta on a Labour Party ticket.

=== Diplomatic career ===
In 2019, Farrugia Borg was appointed the consul general of Malta to Victoria, Australia. During his tenure, he worked with Maltese communities in Victoria. He served in this role from January 2019 to January 2021.

In January 2021, Farrugia Borg was appointed the high commissioner of Malta to Australia and New Zealand. On February 17, 2021, he presented his credentials to the governor-general of Australia, David Hurley, marking the commencement of his official duties as high commissioner. On September 7, 2021, he presented his credentials to the governor-general of New Zealand, Patsy Reddy.
