= History of the Jews in Malta =

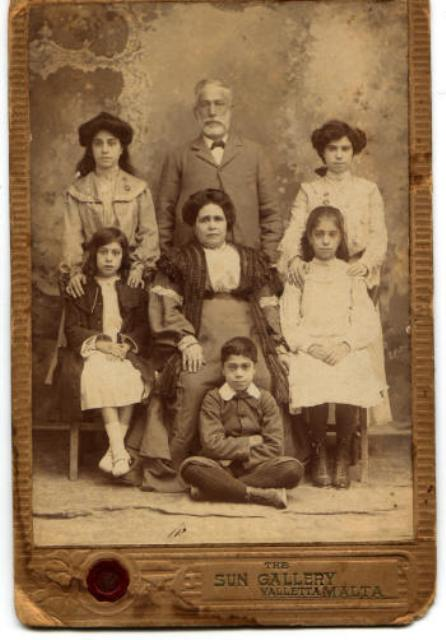
Cabinet photo of the family of Jacob Israel, from Corfu, and his wife Zula Zenzouri, from Sfax, taken in Valletta, circa 1900

The history of the Jews in Malta spans two millennia. A Jewish community is attested on the islands by the 4th-5th century. Jews prospered in Malta under Arab and Norman rule. They were expelled in 1492, and a community could only re-establish itself after 1798 under British rule. In the 19th and 20th century, the Jewish community in Malta welcomed refugees from Italy and Central Europe, escaping Nazi rule. Today, a small community remains well established on the islands.

== Antiquity ==
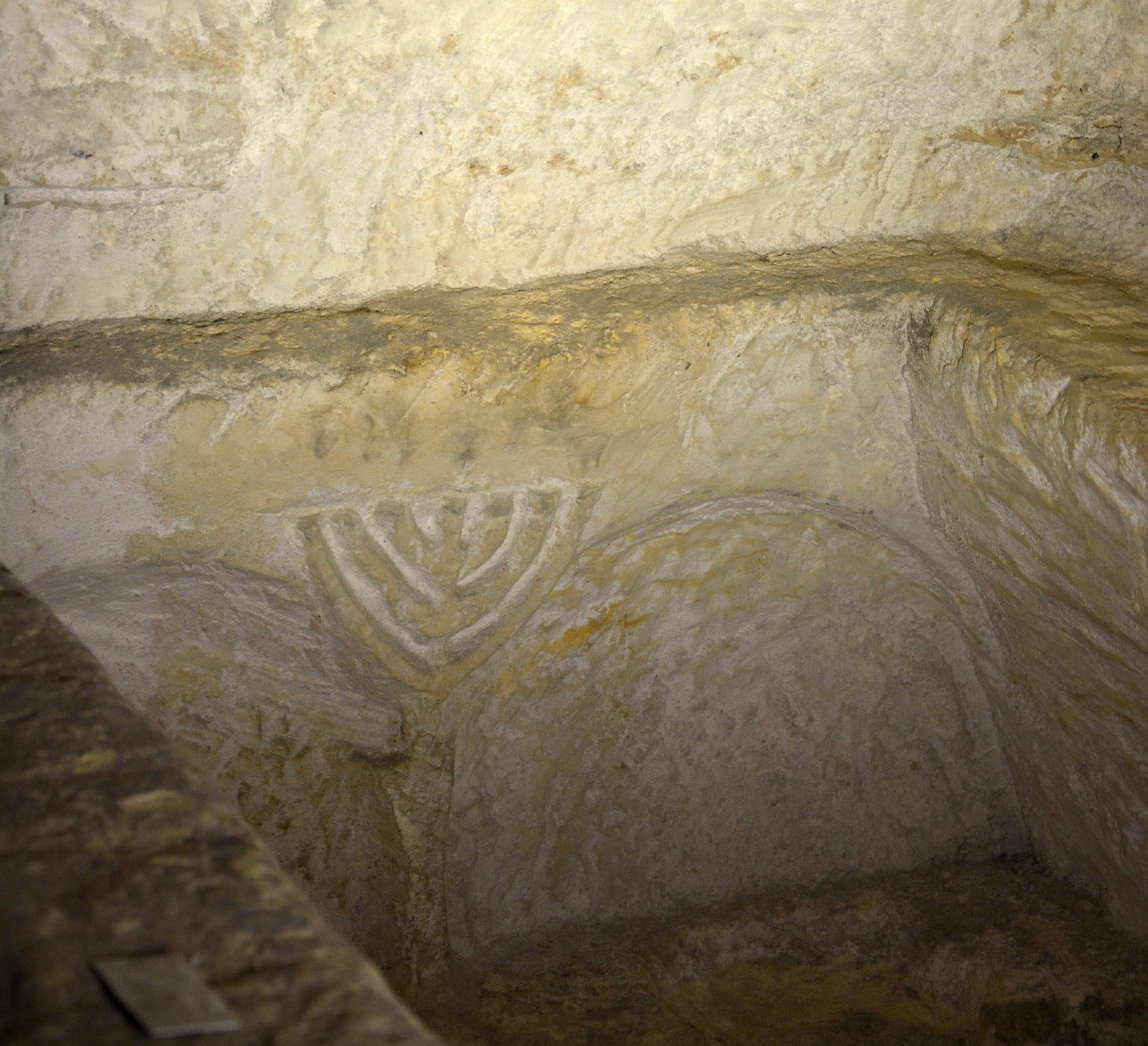
Menorah indicating the presence of Jewish burials in St. Paul's Catacombs in Rabat, Malta

Traditionally, the first Jew to have set foot on Malta was Paul of Tarsus, whose ship according to the legend foundered there in 62 CE. Paul went on to introduce Christianity to the island population.

Six burial sites with carved menorahs in the Rabat catacombs (each with a dozen tombs) indicate that Jews lived side by side with Christians and pagans in Malta during the 4th and 5th centuries, during late Roman and then Byzantine times. The community, led by a council of elders (gerousia), could have gathered up to 300 persons.

== Fatimids, Normans and Aragonese ==
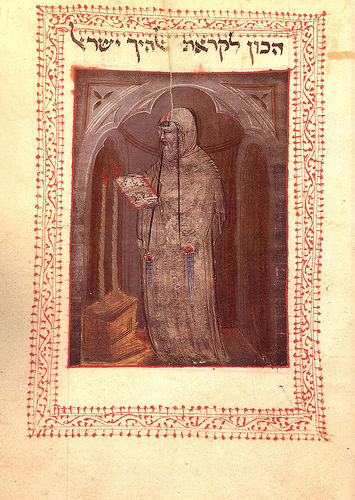
Abraham Abulafia lived on Comino from 1285 to his death in the 1291

There are no archeological or documentary findings of Jewish presence in Malta during the Fatimid Caliphate (870-1090 CE). In nearby Sicily, under the same Arab rule, Jews and Christians lived peacefully. There is no trace of Jewish presence during Norman rule starting in 1091. Only in 1241 do the chronicles of Gilibertus Abbate report as few as 25 Jewish families in Malta and 8 in Gozo compared to 681 Muslim and 1047 Christian families in Malta, and 155 and 203 respectively in Gozo, although the interpretation of these numbers is contested.

In 1285, the Jewish mystic Abraham Abulafia from Zaragoza, after being expelled from the Jewish community of Palermo, retired to live his last years in solitude on Comino, where he taught and perhaps wrote Imrei Shefer, "Words of Beauty", or Sefer haOt, Book of the Sign. In 2003, the presumed remains of Abulafia and of other Jewish Maltese of the 1st century were symbolically reburied in the Jewish Cemetery, Marsa.

In medieval Mdina, the Jewish quarter, il-Giudecco, was the street along the north side of the Cathedral of the Assumption, Victoria (today's Triq il-Fosos); Jews paid a special tax to the town's Universita, being granted in exchange a monopoly on apothecaries and dyers. In the Militia List of 1419-1420 (a register of male adults in Malta, excluding Birgu and Gozo), the column for "la Giudecca" (the Jewish quarter of Mdina) lists 57 conscripted Jewish men. This leads to an estimate of up to 350 Jews in Malta at the time. Families had typical Jewish surnames such as Meyr/Mejr, Melj, Nefus, Levi, Catalanu, de Marsala.

In 1479 Malta and Sicily came under Aragonese rule and the 1492 Alhambra Decree by the Catholic Monarchs forced all Jews to leave Spanish territory. Because they made up such a large portion of the island's population, the Spanish Crown forced them even to pay compensation for the tax losses caused by their own expulsion. It is not clear where the Jews of Malta went, but they may have joined the Sicilian community in the Levant. It is also likely that several dozen Maltese Jews converted to Christianity to remain in the country, as did many Sicilian Jews.

== Knights of Malta ==
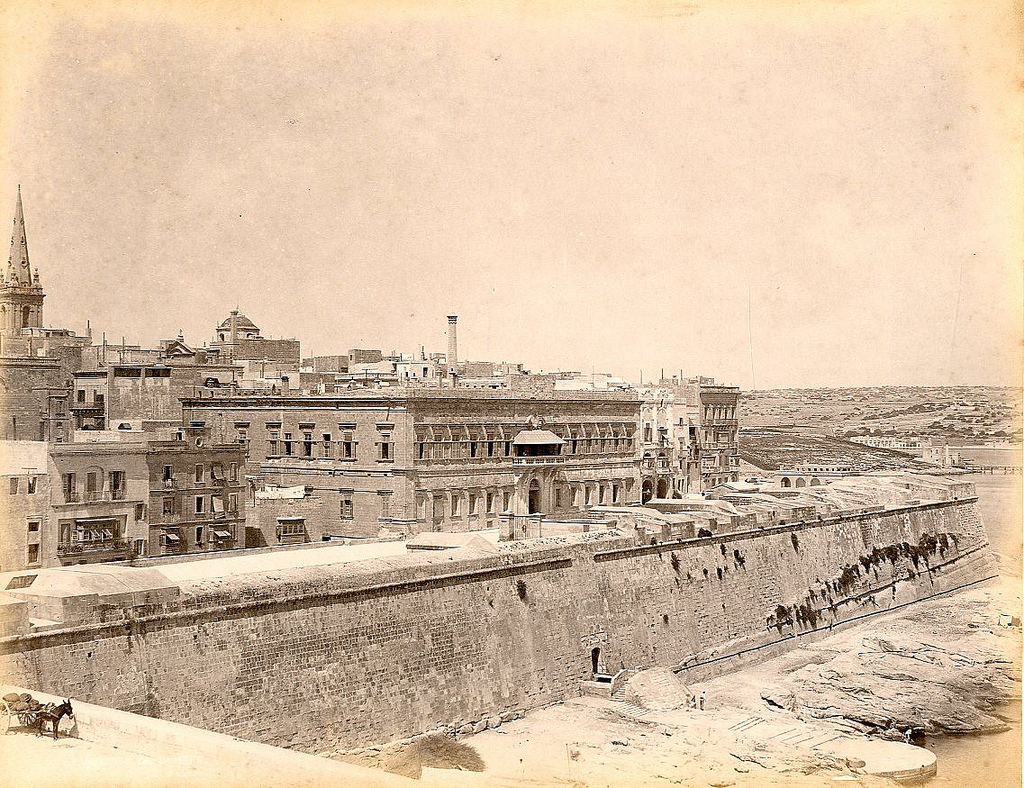
Jews' Sally Port in Valletta

In 1530 Charles V, Holy Roman Emperor, gave Malta to the Knights Hospitaller, who ruled the island until 1798. During these three centuries, the islands had no free Jewish population. Those Sicilian conversos who had moved to Malta, attracted by the Knights' liberal policy towards the Jews of Rhodes, had to continue practicing their religion in secrecy.

Malta was frequently mentioned for its large enslaved Jewish population in Jewish literature of the period. The Knights would capture Jews and Muslims during corsairing raids against Ottoman merchant ships and coastal towns and keep them hostage in the bagnos (prisons) of Birgu, Valletta or Senglea, to extort ransom. It would be up to Jewish Societies for the Redemption of Captives to raise such amounts from Jewish communities across Europe ("pidyon shvuyim"), including Livorno, London and Amsterdam. Failing rescue, Jews would be sold as indentured servants and given a Christian name, to be freed by their master only on deathbed. Those Jews, particularly women, who peddled their services as healers and diviners would often face the Inquisition. Those free Jews who wished to visit the islands had to receive special permission from the Grand Master of the Order and had to enter Valletta's walls through one small port near the Auberge de Bavière, still known as the Jews' Sallyport.

In 1749 a converso, Giuseppe Antonio Cohen, revealed to the authorities the 1749 Muslim slave revolt plot in Malta. For his deed, he was granted a pension of 500 scudi and the ownership of a building in Strada Mercanti, Valletta, which from 1773 owned the Monte di Pietà.

== British colonial period ==
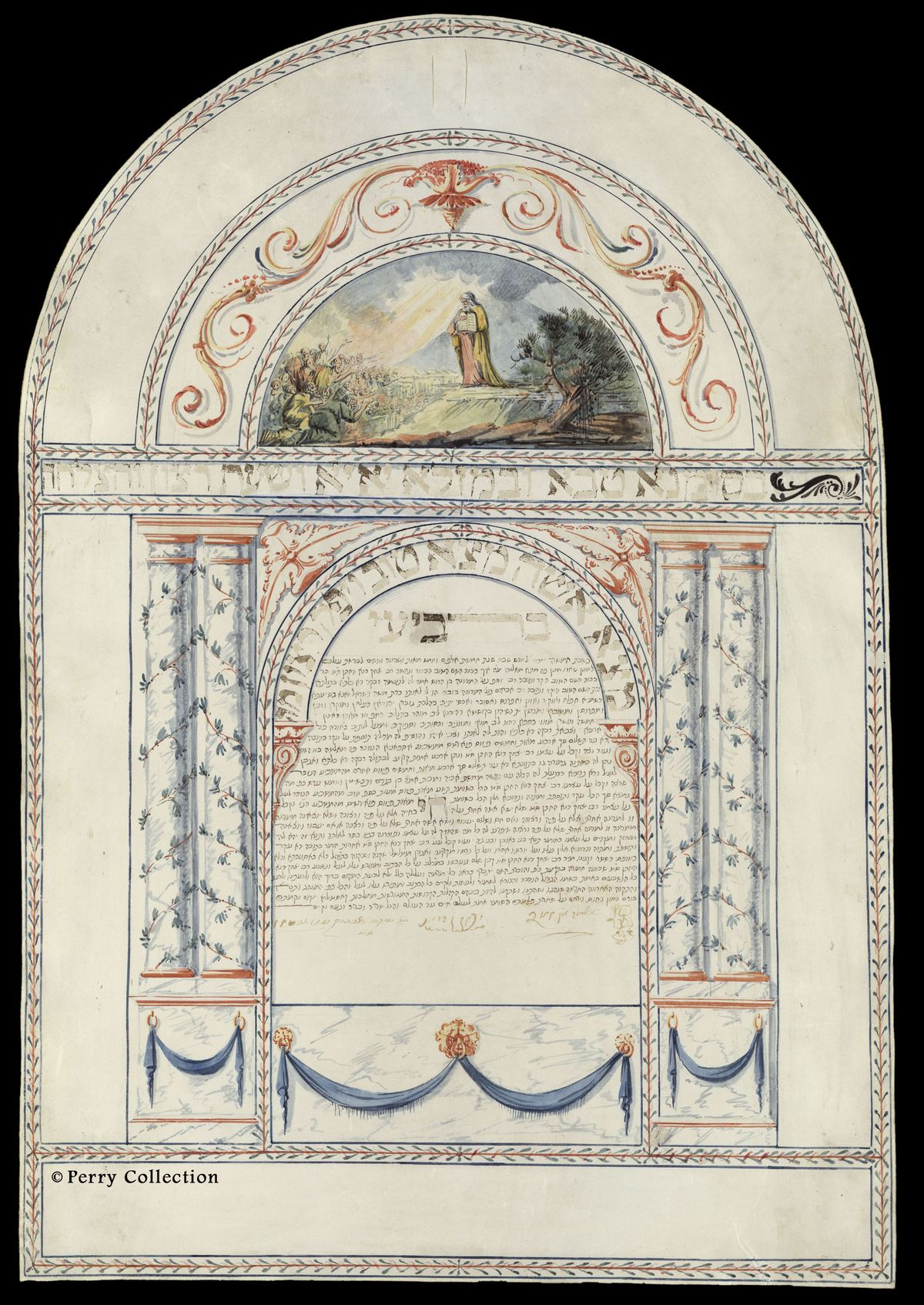
Ketubah from Malta, 1807

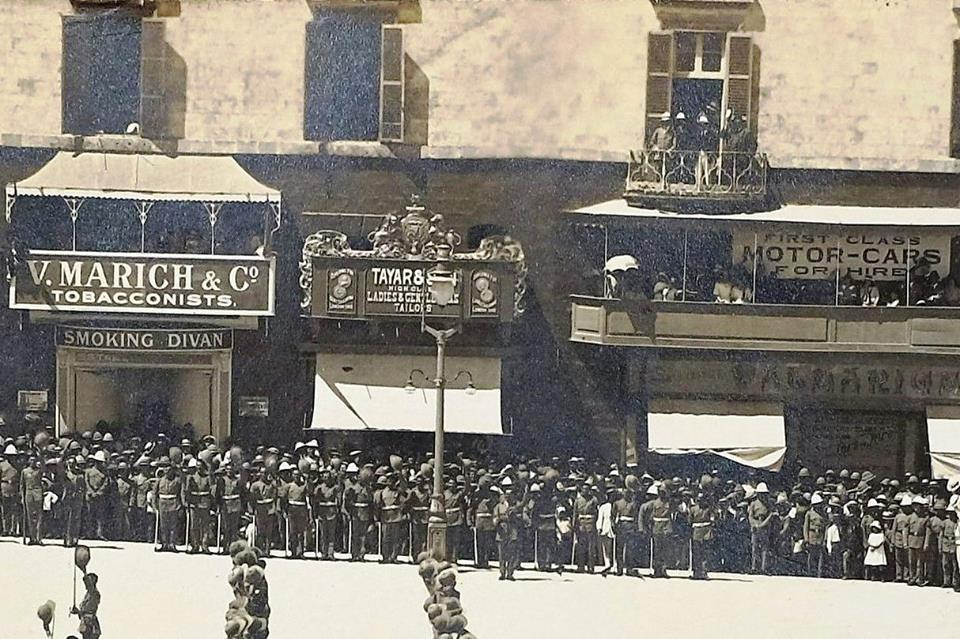
Tayar's textile shop in St George Square, Valletta, 1917

The majority of the contemporary Maltese Jewish community originates in Jewish immigration from England, Gibraltar, North Africa, Portugal and Turkey during the short period of French rule from 1798 to 1800 and British rule after that. From 1805 Jews were the targets of campaigns by the Maltese directed against all foreigners.

The first Jewish families to move to Malta were the Abeasis (Abiaziz) from Gibraltar and the Borges da Silva from Portugal. The teacher Abraham A. Correa arrived in Malta from England in 1809, becoming in 1832 the Hon. Secretary of the British Jews Committee, with Jacob Borges da Silva as president. In 1835, Judith and Moses Montefiore visited Malta, finding only five Jewish families.

By 1846, the community was large enough to invite Josef Tajar from Tripoli to become the first rabbi since 1492. The synagogue, initially in the Tajar residence at 155 Strada Reale, Valletta, later moved to Spur St (9, Strada Sperone). Following the revolutions of 1848, several impoverished Jewish families from Hungary, France and Germany found refuge in Malta; to cater for their needs, the community appealed to the Pidion and to the Rabbinate of London. A report from 1851 notes that the community was led by Jacob Abeasis, Raffaele Bismot and Riccardo Pariente. The wealthiest families were the Borges da Silva and Sonnino. Many Jews were occupied in commerce or finance, as agents and brokers, while others were shopkeepers and traders.

In 1863 Sion Attias became the new rabbi after the death of Josef Tajar. Rabbi Fragi Nimni followed in 1878. An 1881 report noted 79 British Jewish residents, 48 Ottomans, 9 Italians, 4 Portuguese, 3 Tunisians and 2 Germans. In the 1890s, with the backing of the achibishopry, a pamphlet was published which recast the Blood Libel against the Jews. The police quickly intervened to ban it. The Jewish community remained very small and in some periods did not have a rabbi. Morocco-born, Portugal-raised Nissim Ohayon was appointed as the last rabbi in 1934, serving until 1956.

== Contemporary period ==
In the years before World War II, several Jews fleeing Nazism came to Malta, in particular from Austria (Eder family), Italy and Libya (Reginiano family). Numerous Maltese Jews fought in the British Army during the war.

From 1915 till 1944, the Jewish Community was led by Achille Tayar. He was succeeded by Fortunato Habib in 1944–1963, George Tayar in 1963–1994, and then by Abraham Hayim Ohayon, the son of rabbi Nissim Ohayon.

In 1953, the World Jewish Congress counted 56 Jews in Malta, represented in the Jewish Community of Malta, headed by Fortunato Habib with George D. Tayar as secretary. The guide states that "The representation of the community is recognized by the Government. Its five-men Working Committee is elected by the membership. Efforts are being made to arrange for regular Jewish and religious instruction."

In 2019 the Jewish community in Malta gathered around 150 persons, slightly more than the 120 (of which 80 were active) estimated in 2003, and mostly elderly. Many among the newer generations decided to settle abroad, including England and Israel. Most contemporary Maltese Jews are Sephardi, however an Ashkenazi prayer book is used.

The Maltese Jews found themselves without a synagogue when the building in Spur St. was demolished in 1979. In 1984 a new synagogue was opened at 182 Strada San Orsola, but it had to close down in 1995 as the building was collapsing. In 2000, a new synagogue was built in Ta' Xbiex with donations from the United States and the UK. The Jewish Foundation of Malta now manages it along with a Jewish Center.

Malta's relations with Israel have been friendly since the former's independence. A direct flight from Tel Aviv brings up to 300 Israeli tourists to Malta each time.

The local flat bread (ftira) and the traditional Maltese loaf (Ħobż tal-Malt) are both kosher.

Judaism, along with Hinduism, is recognized as a cult but not as a religion in Malta. In 2010, Jewish and Hindu groups in Malta urged Pope Benedict XVI to intervene to ensure that Malta treats all religions equally before the law.

In 2013 the Chabad Jewish Center in Malta was founded by Rabbi Haim Shalom Segal and his wife, Haya Moshka Segal.

In 2023, author Ronald Bugeja appeared on national broadcaster Television Malta and glorified a biography of Hitler that he had written, claiming that Hitler was unaware of that atrocities that had been committed during World War II. In response, an anonymous member of the local Jewish community filed a police report against Bugeja.

== Jewish families in Malta in the 20th century ==
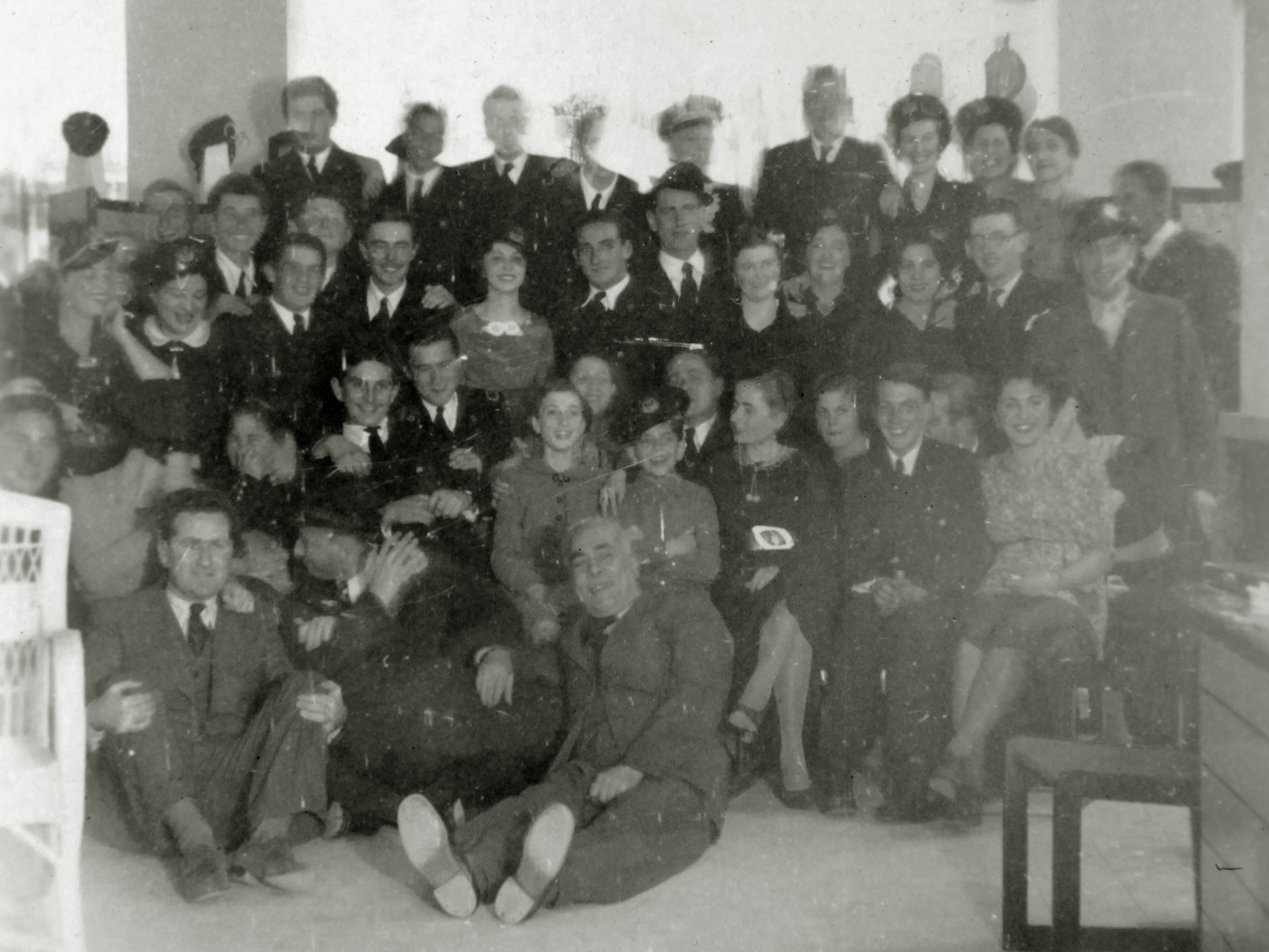
British servicemen and women hosted by Maltese Jewish families, 1940–41. Sitting on the floor: Fortunato Habib, George Tayar (talking), Marco Aroyo.

- Fortunato Habib (1885-1963) was born in Tripoli, the son of Abraham Habib, the chief Rabbi of Benghazi and Tripoli. He moved to Malta in his 20s, soon to start a successful trade in sugar, coffee, and olive oil. Habib established the Lafayette House in Zachary Street, Valletta, upon the franchise of Paris' Galeries Lafayette, dealing in ready-made ladies' fashion, the first such shop in Malta, later expanding in Britannia Street and in Tower Road, Sliema. He is credited (together with the Pace brothers) to have introduced cinema in Malta and to have created the first recordings of Maltese folklore music in 1931, when he accompanied local folk singers, including Is-Semenza and Ix-xudi, to Tunis; 15 titles were recorded there for the German Polyphon label and sold in Malta and to the Maltese communities in Tunis, Alexandria and beyond, via the "Bembaron and Cie" shop. His daughter, Daphne Habib, became a leading concert pianist. Fortunato Habib took over from Achille Tayar as head of the Jewish community during World War II in 1944, leading it till his death in 1963. He is remembered for having helped several other Jewish refugee families, including the Eder, settle in Malta during and after the war; he rests at the Jewish cemetery in Kalkara.
- Hammus and Hannah Reginiano moved to Malta, where he worked as a tailor, from Italian Libya following the 1938 Race Laws. Hammus died in 1941, and his son Menasse was killed in 1942 during the bombing of the Regent Cinema in Valletta. Their other sons and grandchildren remained in Malta.
- Hirsch Herman and Helene Eder moved from Vienna with their children to Malta in 1938. With the start of the war, they were interned with other German, Austrian and Italian citizens; they were released after three months. The following year they were interned again in the old convent of Rabat. Once released a year later, they found their hat factory in Msida had been destroyed by Nazi bombing. After the war, they slowly built a chain of five clothing outlets, Haro, which were quite popular among the first ones to sell ready-made women's clothes. The first was in Britannia St in Valletta, later managed by their daughter Lisl Berger. They also owned the Le Roy Hotel in Qui-Si-Sana, Sliema.
- A Budapest trade unionist, Bela Lowinger (1906-1994), traveled via Trieste and Naples to find refuge in Malta in 1939. His family ran a small shop in Main Street, Rabat, where they were known as the ungerizi. In 1948 he served as an interpreter during the trip to Malta of the Vasas SC football club. He later opened a carpet shop in Tower Rd, Sliema
- Another prominent Maltese Jewish family, Marco and Clare Aroyo, arrived in Malta in the 1930s from Bulgaria. They ran the Swiss House textile shop in Britannia St c/w Zachary St., Valletta in the 1960s-1970s, before moving to the United Kingdom in 1988. Their son Dorian was an accomplished pianist. Another son, Robert, moved to the United Kingdom and later to Israel with his wife Preeti; their two sons were killed in a bomb attack in Gaza in 1971.
- Among the descendants of the first rabbi Jacob Tajar, Ondina, who worked at the Kingsway Pharmacy, and Margot Tayar in the 1960s and 1970s run the "Tayar's Sportex and Tweed " textile shop in Palace Square, Valletta.
- George and Gita Tayar were another prominent family; George Tayar was a big shareholder of Marks and Spencer and introduced it in Malta with Berti Mizzi. Gita Tayar pioneered knitting-at-home in the late 1960s, introducing the textile industry to Gozo with the Levison-Tayar firm. The street in San Ġwann where they used to live is now called Triq George Tayar.

== Jewish cemeteries in Malta ==
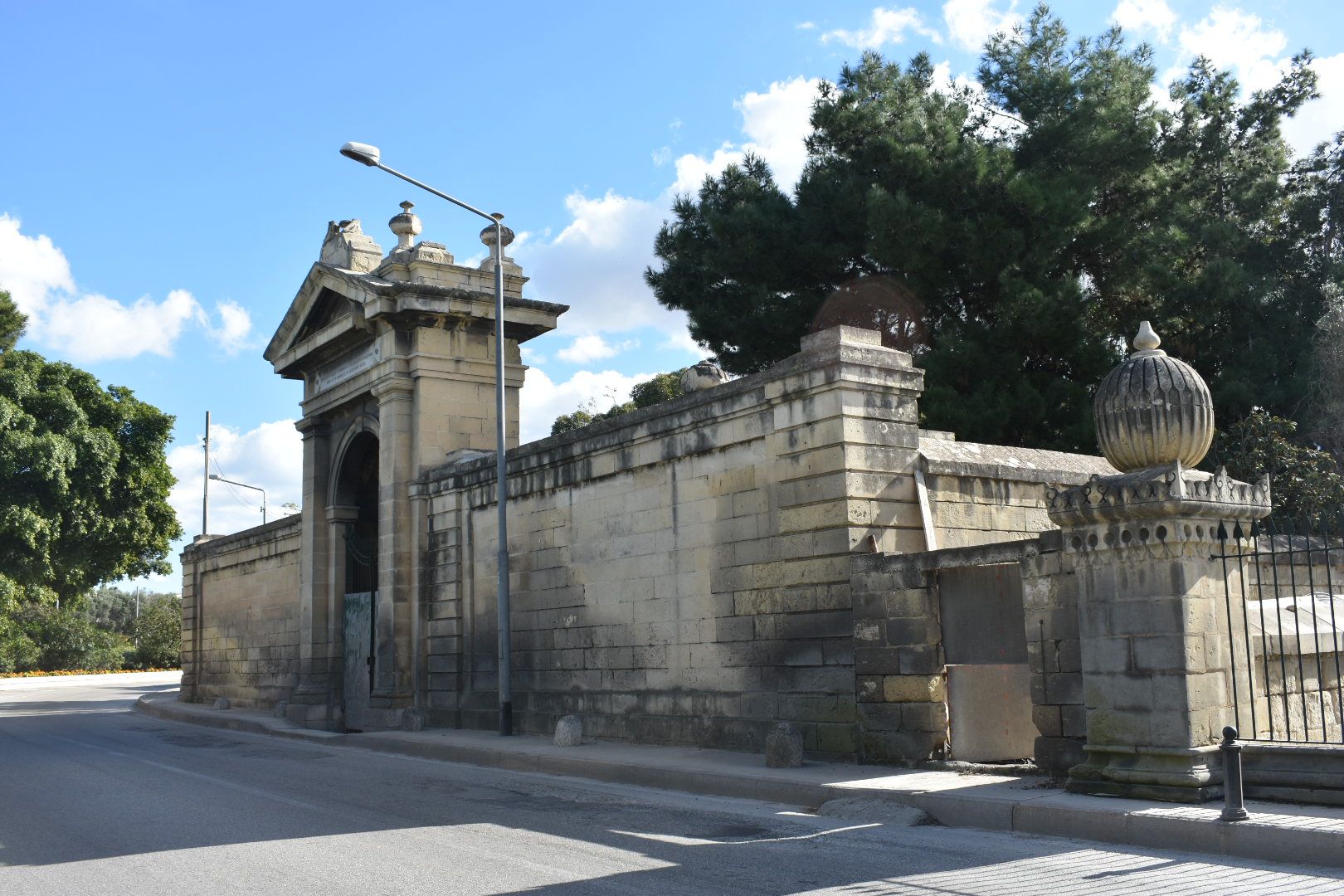
The Jewish Cemetery in Marsa, built in 1879 to designs of Webster Paulson

Jewish cemeteries in Malta include the Kalkara cemetery (1784-1833), the Ta' Braxia Cemetery (1836-1891), and the Marsa Jewish Cemetery (opened 1887).

In 1372 King Fredrick III granted a piece of land at Tabia (today's Qbur il-Lhud at Ghariexem, Mtarfa) to the Universitate Judeorum, the Jewish community, for use as a cemetery. A Hebrew-language tombstone, found on site, was dedicated to Rach[el], spouse of Yeshu’a; it is now preserved at Rabat's Domvs Romana.

A Jewish cemetery was established in Kalkara (Strada Rinella) in 1784 "by the Leghorn fund for ransoming Hebrew slaves, at its own expense, for the burial of the dead of its race". The site was likely an earlier burial place for non-Christians on the island. It contains today twelve identifiable graves from burials in 1820–1834, and other gravestones and fragments. It was refurbished by the Local Council in 2003.

A second burial place for the Maltese Jews was established circa 1836 in a section of the Ta' Braxia Cemetery; it was used until 1891. The Jewish cemetery includes around 120 tombs, mostly in Sefardi-style horizontal slabs.

Finally, a Jewish Cemetery in Marsa was built in 1879 to designs of Webster Paulson, and opened in 1887 adjacent to the Turkish Military Cemetery, thanks to donations from Jewish English Sir Moses Montefiore. The cemetery is still in use by the Jewish community of Malta, and hosts tombs of Jews from Spain, Central Europe and Russia, as well as from places as far away as Australia and Shangai.

== See also ==
- Murder of the Aroyo children
- History of the Jews in Europe

== Bibliography ==
- ROTH, Cecil, The Jews of Malta. Paper read to the Jewish Historical Society of England, 28 March 1928
- TAYAR, Aline P’nina Tayar, How Shall We Sing?: A Mediterranean Journey Through a Jewish Family, Pan Macmillan/Picador Australia, 2000
- WETTINGER, Godfrey, The Jews of Malta in the Late Middle Ages, Midsea Books Limited, Malta, 1985
- DAVIS, Derek, "The Jewish cemetery at Kalkara, Malta", Transactions & Miscellanies (Jewish Historical Society of England), Vol. 28 (1981-1982), pp. 145–170 (26 pages),
- Cassar Carmel, The Jewesses of Malta: Slaves, Peddlers, Healers, Diviners, Studi sull’ Oriente Cristiano. 2013.
- Shelley Tayar, “Shalom: An Account of Malta's Jewish Community Since 1800.” 2009
