= Israel–Malta relations =

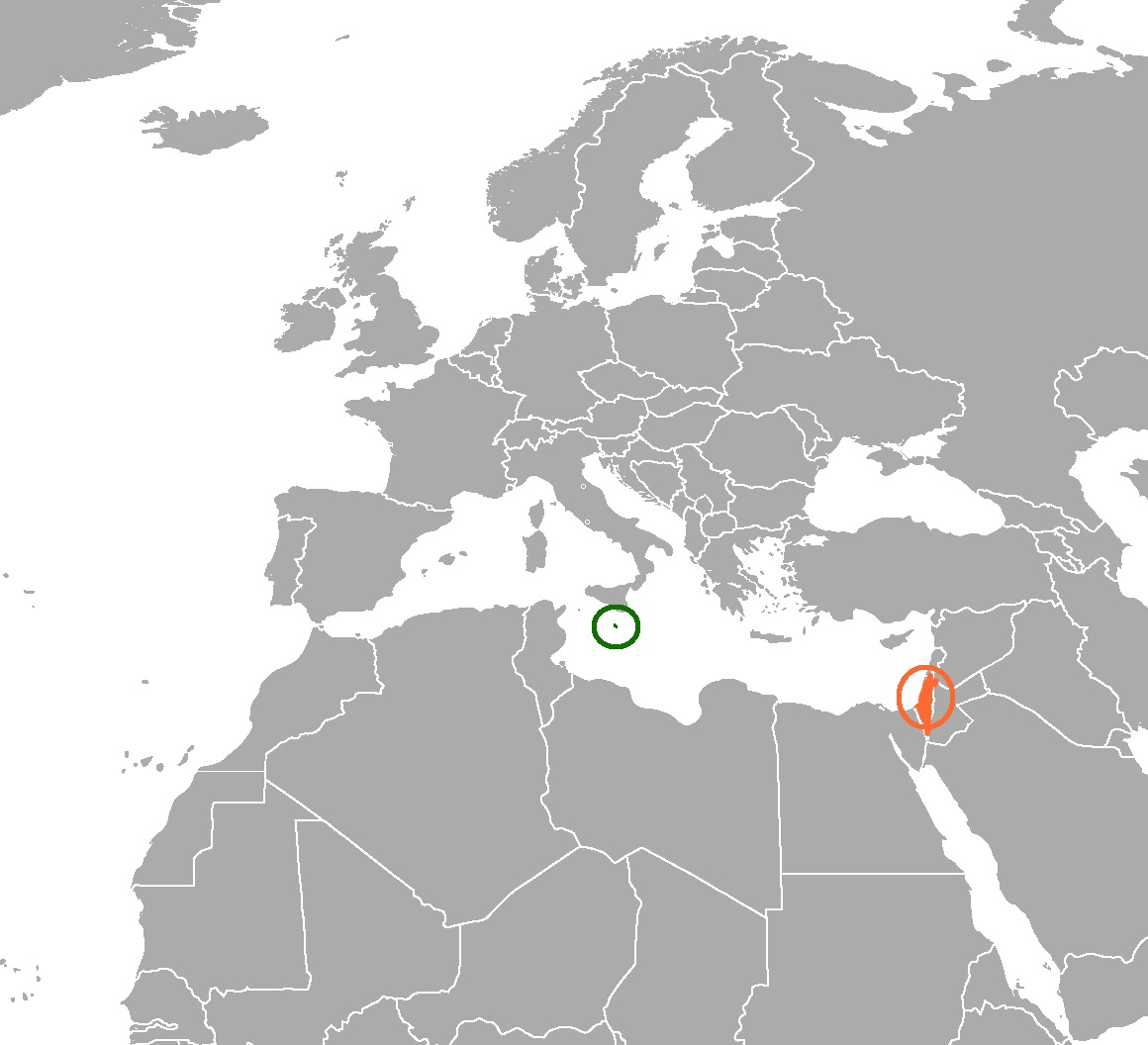
- Malta: Israel

Israel–Malta relations are the bilateral relations between the State of Israel and the Republic of Malta which encompasses the diplomatic, economic, and cultural interactions. Israel and Malta have maintained mixed relations since ties were established in 1965, with some periods of tension.

== Background ==
Prior to the establishment of the State of Israel and the independence of Malta, both territories were part of the British Empire as Mandatory Palestine and the Crown Colony of Malta. From 1919 to the 1920s, British colonial authorities in Malta attempted to encourage Maltese people to emigrate to Palestine, but these efforts were largely unsuccessful. The 1922 census of Palestine lists 38 Maltese speakers in Mandatory Palestine (12 in Jerusalem-Jaffa and 26 in the Northern District), including 33 in municipal areas (4 in Jerusalem, 2 in Jaffa, 21 in Haifa, 5 in Nazareth, and 1 in Beit Jala).

Jewish communities have existed intermittently in Malta since antiquity. In 2026, the ambassador of Israel to Malta stated that although members of Malta’s Jewish community felt safe, Malta was perceived within Israeli society to be an anti-Israel country.

== Relations ==
Formal diplomatic relations between Israel and Malta were officially established on 1 December 1965, the year after the State of Malta became independent. As of 2025, Malta has an embassy in Tel Aviv, but Israel has no embassy in Malta, its former embassy in Ta' Xbiex now hosting by the embassy of Egypt, with the nearest present Israeli embassy being in Rome.

On paper, Malta maintained a policy of neutrality during the Arab–Israeli conflict, though Dom Mintoff, Prime Minister of Malta during the 1970s and 1980s, was described as "increasingly unbalanced on Arab-Israeli issues" according to American documents leaked in the Kissinger cables.

On 11 July 1973, Mintoff argued in a parliamentary debate that Palestinian terrorism was justified due to the Israeli occupation of Palestinian territories, prompting a formal protest by the Israeli ambassador to Malta Drora Ben Yacov. In December 1973, Mintoff reportedly considered breaking relations with Israel after two Israeli patrol craft had anchored in Maltese territorial waters without communicating with the Maltese government. According to declassified documents from the British government, Mintoff told British Prime Minister Edward Heath that Malta was willing to assist the United Kingdom in mediating the Arab–Israeli conflict, but nothing came of this due to Malta's strained relations with Israel as a result of the islands' relations with Libya. Israeli Prime Minister Golda Meir reportedly had a "strong personal aversion" to Mintoff.

The Maltese government has recognised Palestinian aspirations for statehood since 1988, and has traditionally had close and friendly relations with Palestine. On 26 October 1995, Palestinian resistance leader Fathi Shaqaqi was assassinated in Sliema, Malta by an unidentified gunman and an accomplice who are believed to have been Mossad operatives. Maltese Prime Minister Eddie Fenech Adami and opposition leader Alfred Sant both wore a Palestinian keffiyeh during an anti-Israel demonstration in 2002, infuriating the Israeli ambassador to Malta.

On 24 April 2010, Maltese activist Bianca Zammit was shot in the leg by Israel Defense Forces soldiers during a peaceful pro-Palestinian protest along the Gaza–Israel barrier. In the aftermath of the shooting, Israeli ambassador to Malta Gideon Meir criticized the International Solidarity Movement which Zammit was a member of. Following a diplomatic protest by the Maltese government, Israeli foreign minister Avigdor Lieberman formally apologised for the incident. An investigation was carried out and two IDF soldiers were given suspended sentences after being found guilty of going against their orders. Maltese foreign minister Tonio Borg visited Israel and occupied Palestine and spoke out against Israel's blockade of the Gaza Strip in December 2010.

Maltese Prime Minister Joseph Muscat visited Israel in 2013, his first foreign visit after assuming office. Israel Post and MaltaPost issued a joint postage stamp issue to commemorate the 50th anniversary of diplomatic relations between the two states on 28 January 2014. Direct flights by Air Malta between Malta and Ben Gurion Airport in Tel Aviv commenced in April 2017, and the following year Malta received 22,645 visitors from Israel according to the Malta Tourism Authority. In February 2019, Malta's embassy in Tel Aviv moved to larger premises whilst an April 2019 The Times of Israel article claimed that Israel–Malta relations were "rock-solid", apart from some differences over the status of Jerusalem and the Israeli–Palestinian conflict.

Relations between Israel and Malta once again deteriorated due to the Gaza war. During a November 2023 press conference, Maltese Prime Minister Robert Abela refused to describe Hamas as a terrorist organisation, instead criticising European Parliament President Roberta Metsola for expressing her solidarity with Israel. In April 2024, Malta supported granting full UN membership to the State of Palestine, leading to a formal protest by Israel. A Gaza Freedom Flotilla vessel was attacked by drones in international waters approximately 14–17 nautical miles (26–31 km) off Malta's coast on 2 May 2025, alleged to have been perpetrated by the IDF. Maltese Prime Minister Robert Abela announced that Malta would formally recognize the State of Palestine at the September 2025 meeting of the United Nations General Assembly. All Malta Labour Party MEPs have described to the situation in Gaza as a genocide.

== See also ==
- Foreign relations of Israel
- Foreign relations of Malta
- History of the Jews in Malta
- List of ambassadors of Israel to Malta
