= Ondina Tayar =

Maltese writer and pharmacist

Ondina Tayar (May 9, 1912 – November 19, 2004) was a Maltese writer and pharmacist. As a student at the University of Malta in the early 1930s, she became both one of the first female university graduates in the country and one of the first Maltese women authors. She also worked to develop a written form of the Maltese language during the Language Question controversy.

== Biography ==
Ondina Tayar was born into a Jewish family in Valletta, Malta, in 1912. She was a descendant of Jacob Israel, a rabbi who had come to Malta from Corfu in 1869. Tayar grew up in Valletta and later in St. Julian's.

Her father, Abraham, was supportive of her pursuit of an education, although her mother, Rakel, disapproved. After the University of Malta began allowing women to attend in 1926, Tayar applied to study medicine there. However, she was rejected from the medical program after she expressed approval of Darwin's Theory of Evolution, which was a forbidden topic in the Catholic country at the time. She instead graduated in 1933 with a pharmaceutical chemistry diploma, which allowed her to work as a pharmacist. With this, she became one of the first women in Malta to hold a university degree, and the first to obtain a pharmaceutical degree, alongside her classmate Maria Caruana. She had studied in the pharmacy program alongside Ċensu Tabone, who would go on to become president of Malta.

While at the university, Tayar became one of the first published women writers in Malta. She published several short stories in Leħen il-Malti, the publication of the student organization Għaqda tal-Malti – Università, between 1932 and 1935. Her work also appeared in such publications as La Brigata, a literary journal.

Tayar was interested in the Maltese language, and she joined the Committee for the Standardisation of Maltese Orthography. As part of this group, she helped to develop a written form of the Maltese language. She and her family supported the use of Maltese during the country's Language Question, and she began intentionally writing stories in Maltese in this period, with the family deciding to only speak Maltese at home instead of Italian during the Abyssinia Crisis in 1935.

After college, she worked as a pharmacist, then later kept her father's tailoring business going after his death. She never married, saying that her mother had instilled in her an "apprehension of men," though she had at one point fallen in love with a Catholic but was forbidden from marrying him.

She died in Florence in 2004, at age 92.

== See also ==
- History of the Jews in Malta
