= Church of the Holy Trinity, Sliema =

Holy Trinity Church
- The Parish Church of the Holy Trinity
- Il-knisja tat-Trinita Qaddisa
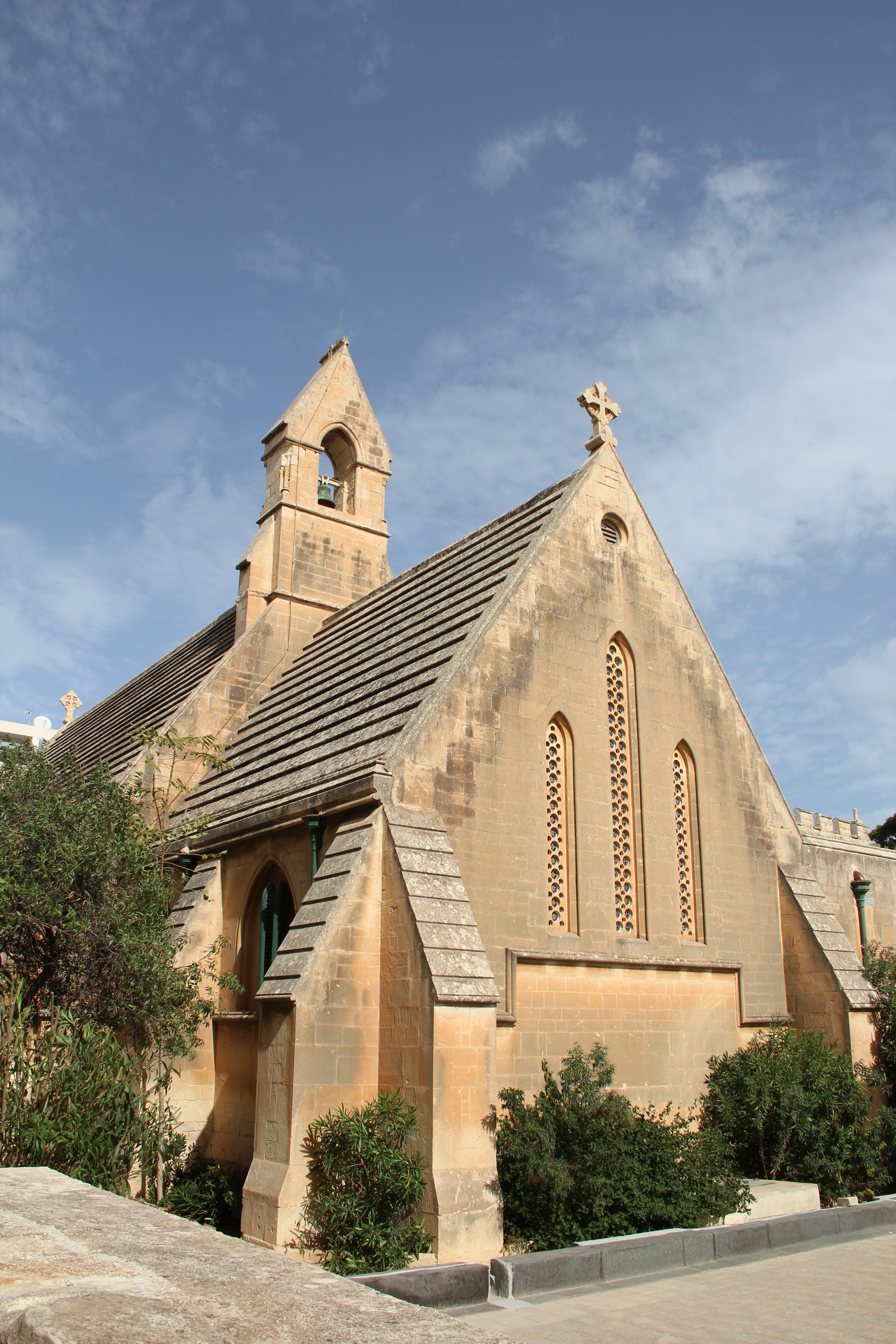

- Location within Malta
- 35°54′35.5″N 14°29′45.6″E
- Location: Sliema
- Country: Malta
- Denomination: Church of England

History
- Status: Active
- Founded: 20 September 1866
- Founder: Walter Trower
- Dedication: Holy Trinity by Acting-Governor, Major-General Ridley,
- Consecrated: 23 April 1867

Architecture
- Functional status: Parish Church
- Architect: Webster Paulson of G.M. Hills of London
- Architectural type: Country English Church
- Style: High Victorian Gothic
- Construction cost: £4000

Specifications
- Materials: Limestone

Administration
- Province: Canterbury
- Diocese: Diocese in Europe
- Archdeaconry: Italy and Malta

Clergy
- Bishop: Robert Innes

The Church of the Holy Trinity is a Church of England church in Sliema, Malta which was built to resemble an English village church and opened in 1866.

== Origins ==
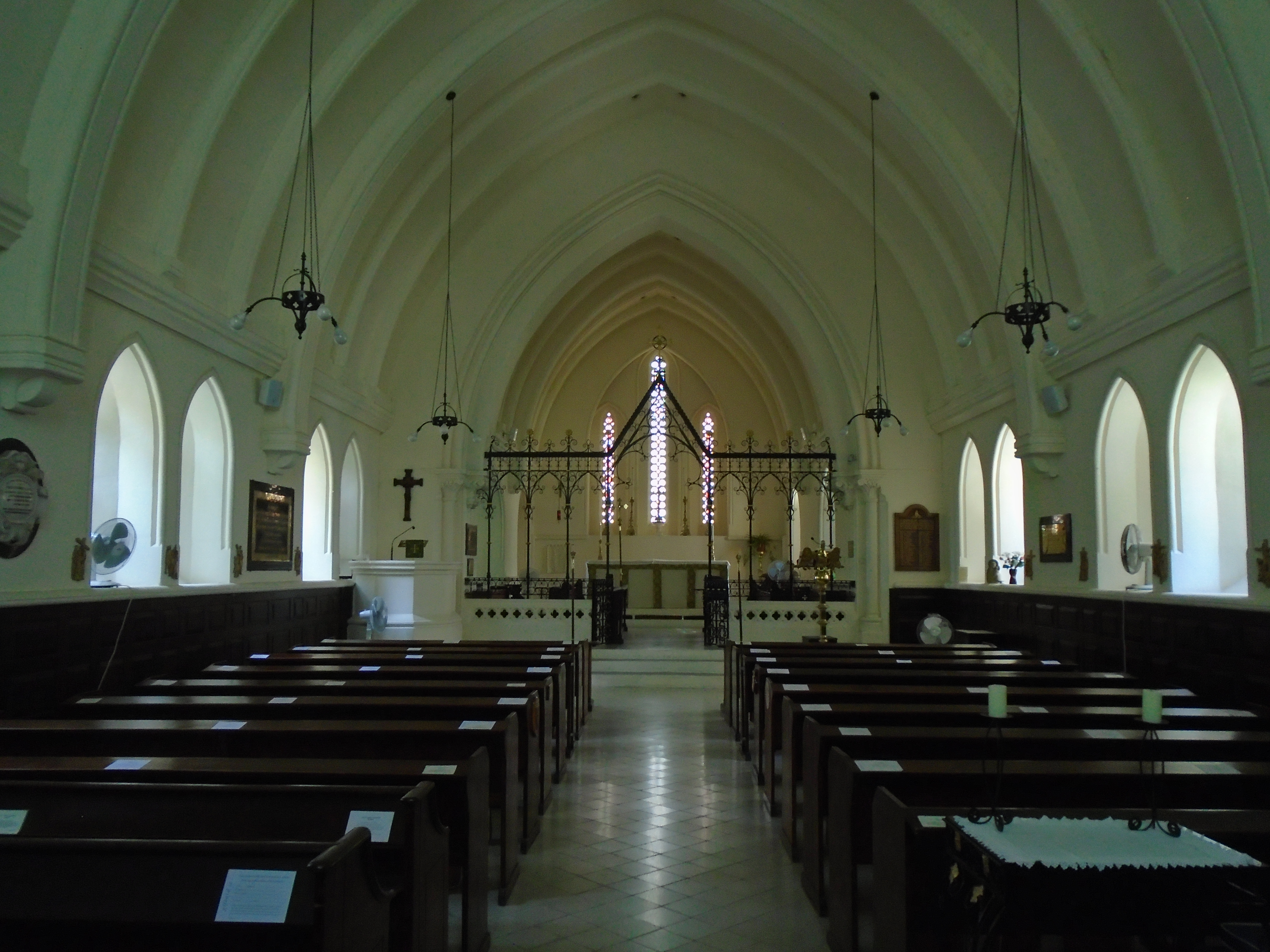
Interior of the church

The land upon which the church and the adjacent Bishop's house are built was acquired by Jane Trower, the daughter of Walter Trower, Bishop of Gibraltar, for £1050. She intended to donate the property to the Diocese of Europe but the law did not permit an unmarried woman to make a donation exceeding £50. So her father became party to the Deed of Gift and refunded the money back to her. The church architecture is not common in Malta. The church was built to resemble an English village church.

In 1865, Webster Paulson was commissioned as a contractor in the construction of the church, which was built to designs of Gordon MacDonald Hills (1826-1895).

The church was completed in 1866 and opened to the public. It was consecrated on April 23, 1867 by Bishop Walter Trower of Gibraltar.

The Reverend Dr Thomas Burbidge was the first vicar of the church.

== Bishop's House ==
The building adjacent to the church is known as the Bishop's House. It was built in 1855 as a residence for the vicar. Today the house still serves the same purpose.

== See also ==
- Culture of Malta
- History of Malta
- List of Churches in Malta
- Religion in Malta

== Website ==
Holy Trinity Sliema
