= Representative office of Malta, Ramallah =

Representative office of Malta to the State of Palestine

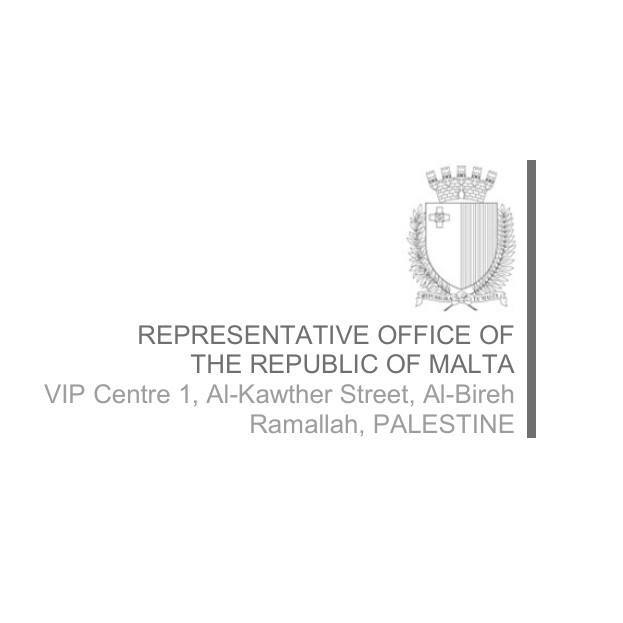

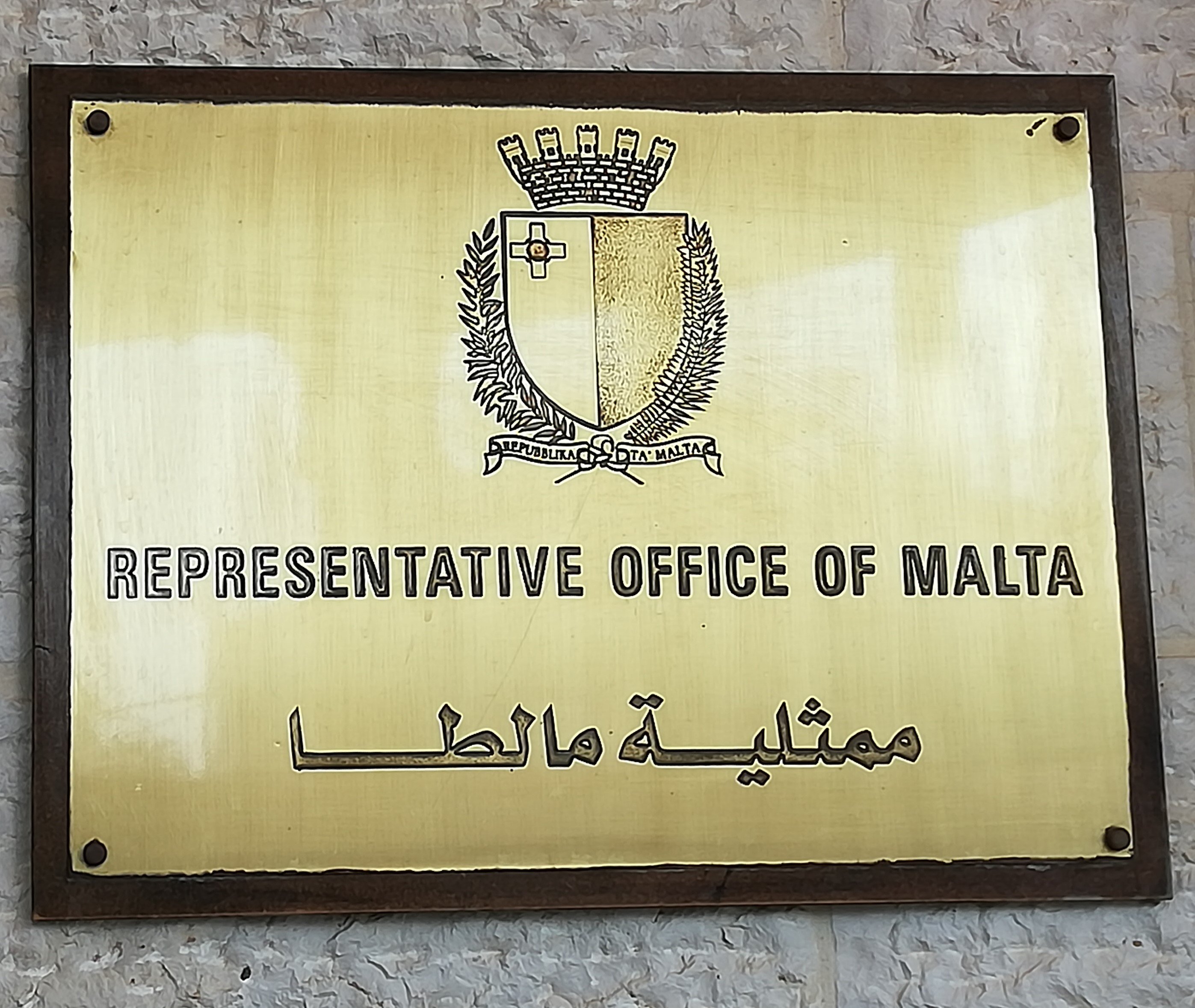

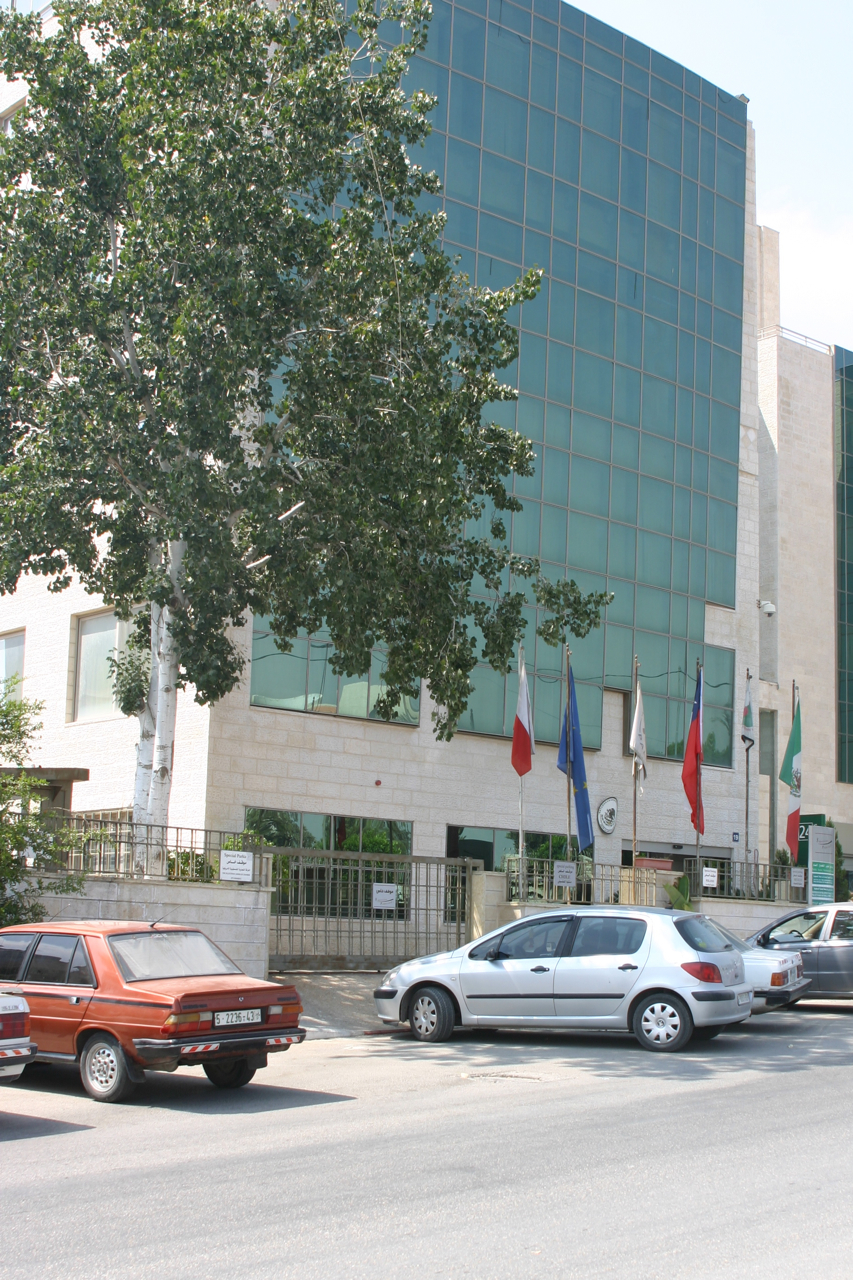
Building hosting the Representative office of Malta in Ramallah

The Representative Office of the Republic of Malta in Ramallah, Palestine (Arabic: ممثلية مالطا في رام الله) opened in June 2009 and is the embodiment of the traditional ties of friendship between Malta and Palestine. Apart from taking care of the enhancement of Malta - Palestine Relations in the political and economic spheres. The Office also encourages support and cooperation between the Maltese and Palestinian people. The aim of the Representative Office of Malta in Palestine is also to monitor the constantly changing political situation and developments regarding the Israeli-Palestinian Peace Process. The Goal of the Peace Process is to achieve an independent, democratic and viable State of Palestine living side by side by the State of Israel.

The Representative Office promotes Malta in Palestine through various events of cultural and economic diplomacy.

== Representatives ==
The Office is headed by the Head of Representative Office ( Representative ), who is a Maltese diplomat. Including:

- Alan Bugeja (June 2009 - April 2012)
- Mark Anthony Pace (July 2012 - September 2015)
- Reuben Gauci (October 2015 - September 2020)
- Franklin Aquilina (September 2020 – September 2025)
- David Muscat (October 2025 - Present)
