= Casino Notabile =

Former Clubhouse in Rabat, Malta

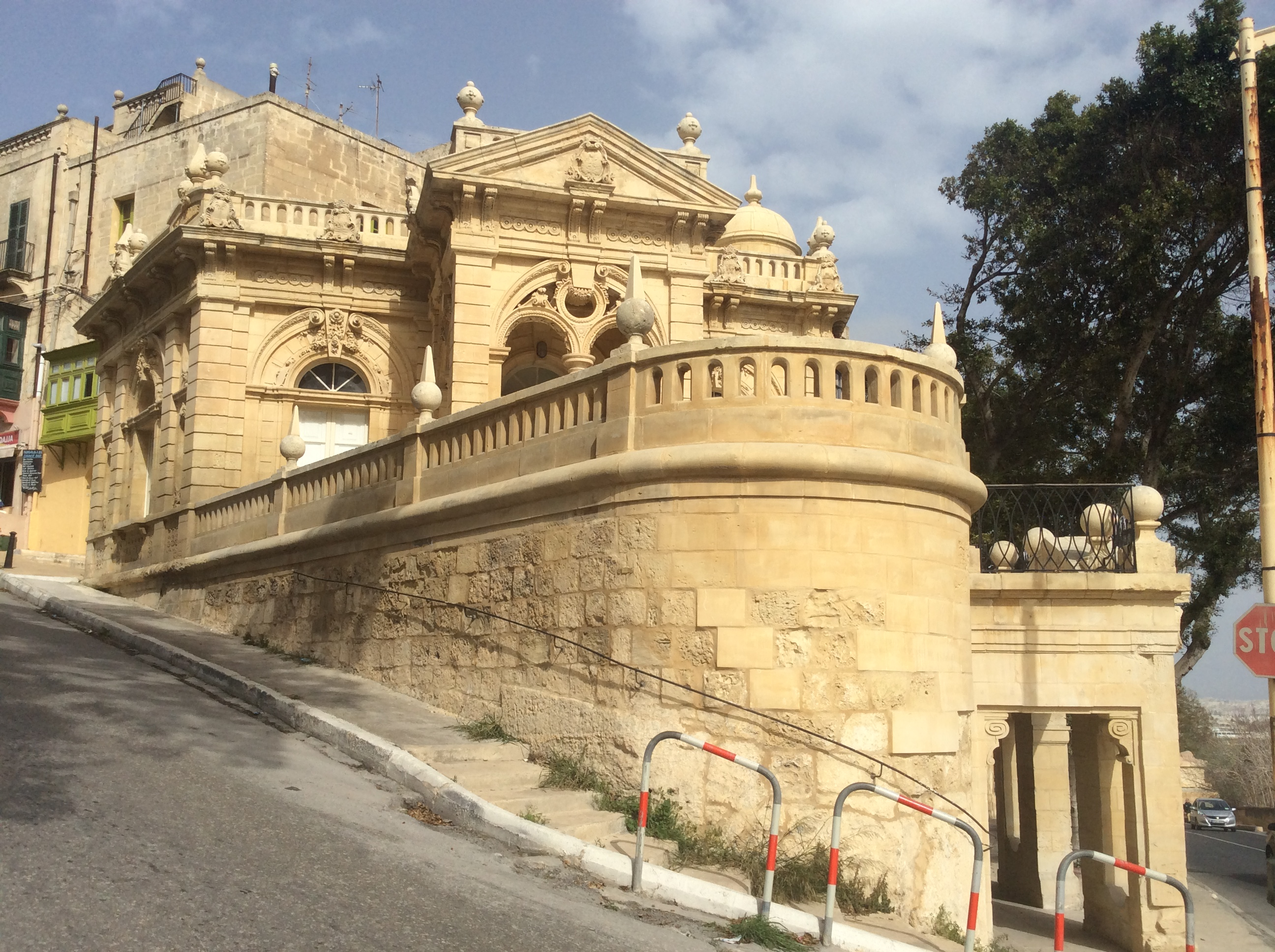
- The Casino Notabile after restoration
- Interactive map of the Casino Notabile area

General information
- Status: Intact
- Type: Clubhouse
- Location: Mdina, Malta
- Coordinates: 35°52′58.9″N 14°24′12.4″E
- Construction started: 1887
- Completed: c. August 1888

Technical details
- Material: Limestone
- Floor count: 1

Design and construction
- Architect: Webster Paulson

Other information
- Number of rooms: 3

The Casino Notabile, formerly also known as Point de Vue, is a former clubhouse located at Saqqajja Hill, outside the walls of Mdina, Malta. It is a small, ornate building, which was built in around 1887–88 to designs of Webster Paulson. It was in a dilapidated state and in danger of collapsing until being restored in 2016.

== History ==
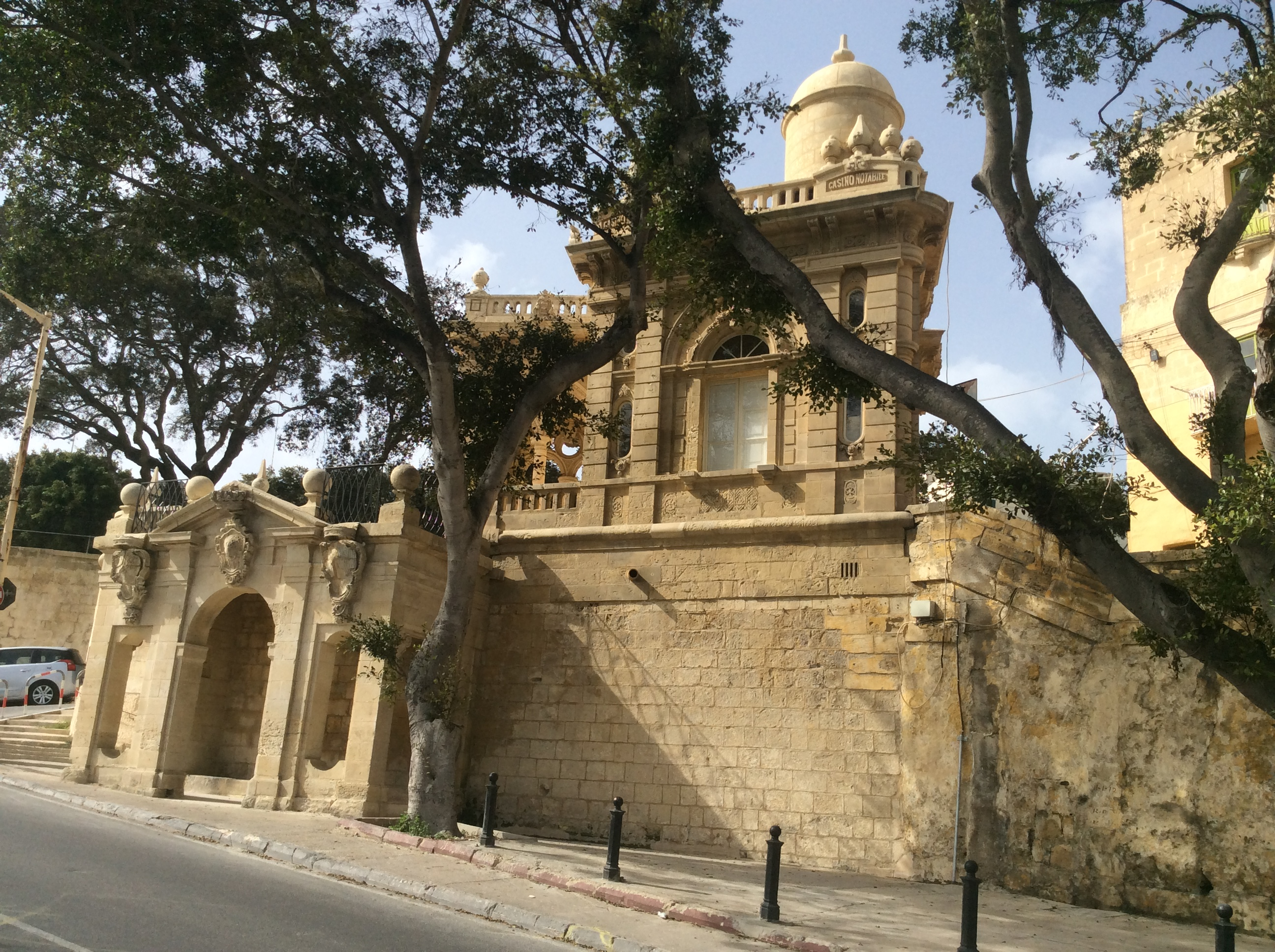
The Casino Notabile (right) and the 18th-century Saqqajja wash house (left)

In 1886, a group of noblemen from Mdina commissioned the British architect Webster Paulson to design a clubhouse which was to be built on Saqqajja Hill. The proposed design was submitted by October 1886, and the building was completed sometime before August 1888. Paulson died on 16 August 1887, while the building was still under construction, making the Casino Notabile his last work. The clubhouse was constructed on the site of a belvedere, and it overlooks a wash house which was built in the late 18th century. Due to its location on the crest of a plateau, overlooking an unobstructed view, it was also known as Point de Vue.

By the beginning of the 21st century, the building was abandoned and in a state of disrepair. In 2008, wooden planks were propped up against its façade in order to prevent it from collapsing. The foundations were also unstable since it was constructed on top of a clay base. The local councils of both Rabat and Mdina lobbied to the government for its restoration.

Works on the building were delayed since the Restoration Directorate was focusing on restoring the fortifications of Mdina, and the site was deemed to be stable after being monitored. By 2012, the wooden beams had been replaced by scaffolding. The restoration work and consolidation of the foundations was approved in 2015, and the work was carried out in 2016. The restoration cost around €200,000.

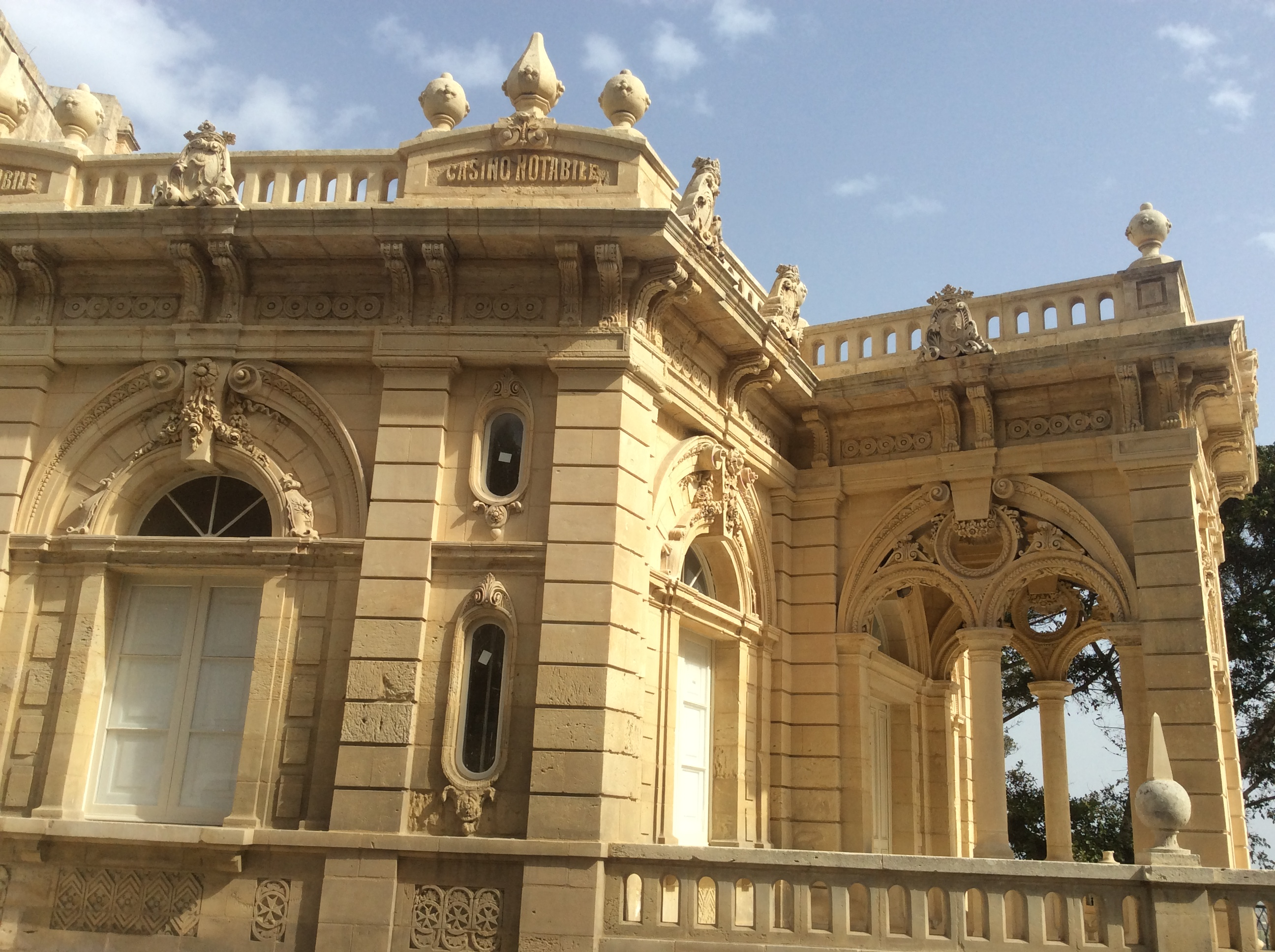
Details of Casino Notabile

The Casino Notabile is scheduled as a Grade 1 national monument.

== Architecture ==
The Casino Notabile is a flamboyant building with an eclectic design. Paulson was probably influenced by the works of French Beaux-Arts architects, and the building's design reflects the architecture of the Belle Époque era found in Paris and Nice. The Casino is a small structure consisting of three rooms, along with an open terrace and a front porch, constructed out of local limestone.

The Casino contains a bust of the Governor, which is the work of the Sicilian sculptor Giuseppe Valenti. The latter might have also sculpted the intricate carvings of the building's exterior.
