= Saqqajja =

Coordinates: 35°52′58″N 14°24′10″E

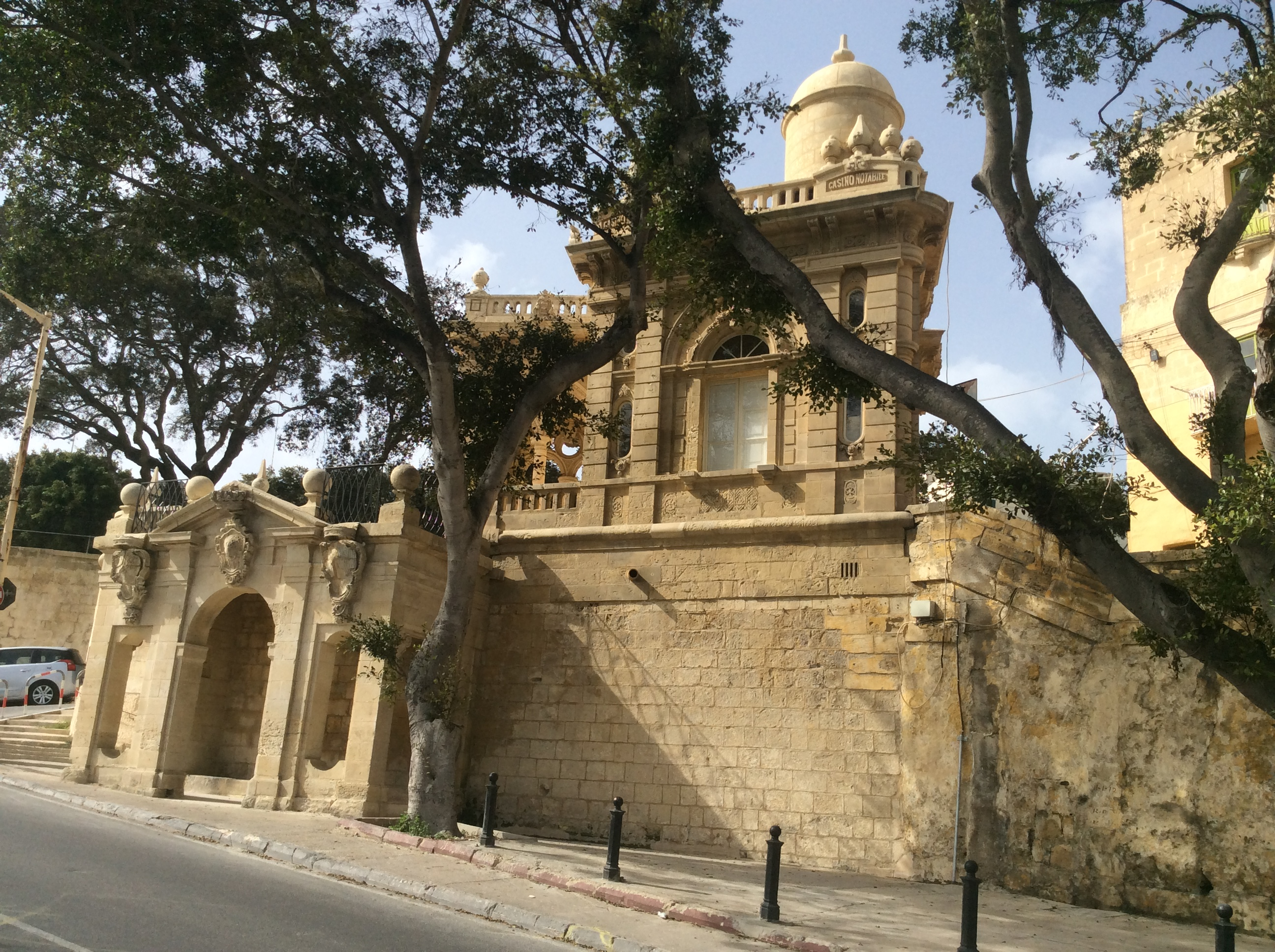
The Casino Notabile (right) and the 18th-century Saqqajja wash house (left)

Saqqajja is an urban area within the administration of Mdina, Malta, outside the walled city.

The name "Saqqajja" originates from the Arab period, from a spring of fresh water in the area. The fountain of the spring that we see today was commissioned by Grandmaster Alof de Wignacourt, when the aqueduct system was being designed between Rabat and Valletta.

== History ==
In 1449, the Augustinian Friars exchanged land in Mellieħa with land outside the capital city of Mdina, including the Saqqajja area. The friars built a convent and a cemetery which were later destroyed and the site was developed again for other purposes.

The niche of Saint Paul, situated in the centre of the square, was built during the magistery of Grandmaster António Manoel de Vilhena in 1727. When the population of Rabat went through a famine, plagues and other hardships, the niche served as a site of religious devotion.

During the time of the Crown Colony of Malta, Saqqajja was developed further with the building of residential Art Nouveau townhouses, Casino Notabile, Point de Vue and Villa Fringila.

== Current usage ==
A bus terminus and a nearby shopping outlets converted the grounds into a social and commercial centre. It is a recreational place all year round, mainly during summer: Muscat considers the square "a lovely evening resort". The place is well known for its feasts, processions and cultural activities. On the 29 June, on the feast of L-Imnarja (Saint Peter; St. Paul) each year L'Isle Adam Band Club A.D. 1860, perform a band concert for the celebration of this feast in front of the niche of Saint Paul.
