= 1967–1971 Gazan insurgency =

Low-level conflict in the Gaza Strip

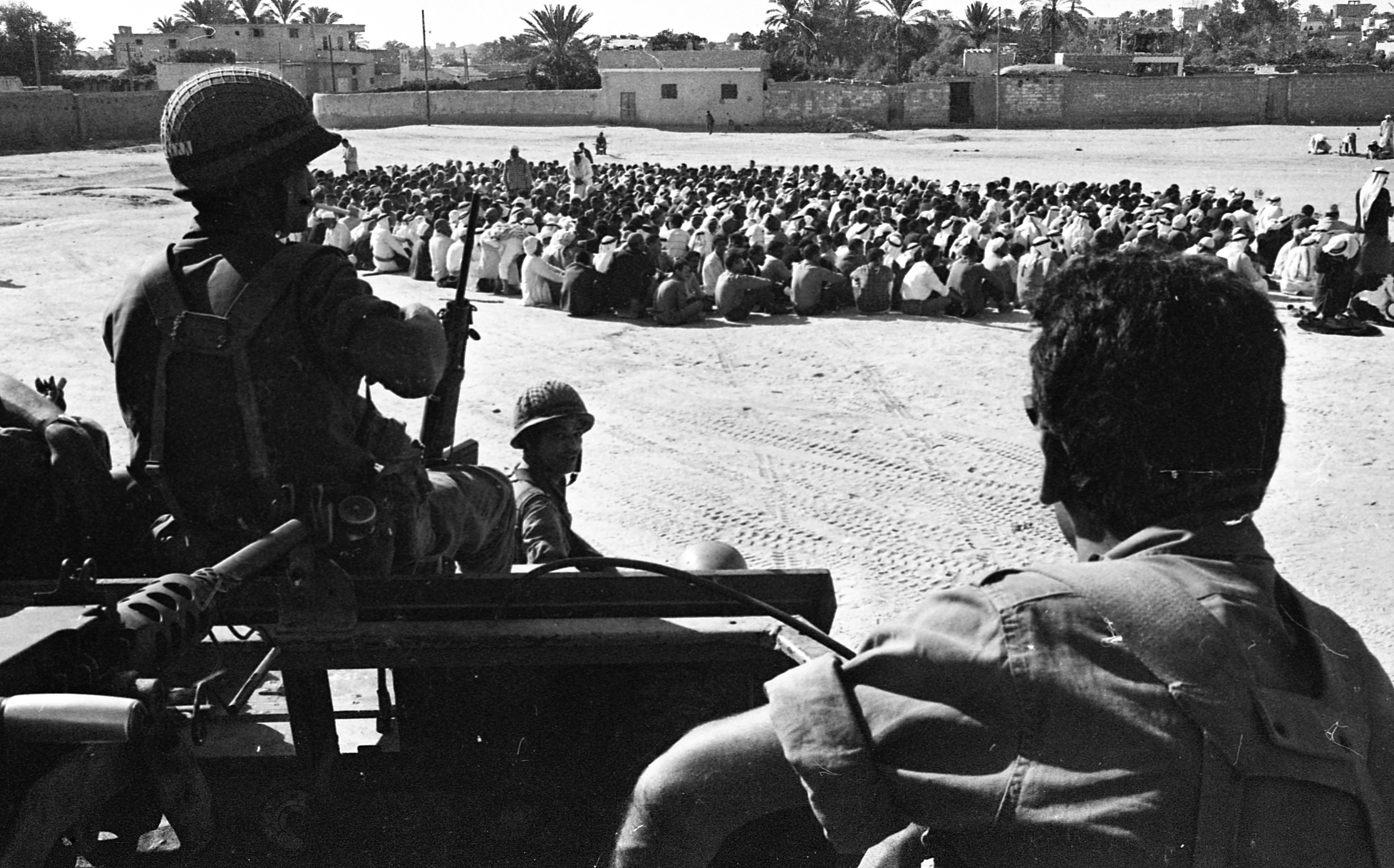
Israeli soldiers organizing a mass arrest of Palestinians, searching for activists, during the insurgency

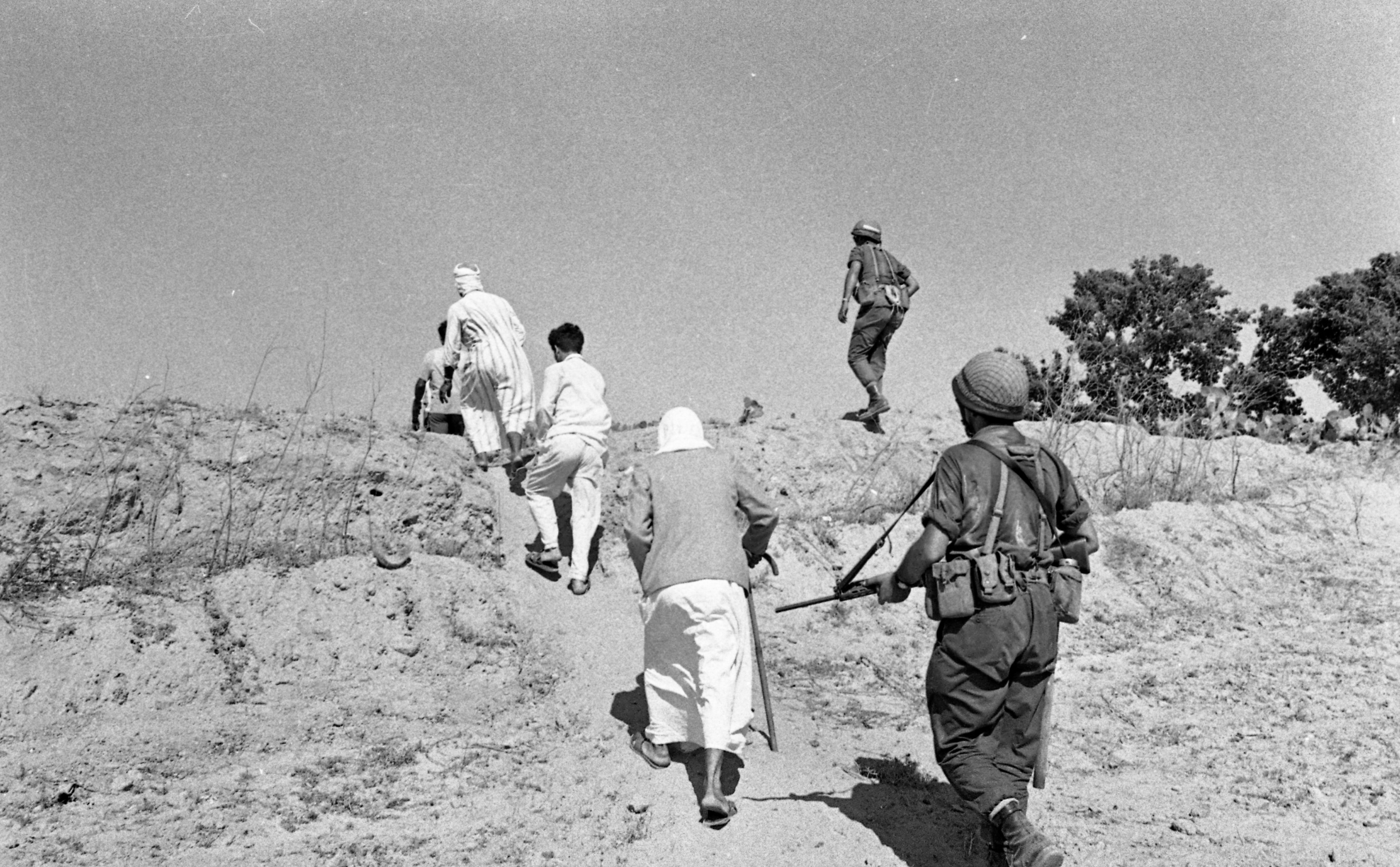
Israeli soldiers checking Palestinian villagers in 1969

Between 1967 and 1971, the Palestinian Gaza Strip was in a state of heightened unrest and violence. Beginning with the Israeli occupation of the Gaza Strip following the Six-Day War, the period would see a combination of an insurgency by fedayeen factions and civil disobedience by the civilian population. The unrest would largely come to an end in 1971 as a result of an extensive pacification campaign led by Israeli general Ariel Sharon. According to Nathan Shachar, during this period, "Affairs in the Strip never came close to the degree of relative calm achieved in the West Bank... There was never one calm week in the Strip, and during 1969 the Israelis seemed to be losing their grip."

== Background ==
Between 1948 and 1967, the Gaza Strip was occupied by Egypt. Beginning in the early 1960s, the Egyptian government began to relax its restrictions on Palestinian political activity in Gaza, leading to the creation of the semi-elected Palestinian Legislative Council, the General Federation of Trade Unions in Gaza, the Palestinian Women's Society and the Palestine Liberation Army. Following the Israeli military's victory in the Six-Day War in 1967, the Israeli government began an occupation of the Palestinian West Bank and Gaza Strip, the Syrian Golan Heights, and the Egyptian Sinai Peninsula.

== Insurgency ==
In an October 1970 article for The New York Times, James Feron noted that "the Gaza Strip re mains the only area occupied by Israel in the Six‐Day War where terrorism continues unabated. Several times a week the military governor issues reports of killings, grenade attacks and sabotage. Most of the victims are Arabs, some of them marked as suspected collaborators with Israel."

The most prominent of the militant groups was the leftist Popular Front for the Liberation of Palestine.

== Civil disobedience and riots ==
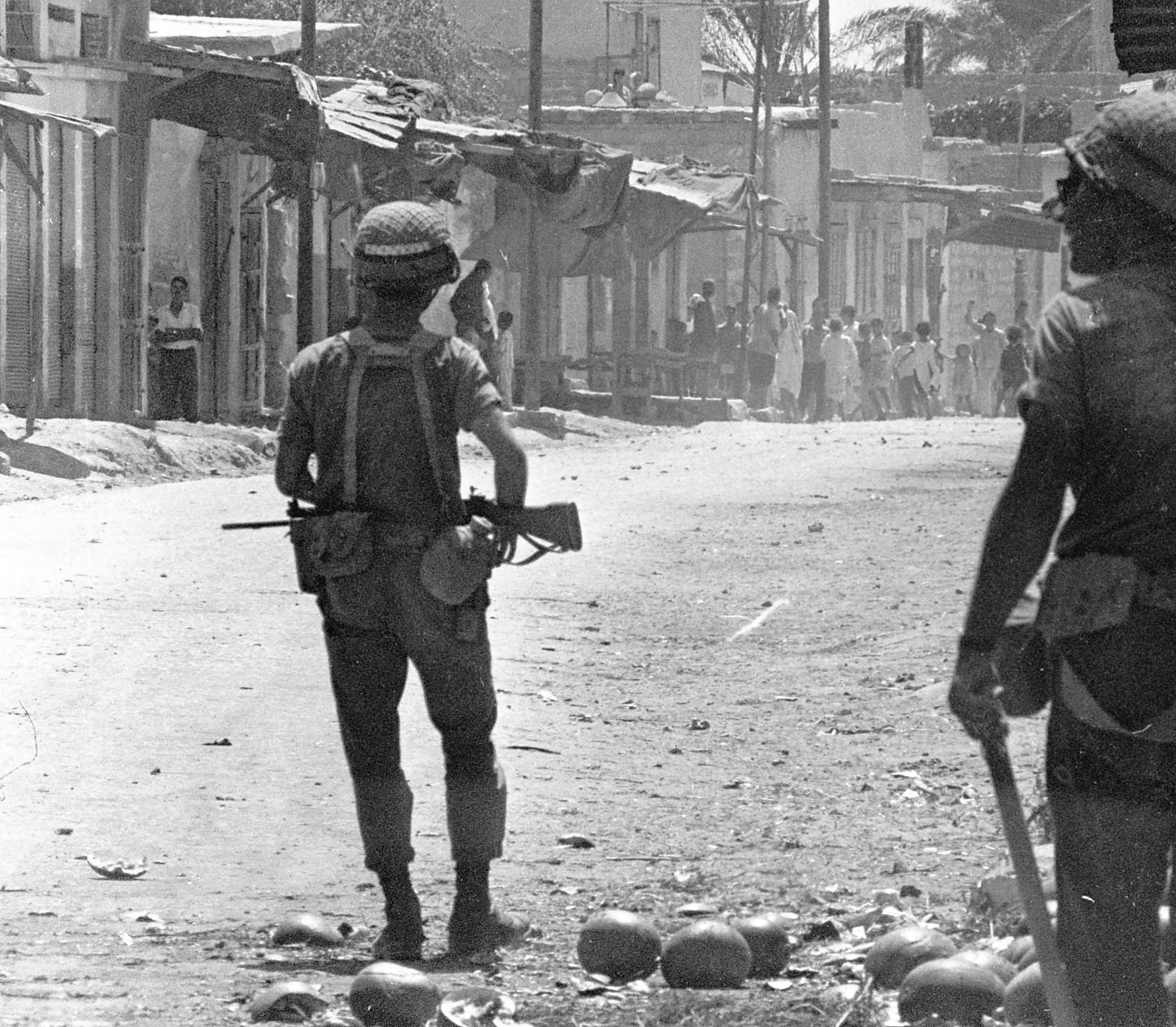
IDF unit searching for members of Arab activist groups in the occupied Gaza Strip, in 1969.

According to American scholar Sara Roy, "in addition to the guerilla fighting that permeated life in the Strip, civil disobedience became widespread. Student demonstrations, consumer boycotts of Israeli goods, and public demands by political officials for an end to the occupation, exarcerbated an already volatile situation."

One example of such civil disobedience was a May 1968 women's campaign that blocked roads and marched on the Israeli military governor's offices.

Some demonstrations by Gazan civilians during this period developed into riots, such a February 1969 riot by schoolgirls in Gaza that also sparked riots in the West Bank.

== "Pacification" of Gaza ==
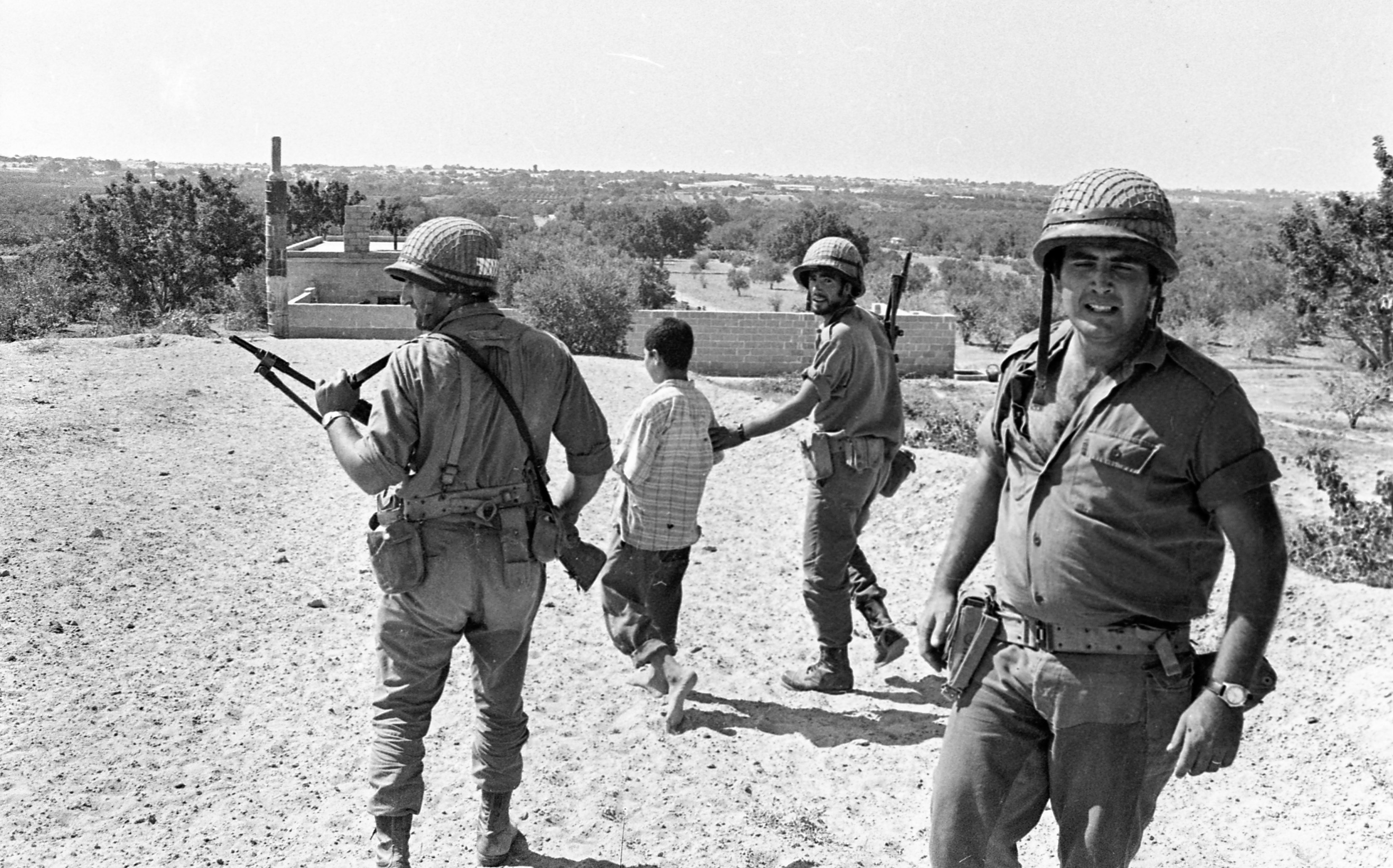
Israeli soldiers arresting Palestinians in 1969

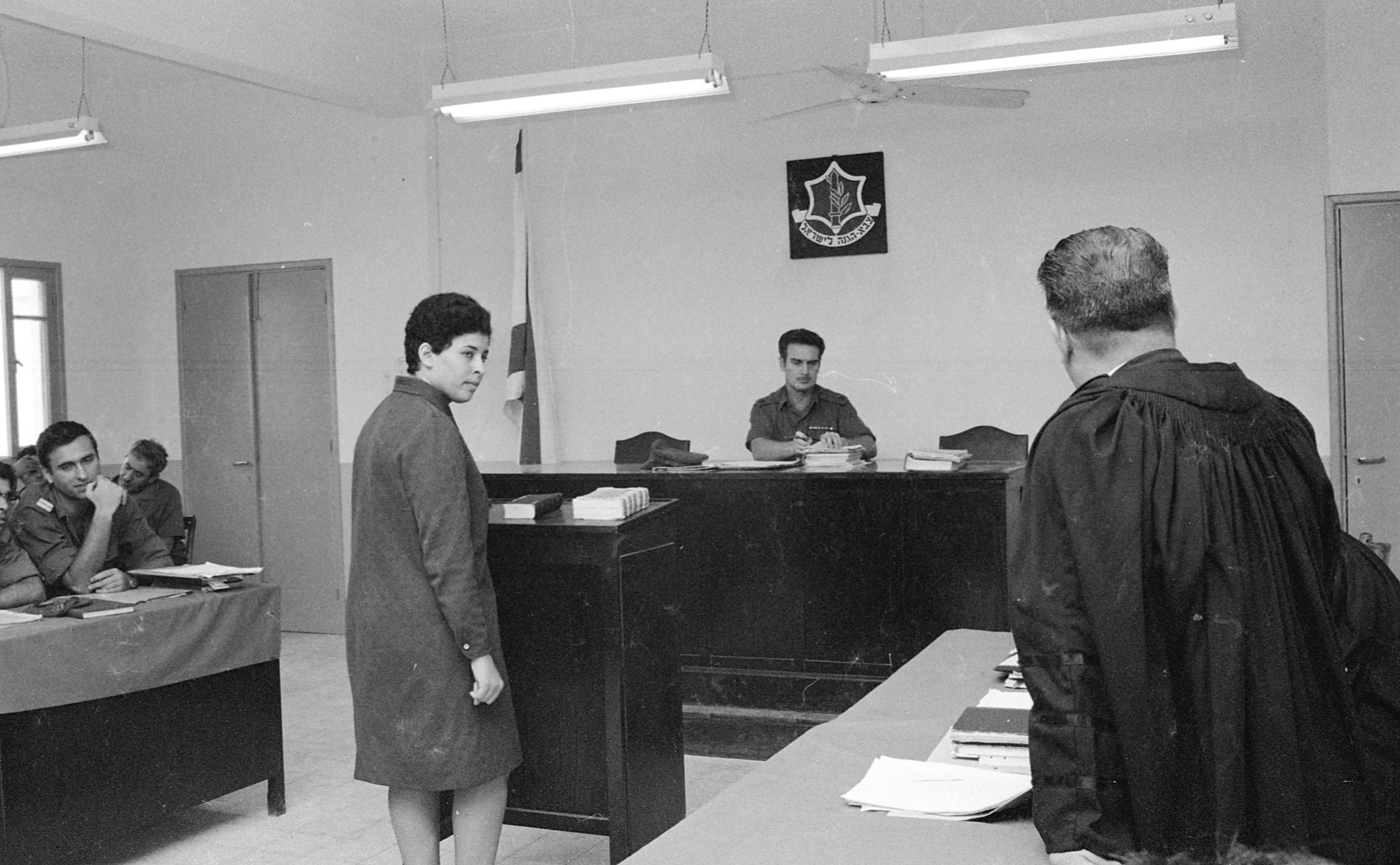
Israeli military court trying a Palestinian nurse accused of terrorist activities, in 1969

Under general Ariel Sharon, the Israeli military began a more extensive pacification campaign in 1970. Following the murder of the Aroyo children in early January 1971, the "pacification" campaign was significantly stepped up, including mass arrests, search and destroy operations, house demolitions, the construction of wide motorways to allow easy access for mechanised Israeli forces, deportations, and the construction of a security fence encircling the Strip. In the summer of 1971, the IDF demolished around 2,000 homes with bulldozers as well as displaced nearly 16,000 people in Rafah Camp and other refugee camps across the Gaza Strip. 2,000 of them were later sent to El-Arish and hundreds more sent to the West Bank.

According to researcher Mark Tessler, following the pacification campaign, "the fedayeen in Gaza were increasingly fragmented and ineffective, although scattered incidents continued. Israel kept up the pressure in the months that followed in order to prevent any resurgence of commando activity, often employing measures of collective punishment in an attempt to prevent the population from giving assistance to efforts at resistance. Sharon's actions, which were praised by some and condemned by others in political debates inside Israel, succeeded in 'pacifying' the area until, according to [Israeli Arab IDF soldier] Rafik Halabi, all that 'remained of the harrowing year and a half of violence was the festering resentment of the people of Gaza.'"

== Analysis ==
French scholar Jean-Pierre Filiu has classified the period as the fifth of twelve wars on Gaza between 1948 and 2014.

In a 1989 interview with Time Magazine, Sharon compared the period to the First Intifada, saying that "I faced a similar situation in Gaza as military commander there in 1971. It took me two months to decide what to do, to learn every street, every house, every citrus grove like I know the palm of my hand. I moved to Gaza and worked night and day for seven months to make it completely quiet. It stayed that way for 15 years. How did I do it? By making a very clear distinction between the terrorists acting against us or supporters of terror and the other people who did not participate, even if they hated us. The terrorists were eliminated! All their supporters were put in prison... One of Israel’s major mistakes is in not making the same clear-cut distinction during the past 16 months."

== Aftermath ==
Following the unrest, traditional local elites such as citrus merchants and landowners regained influence in the Gaza Strip, focusing on restoring order in day-to-day life. Combined with the reinstatement of some local municipal governance, with influential moderate Rashad al-Shawwa being named Mayor of Gaza City, active Gazan opposition to the Israeli occupation would decrease. By the late 1970s, however, particularly following the 1976 West Bank local elections and the 1978 Camp David Accords, along with growing resentment over the effects of the occupation, active opposition would return significantly.

== See also ==
- Gaza–Israel conflict
- Israeli–Palestinian conflict
- List of modern conflicts in the Middle East
