= Webster Paulson =

English civil engineer (1837–1887)

- Born: 11 December 1837; Lincolnshire, England
- Died: 16 August 1887 (aged 49); Malta
- Occupation: Civil engineer
- Notable work: Casino Notabile
- Spouse: Fanny Paulson

Webster Paulson (11 December 1837 – 16 August 1887) was an English civil engineer who is known for his work in Malta in the late 19th century.

== Life and career ==
Born in Lincolnshire, he attended the Grammar School in Grantham before mastering the trade of a builder at Thomas Cubitt's firm in London. In 1861, he was sent to Malta to supervise the construction of the Royal Opera House in Valletta, which was designed by Edward Middleton Barry. In 1865, he was commissioned as a contractor in the construction of the Holy Trinity Church in Sliema, which was built to designs of Gordon MacDonald Hills (1826–1895).

Paulson decided to remain in Malta, and he was therefore appointed Temporary Clerk of Works, receiving an annual wage of £60. He continued to hold several positions in the public works sector throughout his career. In 1873, he lost all of his possessions when the Royal Opera House burnt down, since he had been living there after being appointed Temporary Guardian of the New Opera House. After the fire, Paulson redesigned the theatre's interior along with Emanuele Luigi Galizia. In 1876, he became an Associate of the British Institute of Civil Engineers, later becoming an Associate Member. He was transferred to the Public Works department after the latter's establishment in 1880, and he was involved in numerous projects around Malta.

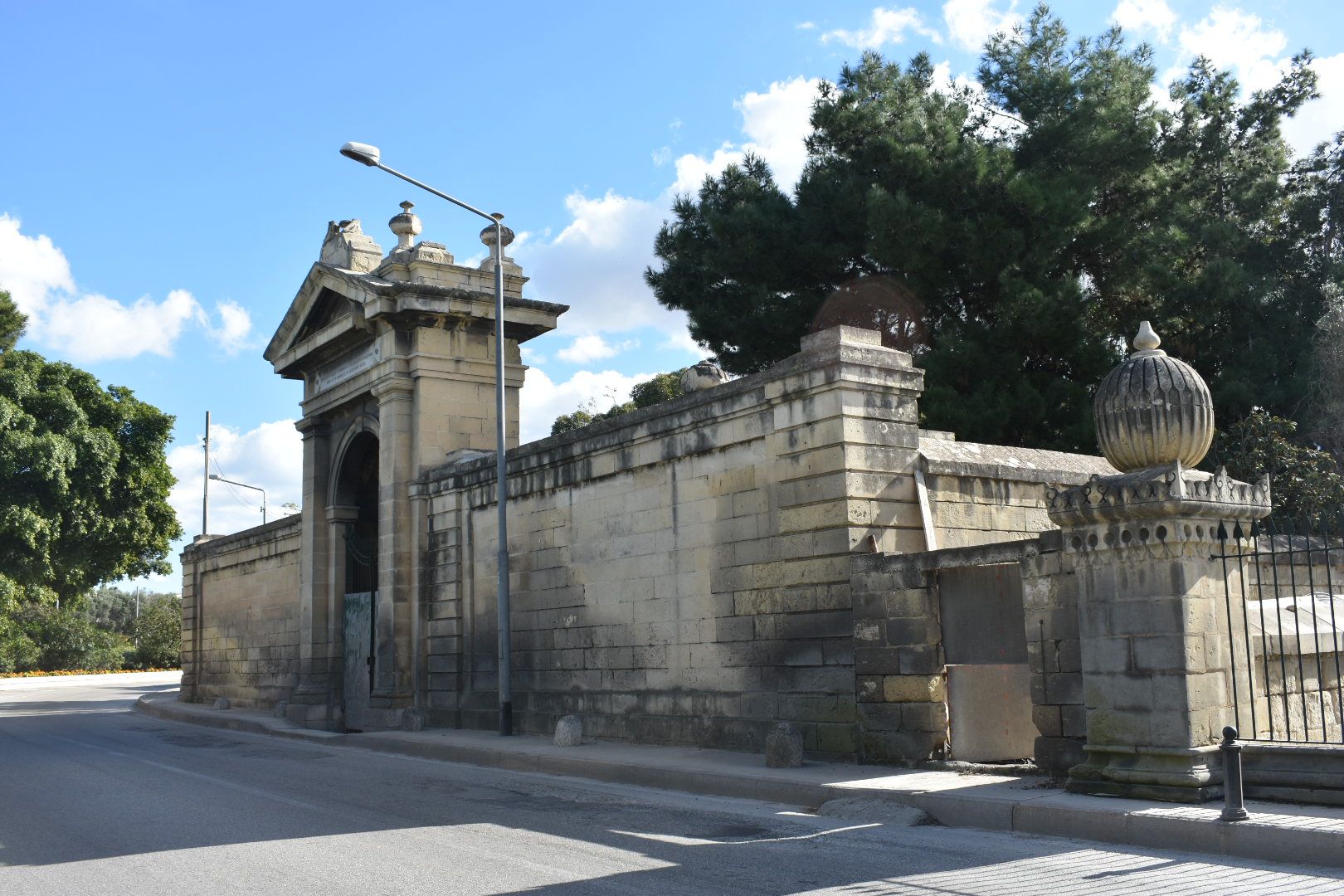
The Jewish Cemetery in Marsa (1879)

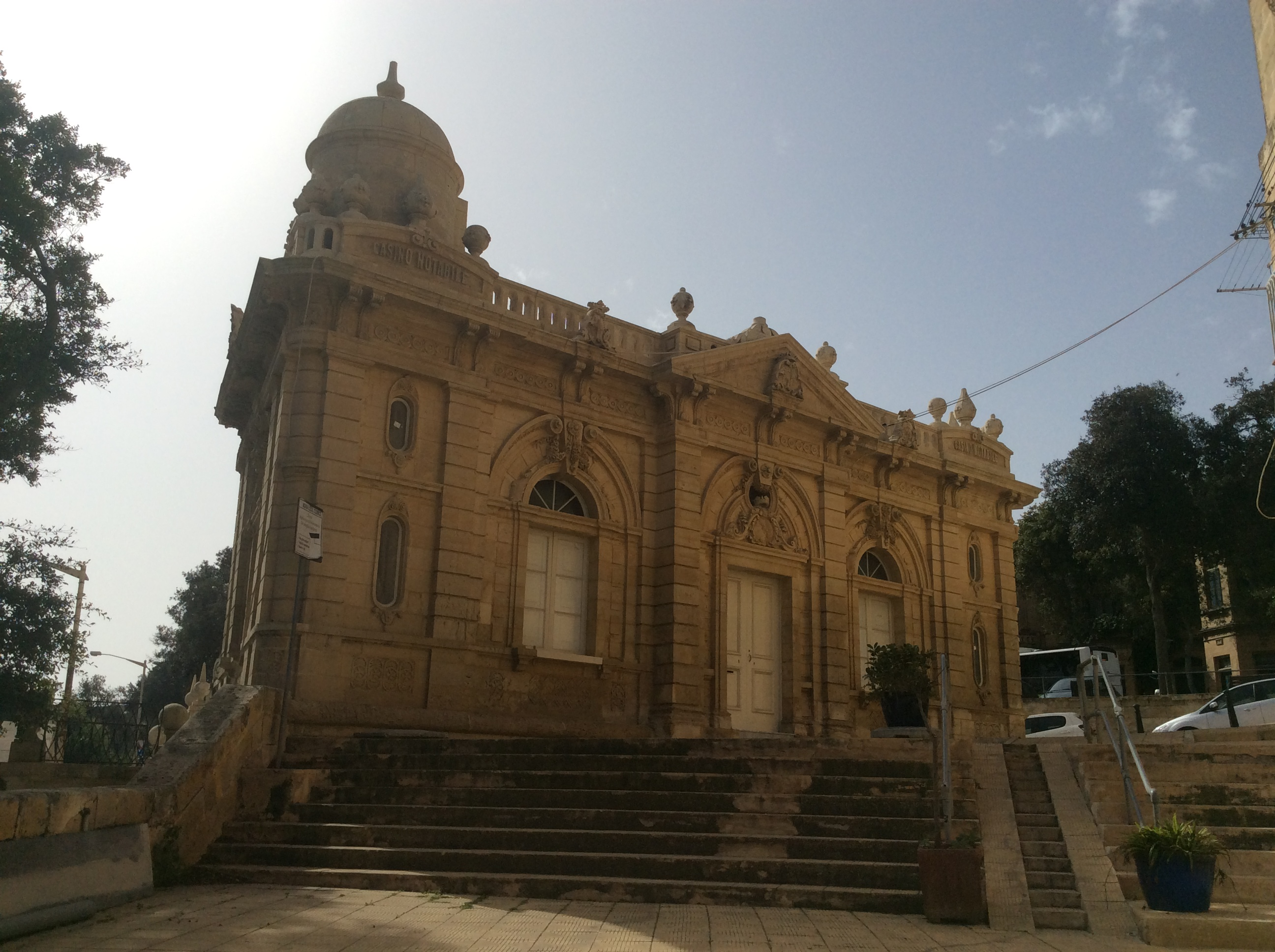
The Casino Notabile (1887–88), Paulson's masterpiece and final work

Apart from public works, Paulson also practiced with private clients. His work includes the Camenzuli Chapel in the Addolorata Cemetery (1875), the now-demolished Sliema Verandah Police Station (1879), the Jewish Cemetery in Marsa (1879) and his masterpiece, the eclectic Casino Notabile in Mdina (1887–88). He also supervised the construction of the Vincenzo Bugeja Conservatory in Santa Venera (1880) and the Methodist Church in Floriana (1881). He was involved in the construction of the St. Vincent de Paul Hospital in Luqa, which was eventually completed in 1892.

Paulson was a Freemason, and in 1885 he became the master of United Brethren Lodge No. 1923. He was married to Fanny Paulson.

Paulson contracted cholera during an outbreak in August 1887. He died on 16 August after a painful illness which lasted six days. His burial place is unknown, but it was likely at the Birgu cemetery, the Lazzaretto cemetery or the Cholera Cemetery in Floriana. The burials in these cemeteries were exhumed after extensive damage due to aerial bombardment in World War II.
