= Malta–Palestine relations =

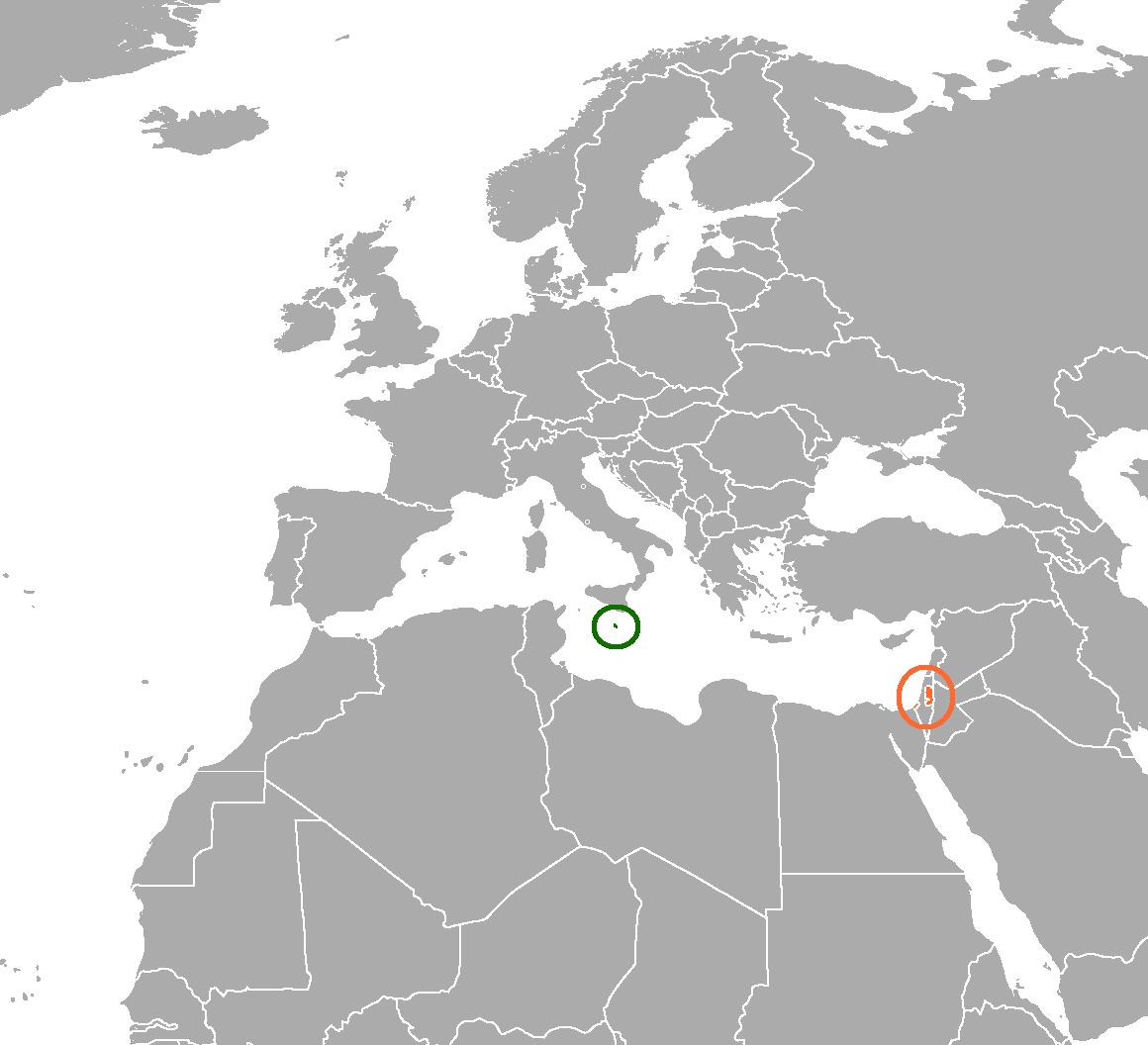

- Malta: Palestine

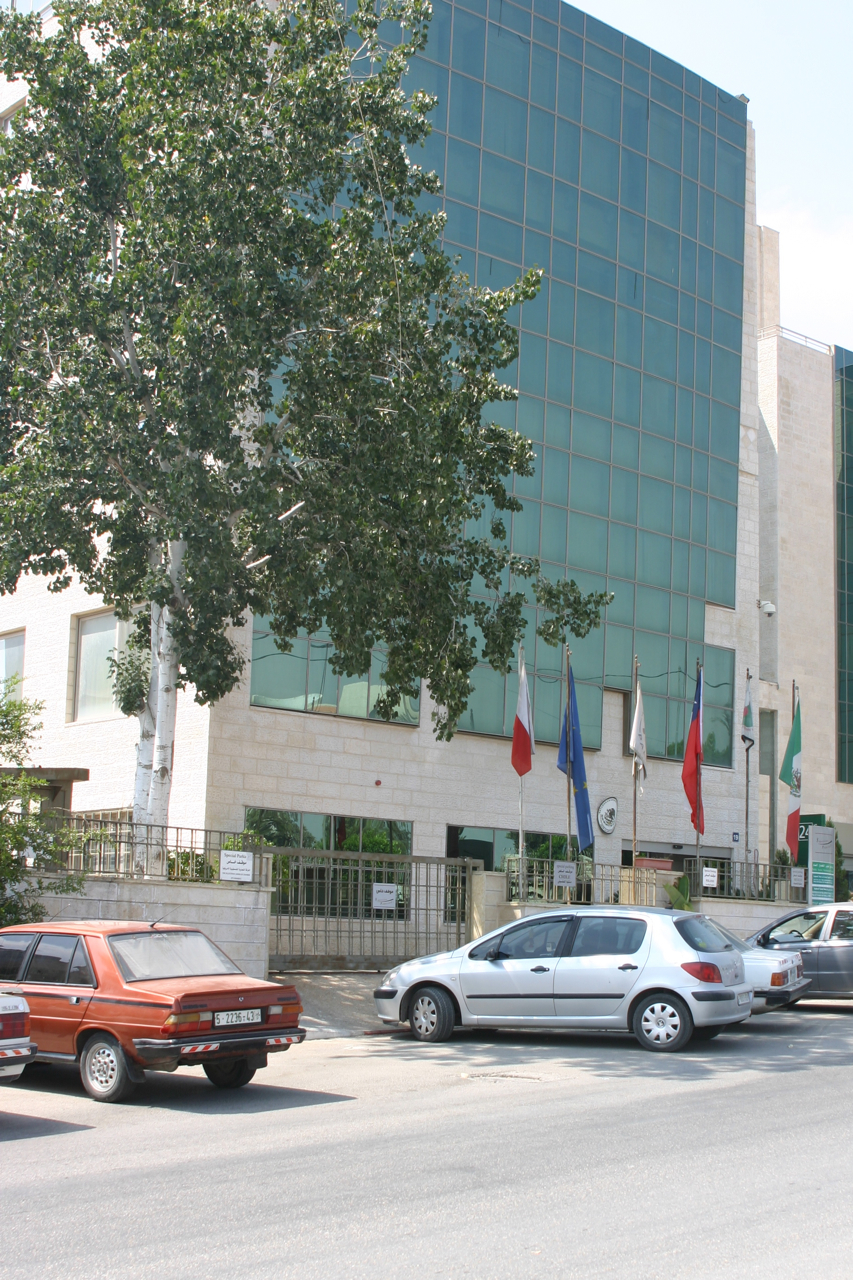
Building hosting the Representative office of Malta in Ramallah

Malta–Palestine relations are the bilateral relations between Malta and Palestine. Malta has traditionally held close and friendly relations with the Palestinian people ever since Malta's attainment of Independence on 21 September 1964. The Foreign Policy of Malta has consistently supported international efforts aimed at a peaceful and negotiated resolution to the conflict aimed at establishing a State of Palestine living side by side by the State of Israel in peace and security. Malta recognised and established diplomatic relations with Palestine on 22 September 2025.

== History ==
While Malta was listed as having recognized Palestine on 16 November 1988 in documents circulated by the United Nations, they only acknowledged "the right of the Palestinian people to establish a sovereign state". Malta did not officially acknowledge Palestinian statehood, despite having a Palestinian ambassador and tacitly acknowledging it.

During Christmas of 1999, President of Malta (Emeritus), Guido de Marco attended the Bethlehem Midnight Mass (24-25 December 1999) and met with then President of Palestine, Yasser Arafat. In July 2008, the President of Palestine, Mahmoud Abbas visited Valletta, Malta and called on President of Malta (Emeritus), Edward Fenech Adami. In January 2019, President of Malta (Emeritus), Marie Louise Coleiro Preca made a historic two day visit to Palestine visiting the cities of Bethlehem and Ramallah and met with President Abbas. During Christmas of 2019, Former Prime Minister of Malta, Joseph Muscat attended the Bethlehem Midnight Mass (24–25 December 2019) and had meetings with the President of Palestine, Mahmoud Abbas and the Prime Minister of Palestine, Muhammad Shtayyeh.

Throughout the years, Malta and Palestine have sought to expand their bilateral relations through the intensification of cooperation in various sectors. Visits of respective Prime Ministers, Foreign Ministers, Ministers and Dignitaries to both countries take place on a regular basis.

In 2024, the government of Malta has stated that it is prepared to recognize the existence of a Palestinian state "when the circumstances are right and such recognition can make a positive contribution." On 25 May 2025, Prime Minister Robert Abela announced that Malta would recognize Palestine following a UN conference on 20 June. Abela also announced that Malta is ready to welcome paediatrician Alaa Al-Najjar after nine of her ten children were killed in Gaza. On 20 June, Malta delayed its recognition of Palestine due to the aforementioned conference being postponed. On 29 July 2025, Abela announced that Malta will recognize Palestine during the general assembly of the United Nations in September of that year together with France and the United Kingdom. This recognition was made on September 22, alongside recognitions from other EU members.

The Republic of Malta has a representative office in Ramallah, Palestine, which is a diplomatic mission headed by a Maltese Head of Representative Office (Representative) resident in Palestine.

== Resident diplomatic missions ==
- Malta has a representative office in Ramallah.
- Palestine has an embassy in Swieqi.

== See also ==
- Foreign relations of Malta
- Foreign relations of Palestine
