= Jewish Cemetery, Marsa =

Jewish cemetery in the town of Marsa, Malta

Jewish Cemetery
- Iċ-Ċimiterju tal-Lhud
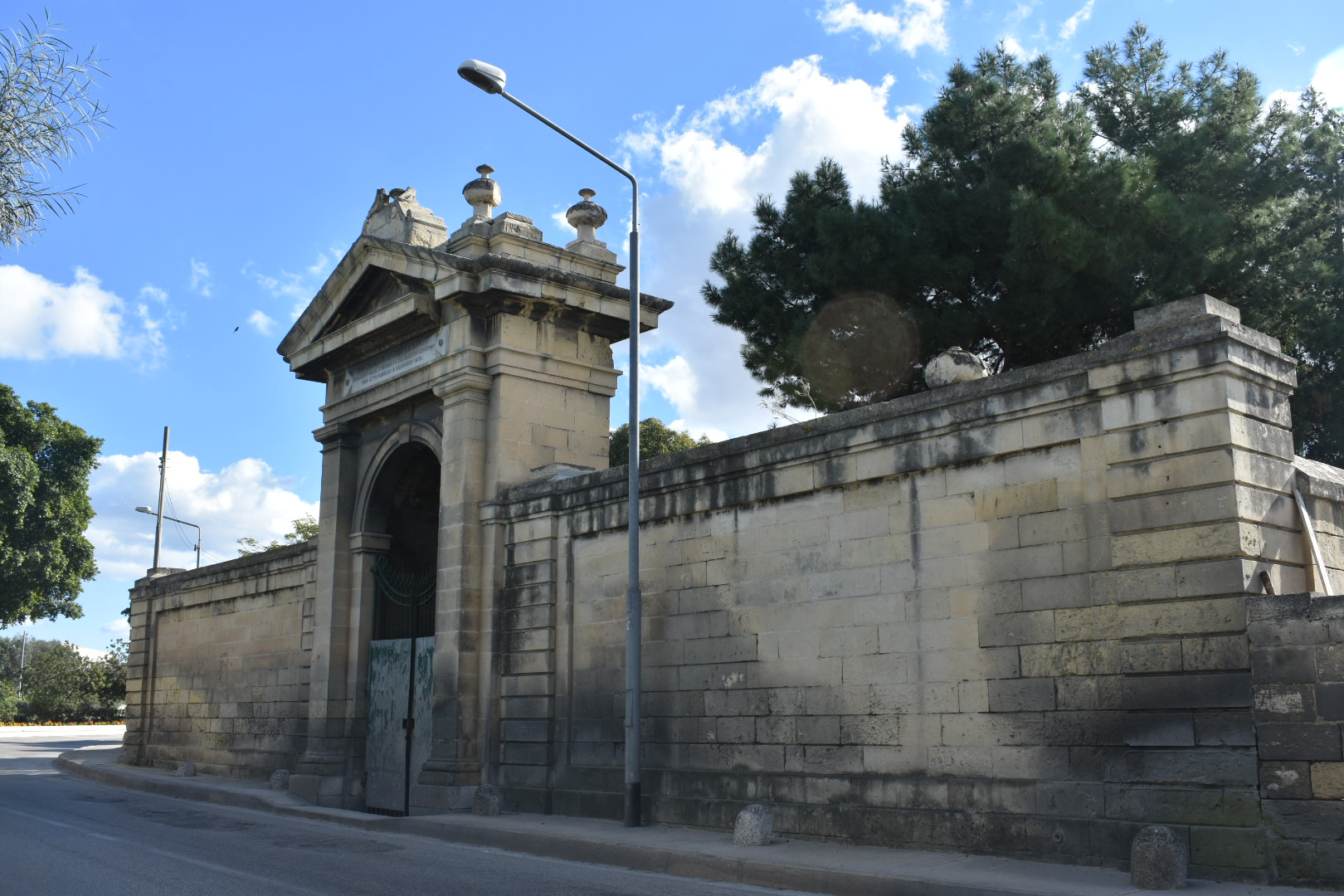
- The Jewish Cemetery in 2017
- Interactive map of Jewish Cemetery

Details
- Established: 8 December 1879
- Location: Marsa, Malta
- Coordinates: 35°52′25″N 14°29′39″E
- Style: Neoclassical
- Find a Grave: Jewish Cemetery

The Jewish Cemetery (Maltese: Iċ-Ċimiterju tal-Lhud, Italian: Cimitero degli Israeliti) is a cemetery in Marsa, Malta. It was established in December 1879, and it was built to designs of the English architect Webster Paulson.

== History ==
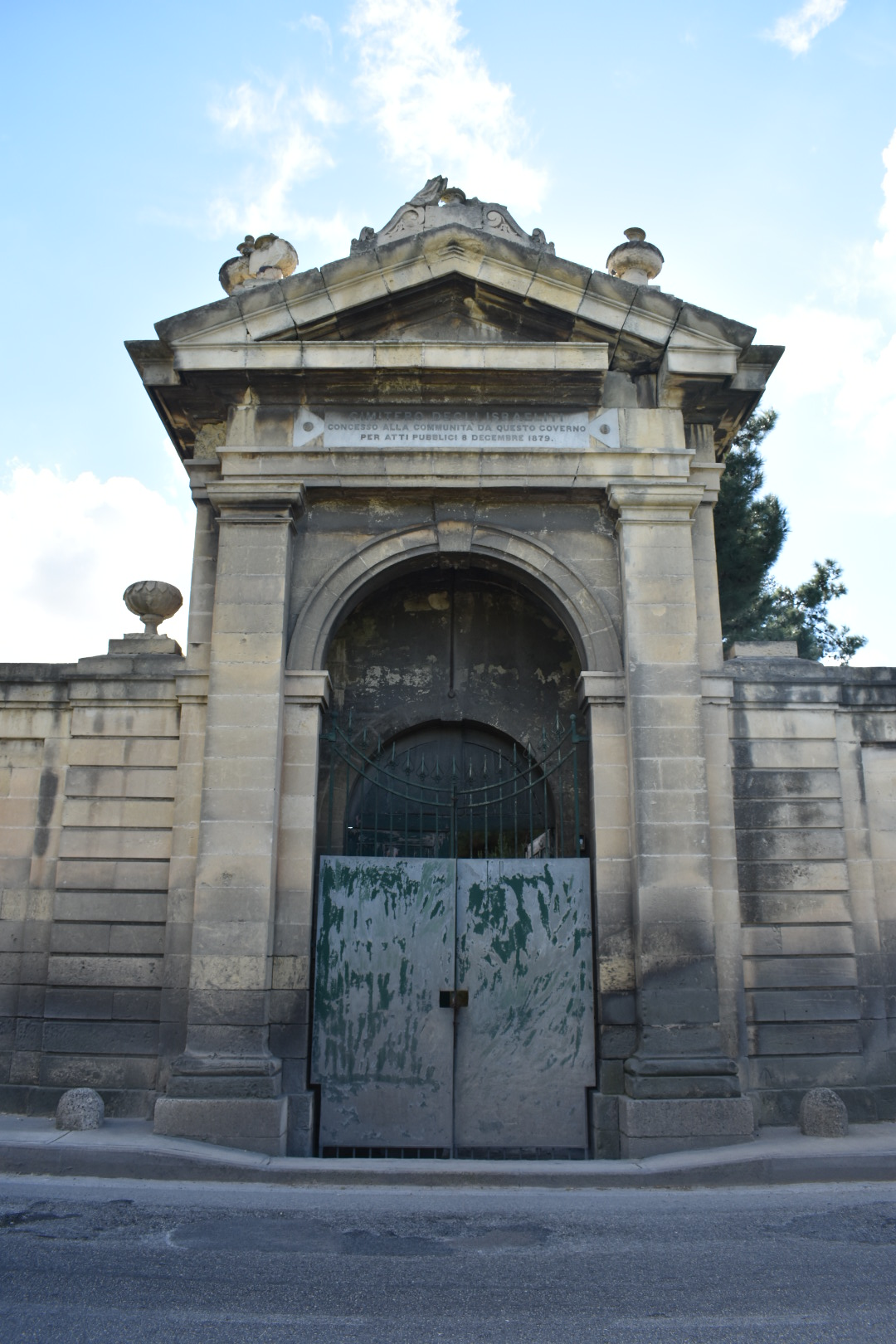
The Neoclassic gate of the cemetery

The Jewish Cemetery is located in the Ta' Sammat area of Marsa, directly adjacent to Emanuele Luigi Galizia's Turkish Military Cemetery. It was established in December 1879 and it was designed by the English architect Webster Paulson. The British disallowed the building of a Synagogue to please the local Roman Catholic church, even if Jewish presence in Malta was of large numbers.

The proximity of the Jewish and Turkish cemeteries led Lieutenant-Governor Sir Harry Luke to state that the area "is the only place in the world where Arabs and Jews lie peacefully together", albeit Turks are not actually Arabs – he may have interchangeably used it to mean Muslims.

The Commonwealth War Graves Commission cares for six graves inside the cemetery: three Commonwealth military burials (one from World War I and two from World War II), one non-war burial and two war graves from other nationalities.

The cemetery is still in use, but it is often kept locked. The cemetery contains the graves of people from Poland, Spain, Russia, Hungary, Australia, China and other European countries.

== Architecture ==
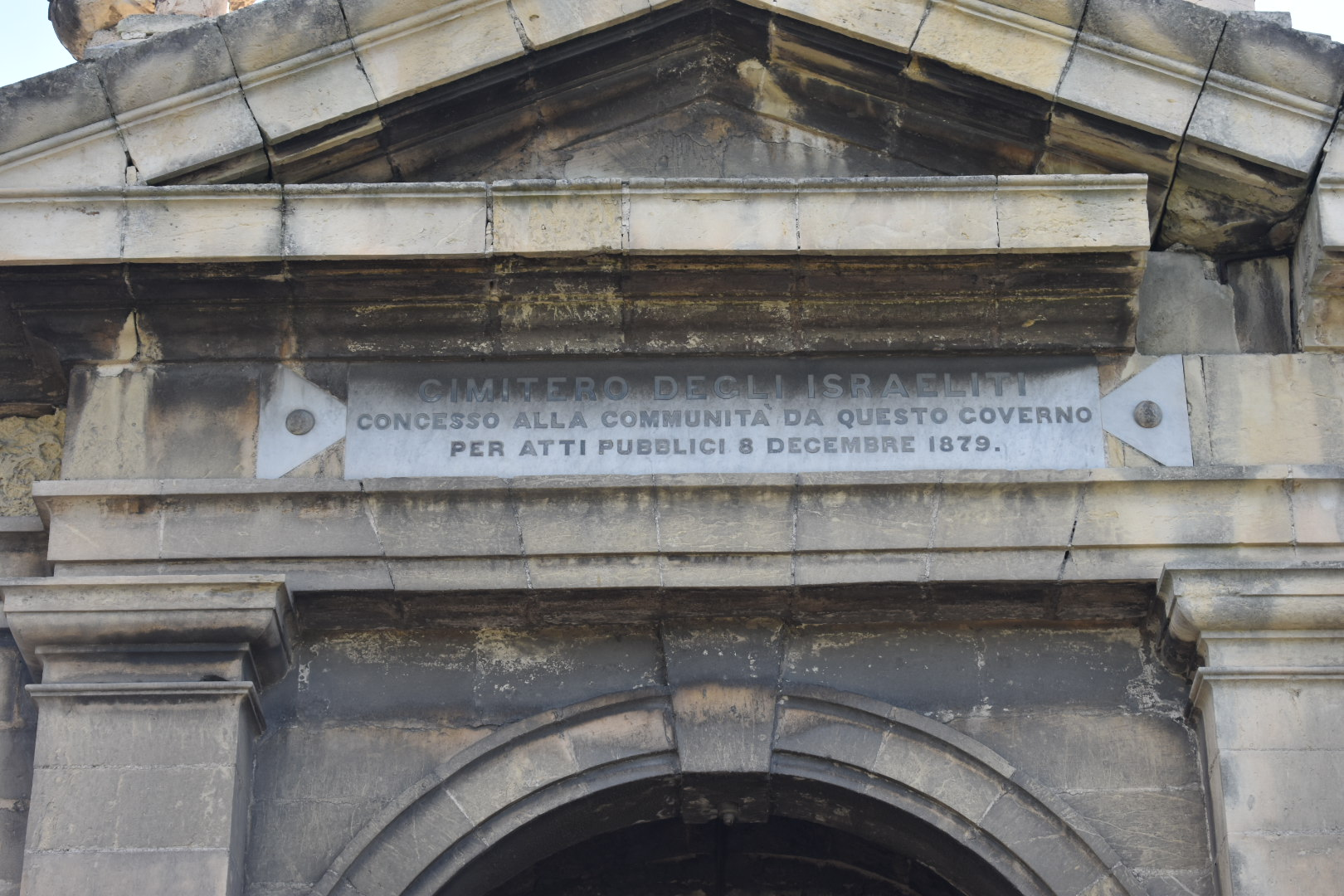
The inscription on the main gate

The Jewish Cemetery is built in a neoclassical style – one significant architectural feature is its main gate, which has decorations which are similar to Torah finials. Below the pediment, there is an Italian-language inscription indicating that the government granted the cemetery to the Jewish community in a public act on 8 December 1879.
