= Murder of the Aroyo children =

Terror attack in Israel

- Part of 1967–71 Gazan insurgency
- Location: Gaza Strip
- Date: 2 January 1971; 55 years ago
- Attack type: Grenade attack
- Weapon: Hand grenade
- Deaths: 2 Israeli children
- Injuries: 2 Israeli civilians
- No. of participants: 3 assailants

The murder of the Aroyo children was a terrorist attack which occurred on 2 January 1971, in which two Israeli children were killed when Palestinian militants threw a hand grenade into the moving car of the Aroyo family which was touring the Gaza Strip. The attack was a turning point in the way Israel began relating towards terrorist threats originating from the Gaza Strip. Following the attack Israel launched an extensive counter-terror operation in the Gaza Strip.

== Background ==
The Aroyo family (Marco and Clare) had moved in the 1930s from Bulgaria to Malta, where they owned a textile shop in Valletta ("Swiss House"). Their children later moved to the UK.

In 1969, Robert and Preeti Aroyo immigrated to Israel from the United Kingdom and settled in Kiryat Ono. The Aroyo family used to regularly travel across Israel during the weekends.

== The attack ==
On Saturday, 2 January 1971, the Aroyo family was touring the Gaza Strip in their car. In the afternoon, when the family began to make their way back home, they got on the wrong road and as a result they passed along the main road north of Gaza City where a 15-year-old Palestinian boy threw a hand grenade through the window of the moving car of the Aroyo family. The hand grenade fell into the back seat where the children and their mother were sitting. The blast immediately killed 4-year-old Abigail. 7-year-old Marc-Daniel was severely injured and later on died from his injury at the hospital. The mother, Preeti Aroyo, was badly injured and needed lengthy rehabilitation and remained disabled from the incident.

Immediately after the incident, the father, Robert Aroyo, attempted to call for help and turned to two young Arab men who witnessed the incident. His pleas were not answered, as it later turned out that these men operated as observers during the attack. Robert Aroyo, who was slightly wounded in the attack managed to turn the car around and reach an IDF checkpoint, before collapsing.

=== Victims ===
- Abigail Aroyo, 4
- Marc-Daniel Aroyo, 7

== Aftermath ==
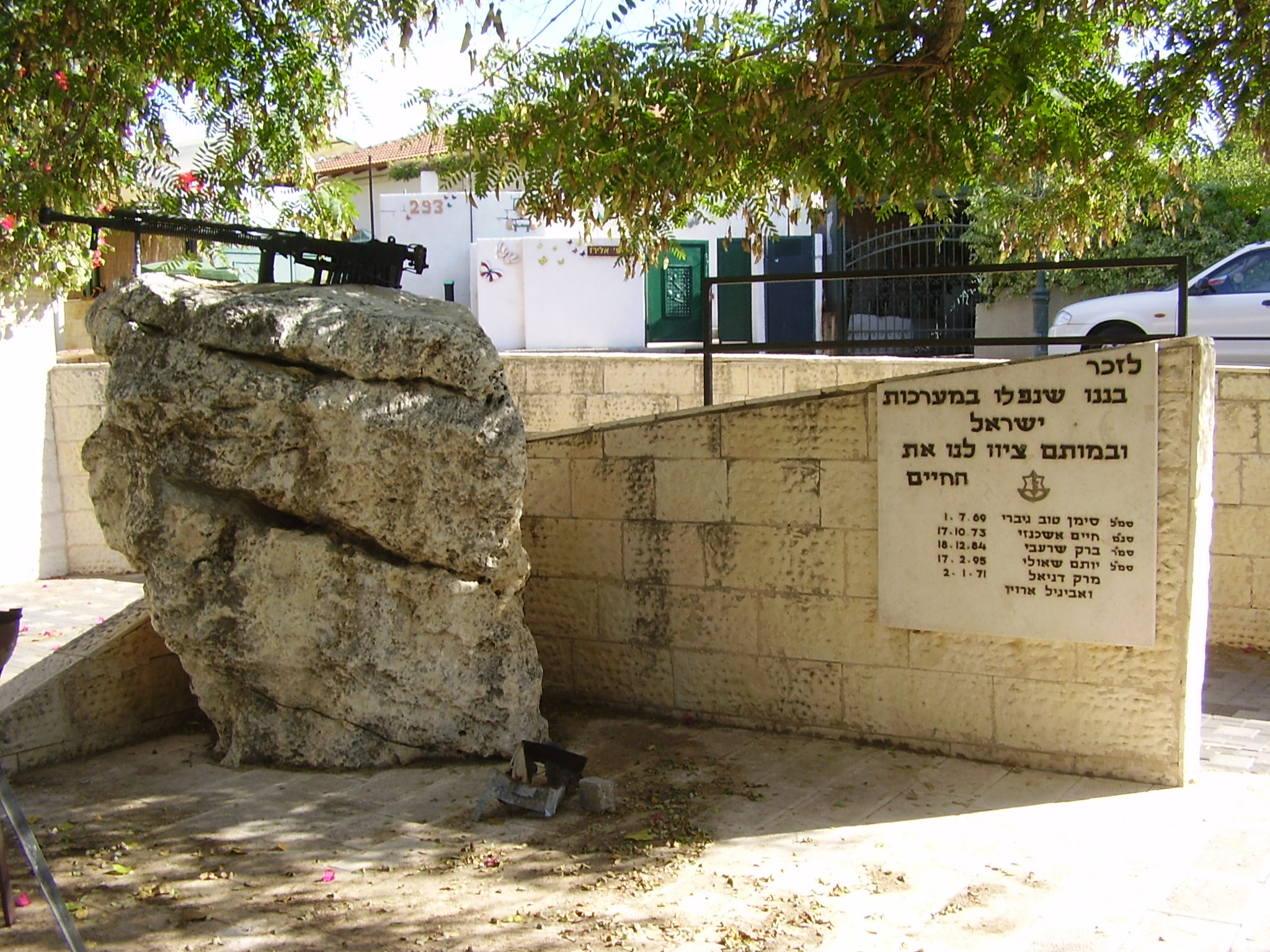
Monument to Israeli terror victims located in Kfar HaNagid. Among the names that appear on the monument are the children of the Aroyo family

The murder shocked the Israeli public mostly due to the severity of the attack. The children were buried in the cemetery of the Mount of Olives in Jerusalem. In their funeral they were eulogized by the IDF Chief Rabbi Shlomo Goren. Israeli security forces caught the perpetrators – 15-year-old Mohammad Suleiman Al Zaki who originated from the Shuja'iyya neighborhood (who threw the grenade), and his two partners who were 16 and 17 years old, all students of the "Falestin" high school who were recruited by a senior PLO member. Besides murdering the children of the Aroyo family, the attackers also attended in several other attacks and were charged on 18 counts of throwing grenades and for planting explosive devices. Zaki and his accomplices were sentenced by a military court in Gaza to life in prison. Zaki was released from prison in 1985 as part of the Jibril Agreement.

As a result of the attack a curfew was imposed on Gaza City and the highway in which the attack took place was closed for a month. The no-intervention policy which was carried out by the Israeli military in the Gaza Strip since Israel took over the Gaza Strip in the Six Day War (in part as a result of the IDF efforts to focus on the War of Attrition in the Suez Canal region), changed as a result of this incident. The counter-terrorism campaign was assigned to the Head of IDF's Southern Command, Ariel Sharon. A security fence was established across the Green Line to prevent infiltrations of militants. Large amounts of IDF forces were transferred into the Gaza Strip, which was divided into smaller sections in which the Sayeret Shaked (Shaked commando force; see Special forces of Israel#Disbanded units) operated intensively against the active terrorist cells. In addition, the Sayeret Rimon (Rimon reconnaissance unit; see Special forces of Israel#Disbanded units) was established and acted under the command of Meir Dagan to provide targeted treatment against terror cells. In July 1971 various IDF forces entered the Jabalya and Al-Shati refugee camps. During this counter terrorism operation over a hundred militants were killed in battle and hundreds of militants were arrested.
