= John Caruana =

Maltese lawyer and philosopher

Giovanni Caruana
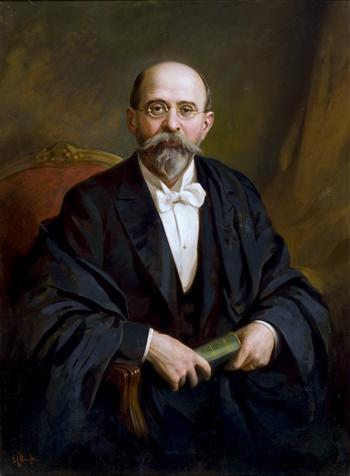
- Painting by Edward Caruana Dingli
- Born: 1866; Valletta, Malta
- Died: 31 July 1923 (aged 56–57); Malta
- Occupation(s): Professor of Civil Law and Political Economy

Giovanni Caruana (1866 – 31 July 1923) was a Maltese lawyer and minor philosopher. He was mostly interested in the philosophy of law and in political economy. At least two portraits of Caruana exist, both by the renowned early 20th century Maltese artist Edward Caruana Dingli. Both were displayed at an exhibition on Caruana Dingli at the National Museum of Fine Arts in Valletta, Malta, in 2010.

== Life ==
Caruana was probably born at his father's Valletta house at 266, St Paul's Street, in 1866. He was the son of an influential man, Prof. Antonio Annetto Caruana, who was an archeologist, librarian, Director of Education, and Rector of the University of Malta.

Caruana studied law at the University of Malta, and continued his studies in England and in Italy. He became professor of political economy at the University of Malta in 1889, and later Professor of Constitutional Law. In 1895 he was also appointed Professor of Civil Law. His teaching career spanned over thirty years. He retired in 1921.

== Works ==
Intellectually, liberalism was what seemed to preoccupy Caruana most. Amongst his various works, one is noteworthy for its philosophical value. It is Dell’Influsso della Filosofia Moderna (On the Influence of Modern Philosophy). This 28-page booklet in Italian was published in Malta in 1889 (Tipografia Industriale di Giov. Muscat, Salita Guardanmangia, Pietà). The title is augmented with the qualification sulla Scienza e le Discipline Economico-sociali e della loro presente direzione (on Science and the Economic-Social Disciplines, and their present direction).

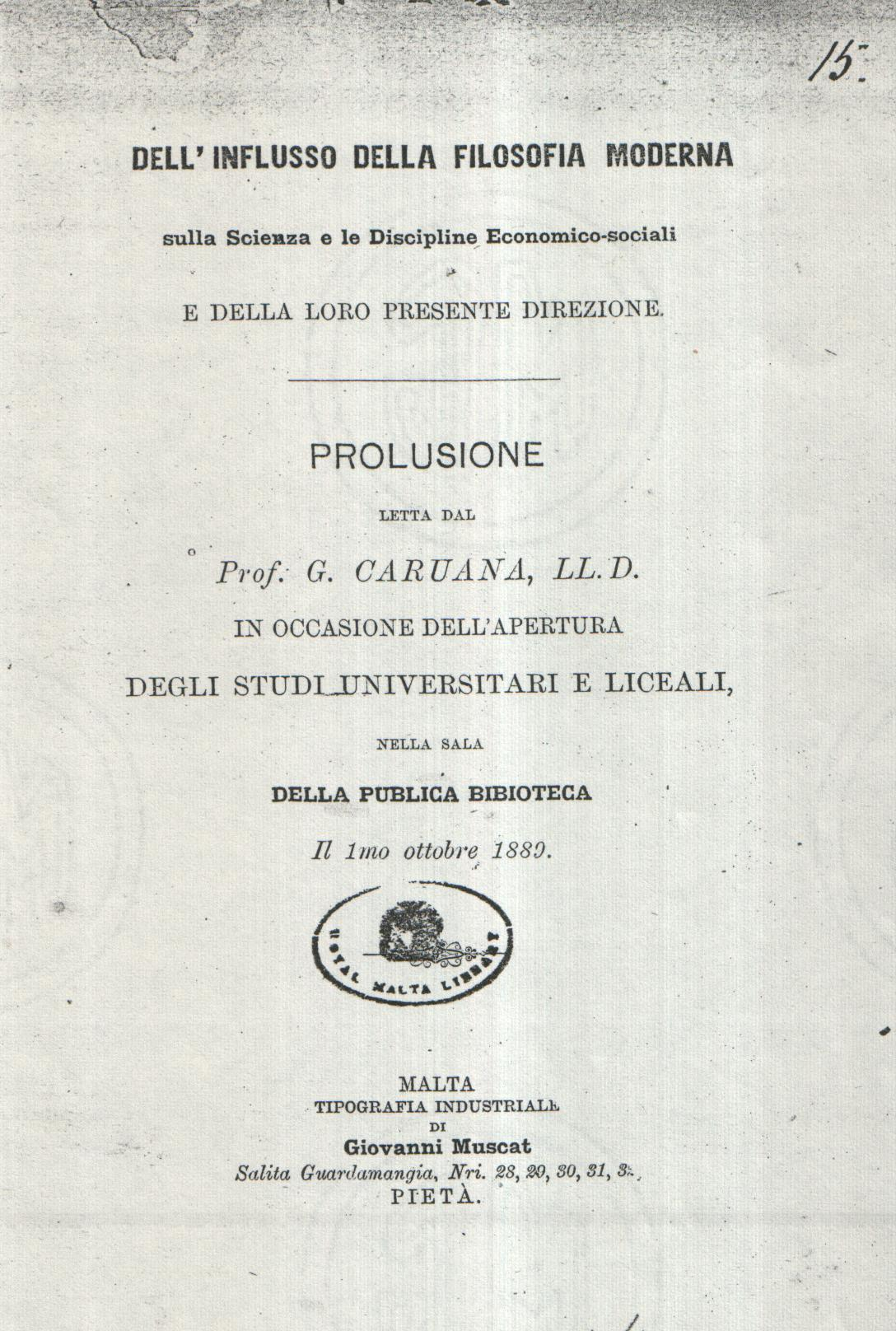
Dell’Influsso della Filosfia Moderna (1889) of John Caruana

The publication reproduces a talk which Caruana delivered at the opening of the academic year 1889/90 of the University of Malta and the Lyceum. The talk was made on October 1, 1889, at the National Library of Malta, Valletta, when he was only 23 years old.

Caruana’s talk is an outright attack on liberalism. The writing has no divisions, and continuously cites Aristotle and various political economists. Cicero is cited too. Caruana exemplifies his arguments by drawing upon the situation in England. He explains how there liberalism was arresting the development of science, the economy, and the social studies. Caruana exults England as the bulwark of civilisation, and castigates liberalism for failing to keep England’s scientific, economic and social pre-eminence on an upward and forward trajectory.

== Personal ==
Caruana was married to Giovanna Galizia, a daughter of the celebrated Victorian architect and civil engineer Emanuele Luigi Galizia. E.L. Galizia was a personal friend of Caruana's father, the archaeologist Antonio Annetto Caruana. One of Giovanna's brothers, James Galizia, was Director of Public Works and then Treasury Secretary in Malta's early 20th century imperial administration. Another brother, Godwin Galizia, was a noteworthy neo-Romanesque and neo-classical architect. Caruana had ten children with Giovanna Galizia. Their first son, Anton Caruana Galizia, a prominent Maltese lawyer, was killed outside the Casino Maltese in a German bombing raid in 1942, that left 40 others dead. His great-grandson Peter Caruana Galizia was married to prominent journalist Daphne Caruana Galizia, who died in a car bomb attack in 2017.

== See also ==
- Philosophy in Malta
