= Emanuele Luigi Galizia =

Maltese architect and engineer (1830–1907)

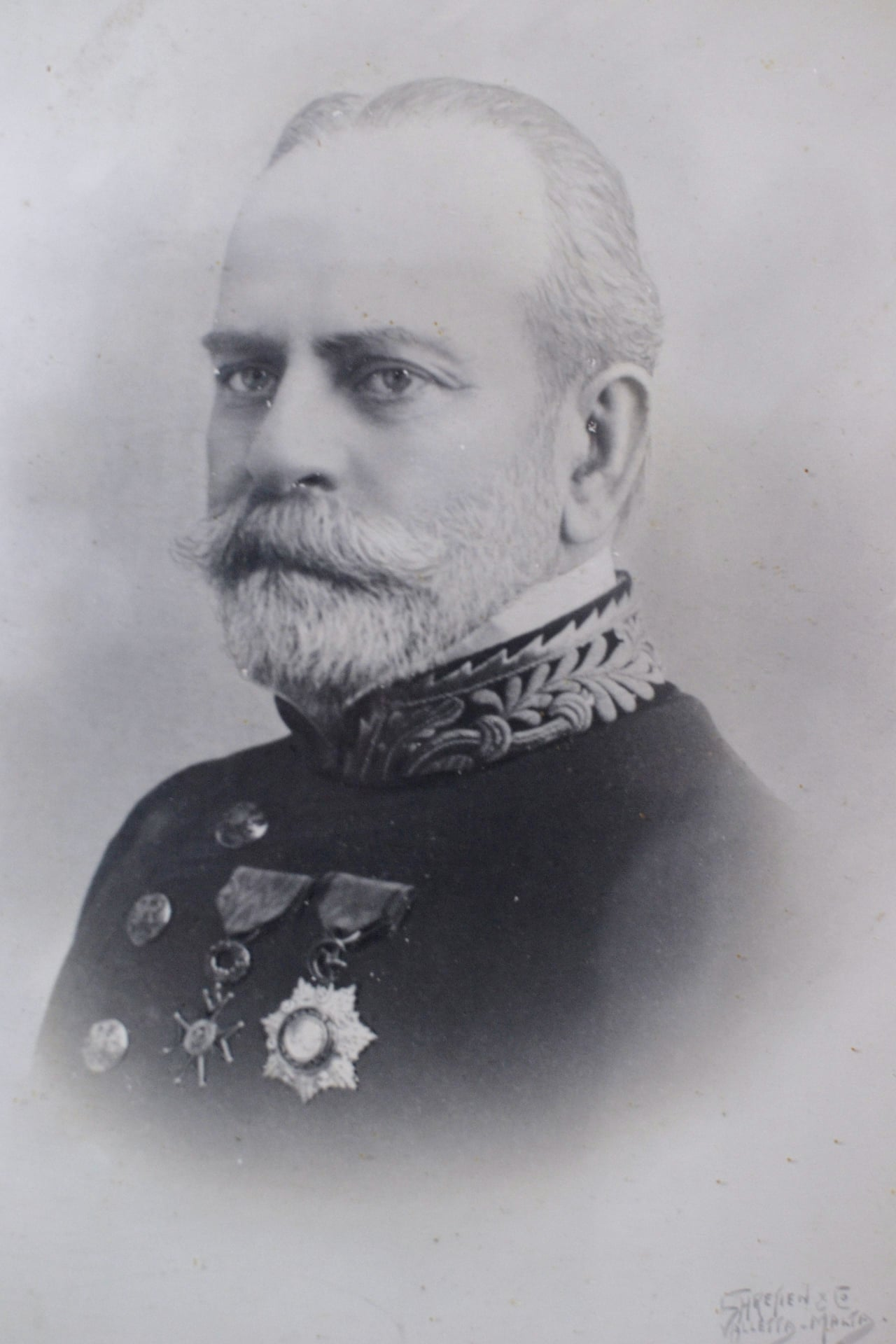
Galizia c. 1890

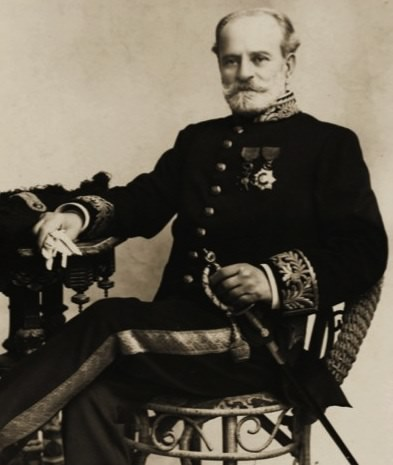
Galizia as Superintendent of Public Works in 1880

Emanuele Luigi Galizia (7 November 1830 – 6 May 1907) was a Maltese architect and civil engineer, who designed many public buildings and several churches. He is regarded as "the principal Maltese architect throughout the second half of the nineteenth century".

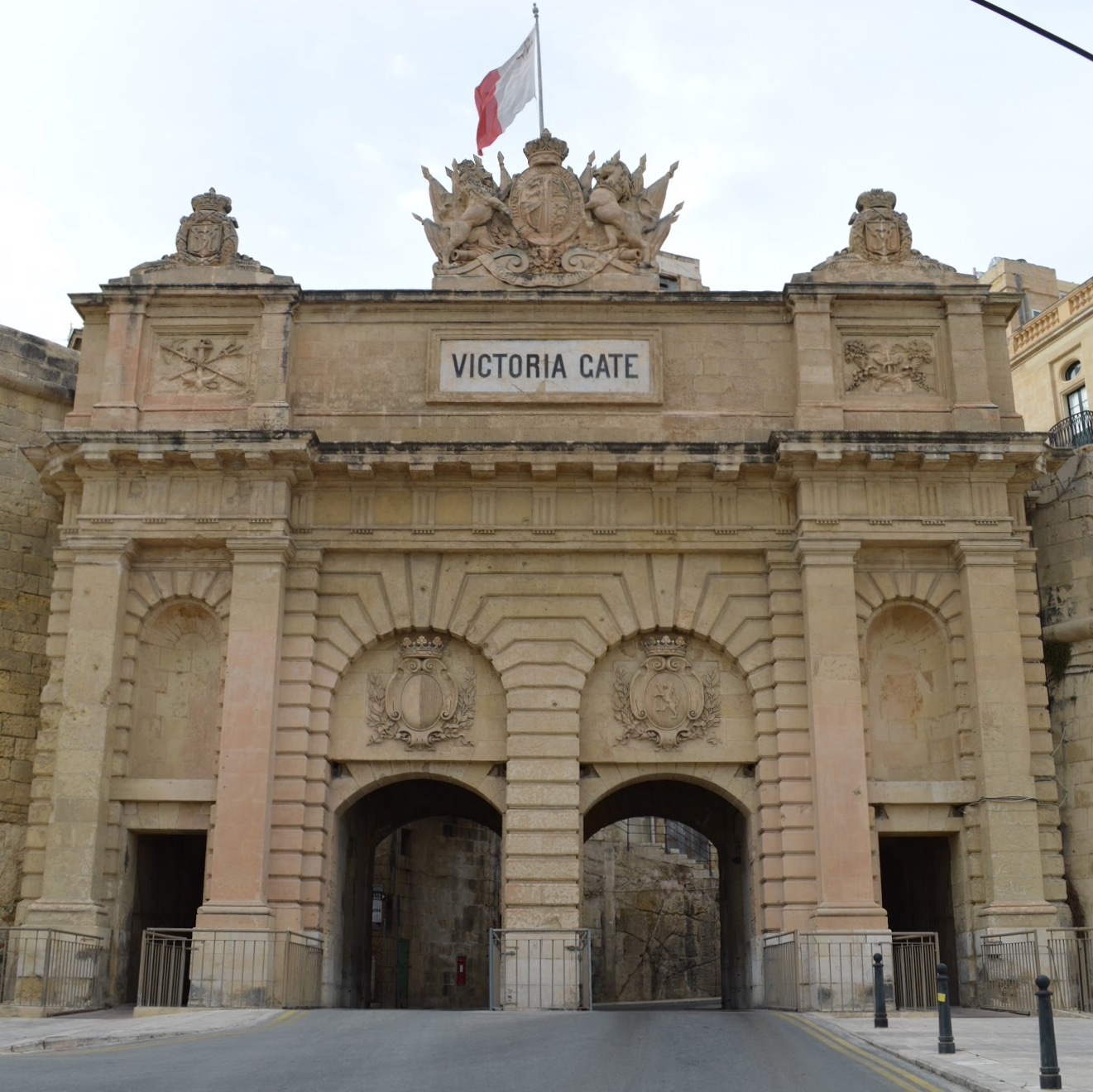
Victoria Gate in Valletta

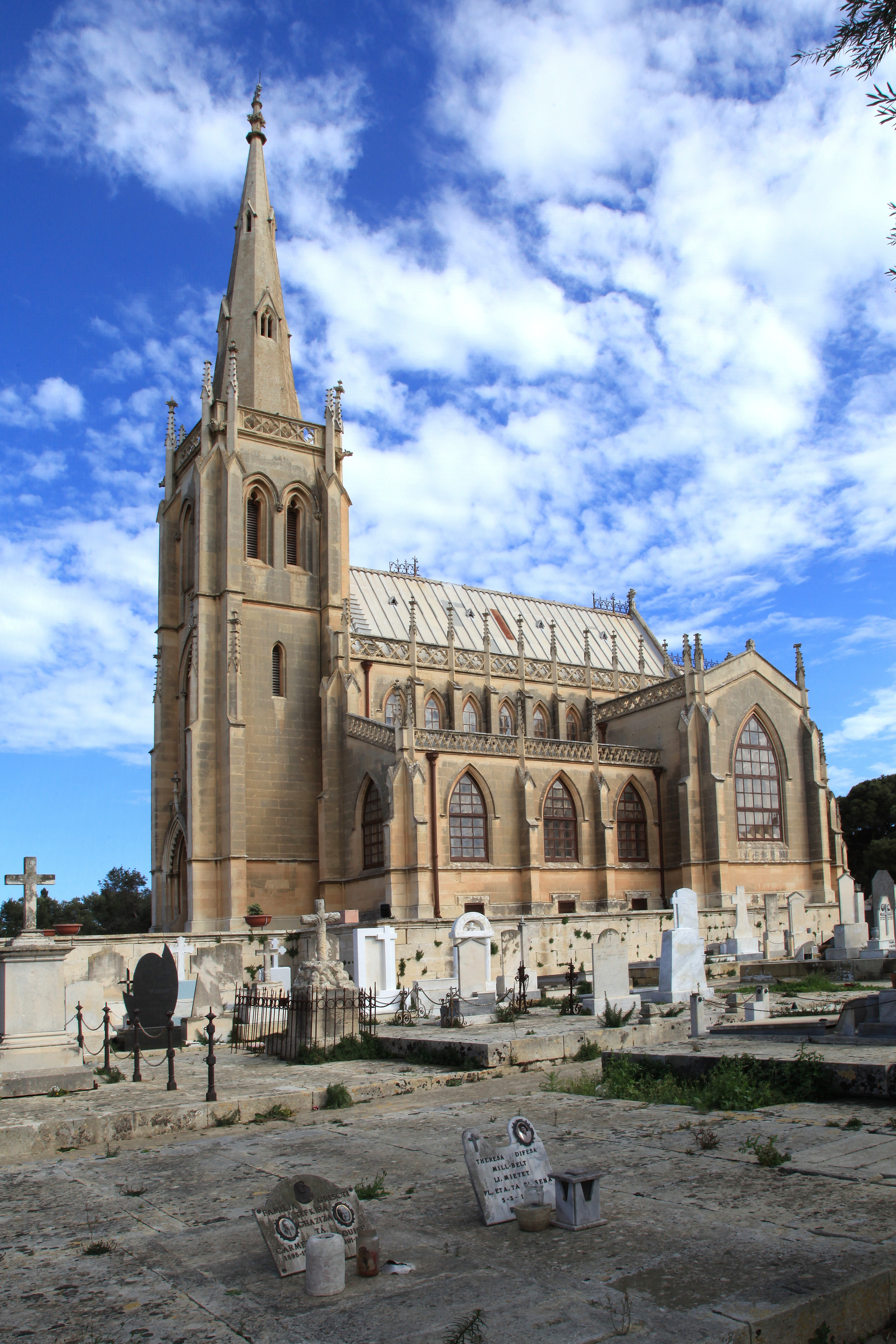
Our Lady of Sorrows church at the Addolorata Cemetery, Paola

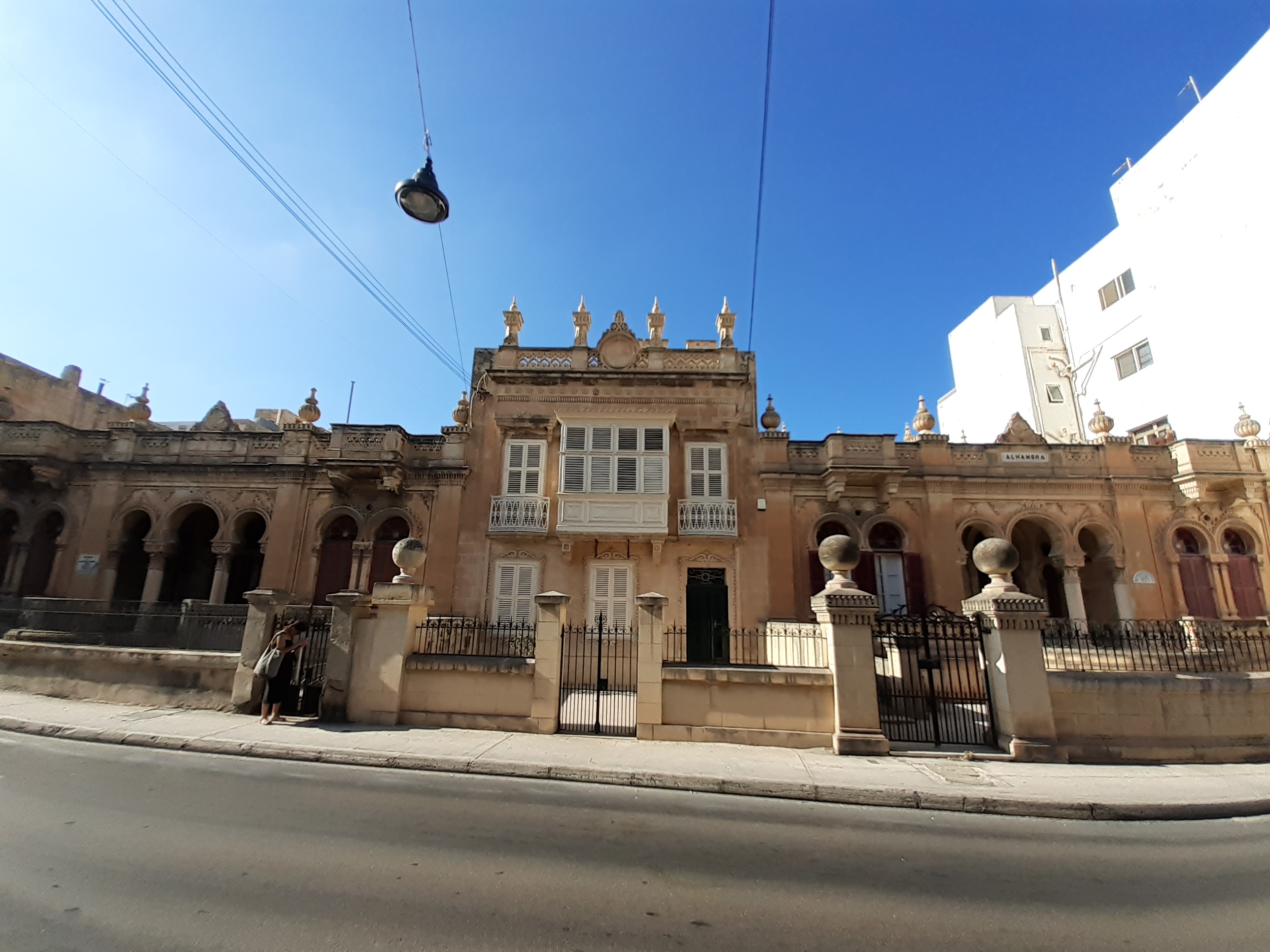
Villa Alhambra in Sliema

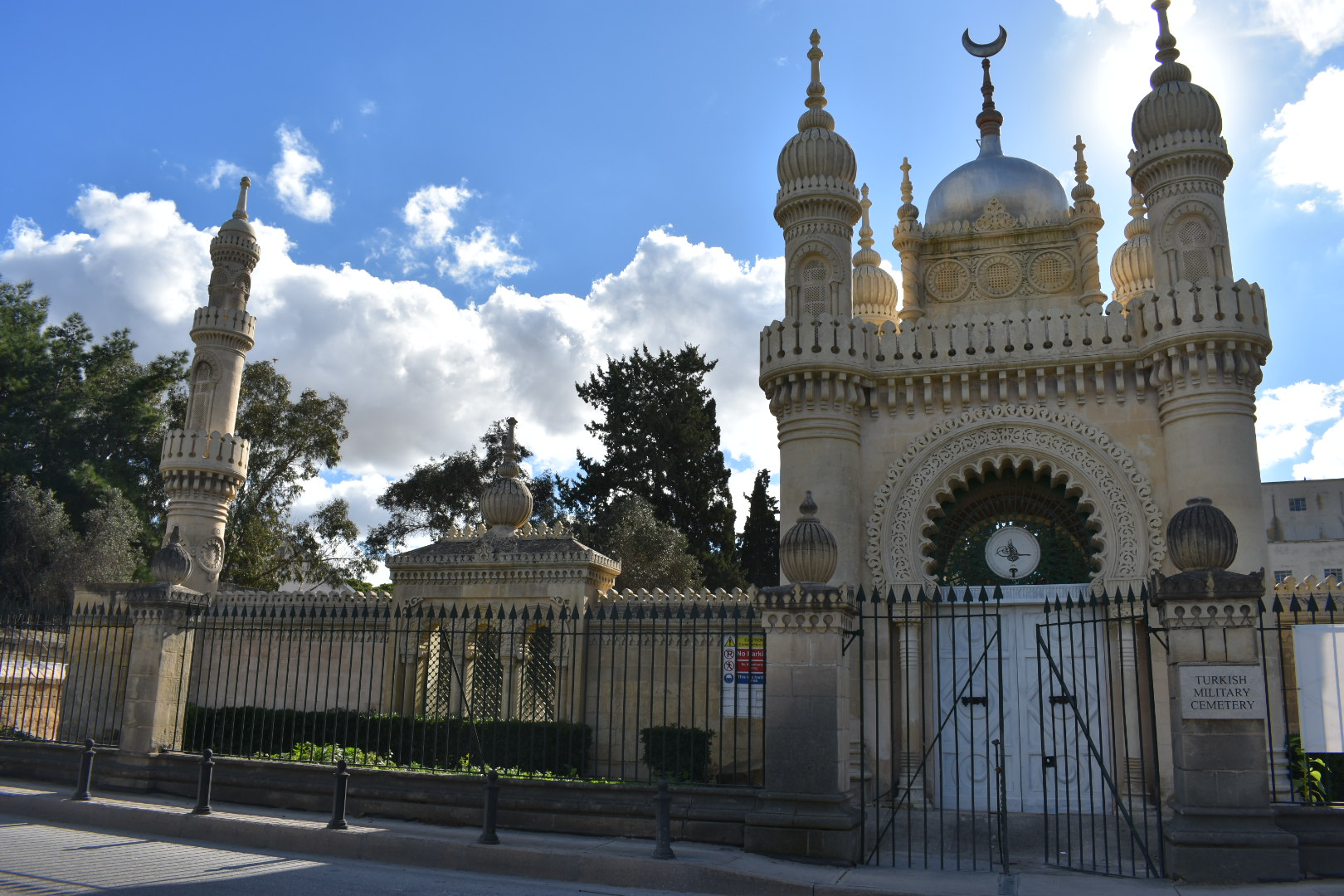
Turkish Military Cemetery in Marsa

== Biography ==
Galizia graduated as a civil engineer and architect from the University of Malta, and in 1846 entered government service as an apprentice of William Lamb Arrowsmith. He became a government perito in 1856 and, four years later, the chief perito, being responsible for all the government's public works. He became Superintendent of Public Works in 1880, which came with a seat on Malta's Legislative Council.

Galizia was made a knight of the Order of St. Gregory the Great by Pope Leo XIII, and he became a member of the Order of the Medjidie during Sultan Abdülaziz's visit to Malta in 1867 in recognition of Galizia's completion of the Turkish Military Cemetery in Marsa, which was commissioned by the Sultan.

In 1881, while Superintendent of Public Works, Galizia oversaw the excavations at the recently discovered Domvs Romana.

He became a member of the Institution of Civil Engineers in 1886, and a fellow of the Royal Institute of British Architects in 1888. That year, the government sent him on a tour of Italy, France and England to broaden his knowledge of Gothic Revival architecture, and possibly also to provide advice on Tower Bridge in London (completed in 1894), and the Victorian restoration works at the Brighton Pavilion.

Galizia was also an examiner at the faculty of civil engineering at the University of Malta.

He was also commissioned by the Imperial Government to visit Cyprus soon after the British occupation of the island and report upon its possible colonisation. The first visit was made in conjunction with Sir Adrian Dingli and Professor Schinas; subsequently, he travelled in the company of Marquis Testaferrata Olivier. The reports of the visits and surveys were printed and published under the authority of the Government at the time. An Institute of Civil Engineers obituary published in 1907 praised his "tact and affability [which] endeared him to the whole community, whilst the ability and thoroughness which he displayed in all his work gives him a permanent place in the record of professional achievement in Malta."

According to Derek Moss, Galizia

adopted an exotic and flamboyant arabesque style with horseshoe arches and carvings, which he applied to building three large terraced single-storey houses (Alcazar, Pax, Alhambra) in Rudolf Street on the main access into the heart of Sliema. These were the first scheduled houses in Sliema, surrounded by fields, which dominated the rural landscape, and were seen from afar. He also designed the Police Station at the Ferries landing place and St. Gregory's church. The Diana fountain erected in St Anne Square to commemorate the supply of fresh water to Sliema is also by Galizia's hand. Today, this stands in Balluta Square.

== Personal life ==
His eldest son, James Galizia, became Superintendent of Public Works, like his father before him, and then Treasury Secretary in Malta's imperial administration.

His second son Godwin Galizia, also an architect, was known for his neo-Romanesque architecture such as the Church of Saint Peter in Birzebbugia and the Church of Saint Gregory in Sliema, but his works until recently received less attention than those of his father. Godwin was also appointed by private families to design chapels and mausoleums at the Addolorata Cemetery, which was designed by his father. He also designed the second Britannia Circus in Floriana and two Art Nouveau villas in St. Paul's Bay, Villino Chapelle and Villa Preziosi.

Giovanna Galizia married the constitutional lawyer and civil law professor John Caruana, son of Maltese archaeologist A.A. Caruana. Their eldest son, Anton, a prominent lawyer killed in an air raid in Malta in World War II, took the surname Caruana Galizia, followed by his siblings.

== Buildings attributed to Galizia ==
The following is a list of notable buildings which are known to have been designed by Emanuele Luigi Galizia or are attributed to him:

- Ta' Braxia Cemetery, Pietà (1855)
- Addolorata Cemetery and chapel, Paola (1860)
- Prince of Wales Road (1862)
- Rinella polverista (1864)
- Armier Aqueduct between Qormi and the Three Cities (1867)
- Ta' Qali reservoir (1867)
- Some granaries at Floriana (1869)
- Second Carmelite Church, Balluta (1871)
- Turkish Military Cemetery, Marsa (1873–74)
- Bugeja Institute Technical School, Ħamrun (1880)
- Vincenzo Bugeja Institute
- Aqueduct of Sliema and Birkirkara (1882)
- Victoria Gate, Valletta (1884–85)
- Our Lady of Lourdes Church, Mġarr, Gozo (1888)
- St. Alphonse church and convent, Birkirkara (1893–95)
- Marsamxett Police Station, Valletta
- Marsa Police Station
- Sliema Police Station
- Marsaxlokk quay
- Marsamxett quay
- Villa Alhambra, Sliema (1880s), Moghul and Moorish exterior – Baroque and Victorian interior, designed by and summer residence of Galizia.
- Galizia family chapel at the Addolorata Cemetery, where he is buried.
- The Church of Our Lady of Sorrows, St Paul's Bay (1902)

The Valletta Market (1859–61) and St. Vincent de Paule Hospital (1886) were built under Galizia's direction, although they were designed by other architects.
