= Antonio Annetto Caruana =

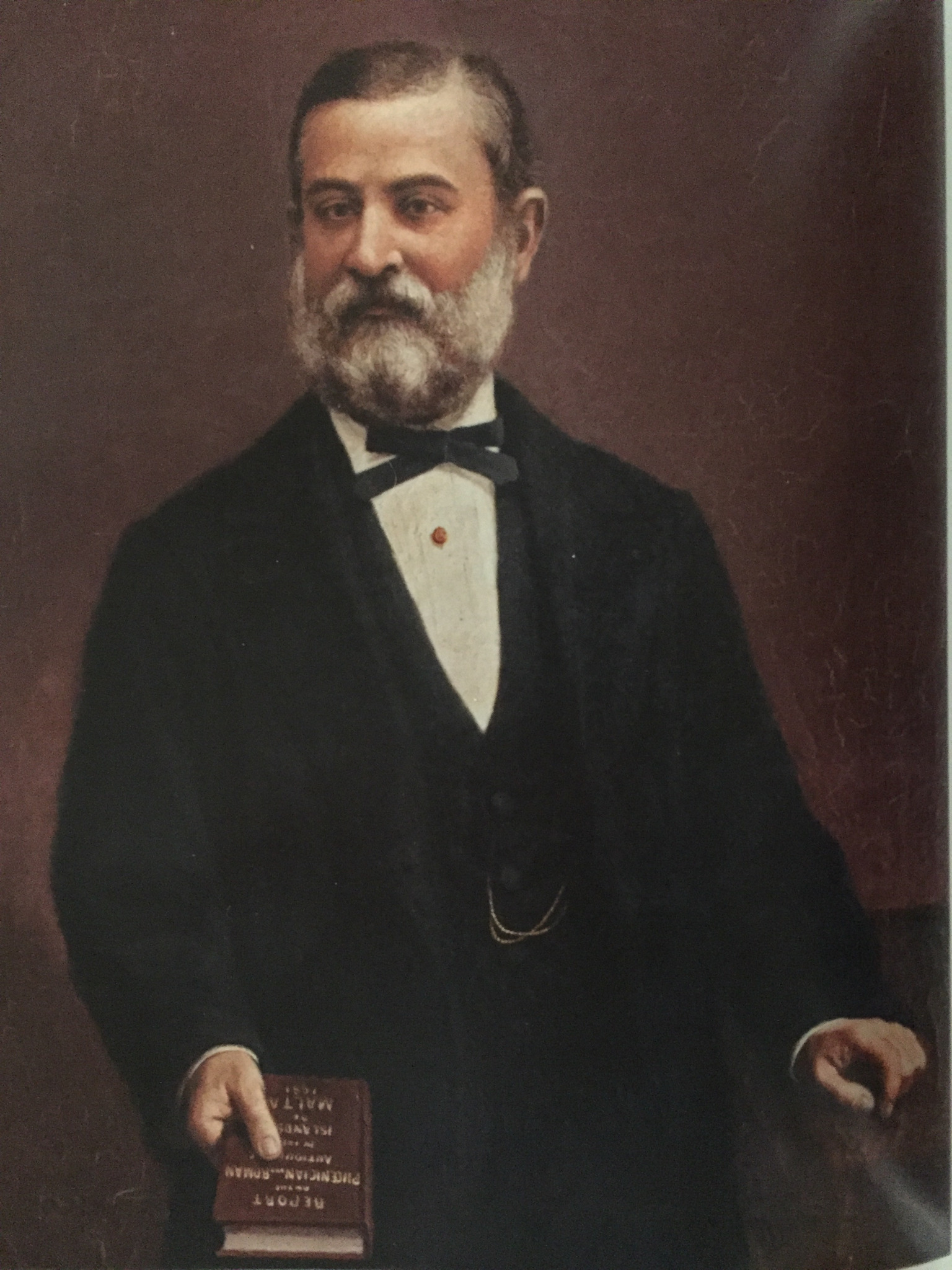
A.A. Caruana holding his Report on the Phoenician and Roman Antiquities in the group of islands of Malta (1888)

Antonio Annetto Caruana (14 May 1830 – 3 March 1905), also known as A. A. Caruana, was a Maltese archaeologist and author.

== Biography ==
Born in Valletta, Malta, Caruana showed an unusual proficiency in the knowledge of classical literature by his early adulthood. Graduating with a doctorate in Theology from the University of Malta, Caruana started a long career at the University of Malta which saw him secretary and rector of that institution for many years.

He was later appointed Librarian and Keeper of Antiquities at the National Library of Malta (1880–1896) and is credited with bringing about various changes within the institution. He was concurrently Director of Education in Malta's imperial administration (1887–1896).

Caruana is probably best known for his activities as an archaeologist, publishing numerous books and articles including his Report on the Phoenician and Roman Antiquities in the group of the islands of Malta, first published in 1882. He worked on the excavation of the Ħaġar Qim neolithic temple complex, and the Domvs Romana in Rabat, Malta. He made his first excavations of catacombs in 1860 with Capt. Strickland and, from 1871, was active for the next thirty years in exploring myriad tombs and catacombs across the Maltese islands, which were rarely easy to get to. He also worked on the cleaning and surveying of St. Paul's Catacombs in 1894.

Although many of his ideas have since been challenged, Caruana is considered to be a pioneer in the field of heritage management in the Maltese Islands.

== Personal life ==
Caruana declined being ordained a priest to marry Maria Metropoli, one of three daughters of Giuseppe Metropoli, notary to the Roman Curia in Malta, whose two other daughters married the 6th Count Preziosi and Salvatore dei Duchi Mattei. Their only son, John Caruana, was a 20th-century Maltese philosopher and constitutional lawyer and the son-in-law of the Victorian architect Emanuele Luigi Galizia. One of Caruana's direct descendants married the Maltese investigative journalist Daphne Caruana Galizia, who wrote a thesis on his life and work for her degree in archaeology at the University of Malta. Caruana lived at 266, St Paul's Street, Valletta.
