= Is-Suq tal-Belt =

19th-century market in Valletta, Malta

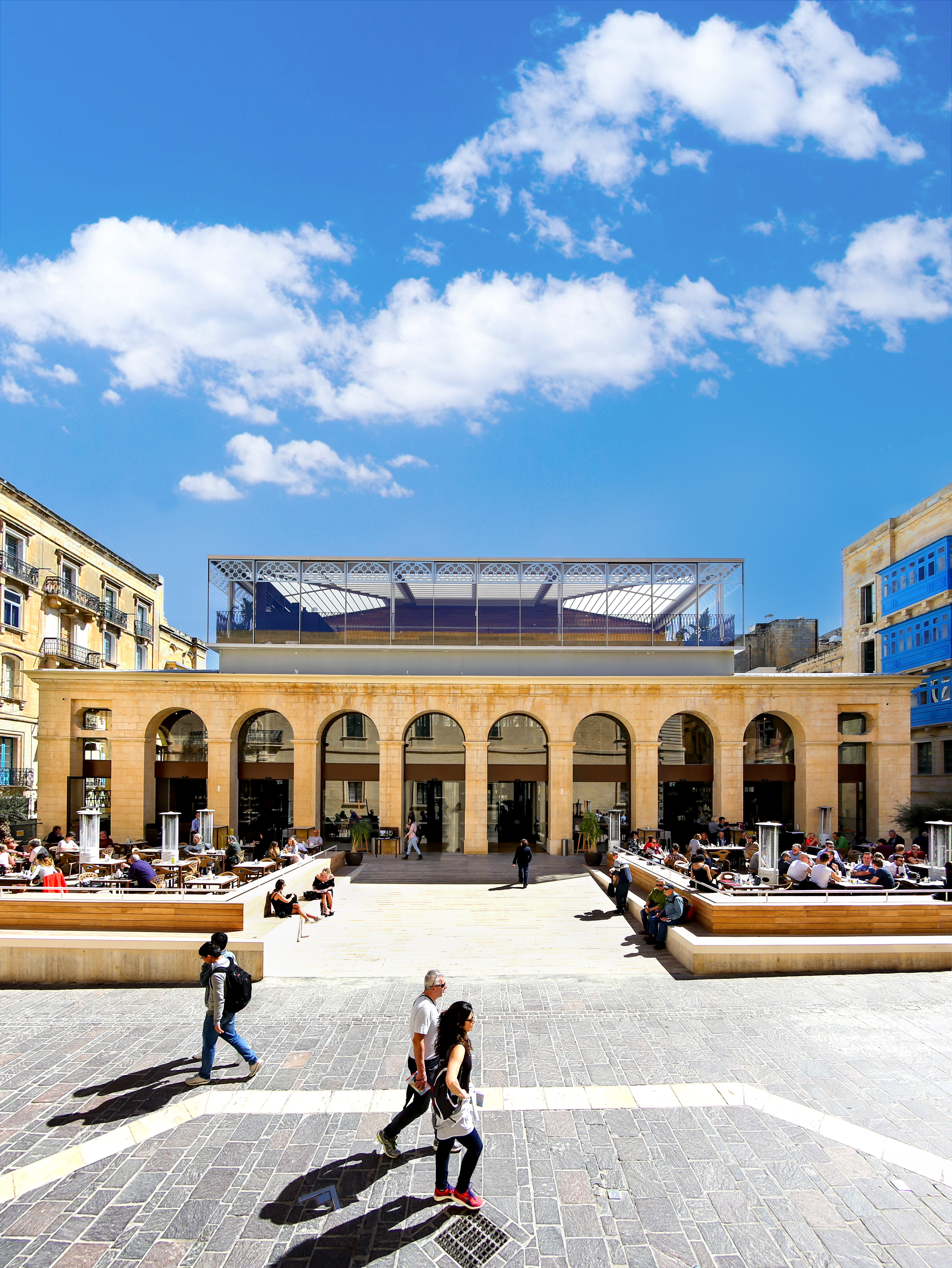
- The market, in 2024
- Interactive map of the Is-Suq tal-Belt area
- Alternative names: Valletta Market; Covered Market; Is-Suq l-Antik

General information
- Status: Renovated
- Type: Market hall
- Architectural style: Victorian
- Location: Valletta, Malta
- Coordinates: 35°53′52.5″N 14°30′51.9″E
- Current tenants: Arkadia Ltd
- Construction started: 1859
- Completed: 1861
- Renovated: 1940s (reconstruction); 1970; 2016–17
- Cost: £3934

Technical details
- Material: Cast iron, wrought iron and limestone
- Floor count: 3

Design and construction
- Architect: Hector Zimelli

Website
- www.issuqtalbelt.com

Is-Suq tal-Belt (IPA: [ɪˈsːuːʔ tɐl ˈbɛlt]; Maltese for 'City Market' or 'Valletta Market'), also known as the Covered Market, is a 19th-century market hall located in Valletta, Malta. It is notable for being the first building in Malta to be constructed mostly of iron. The building was severely damaged in World War II, and the rebuilding was insensitive to the original structure. Further alterations were made in later decades, and the market began to decline in the 1970s. An attempt to rebrand it as a shopping arcade known as Ixtri Malti (Buy Maltese) in the 1980s was unsuccessful. The market continued to decline until it was renovated in 2016–17, and reopened as a food market in January 2018.

== History ==
=== Background and construction ===
The Piazza del Malcantone around 1600.

In the 16th century, the site now occupied by the market was a square named Piazza del Malcantone. The site was used as part of the gallows parade of a guilty person, which was humiliated and tortured around Valletta, before being hanged in Floriana. It was also used as a marketplace, where crops and goods from the countryside were sold. At some point during the rule of the Order of St. John, the first market was built on site. It was a two-story-high Baroque building with a large central courtyard having a fountain. Arcades ran around three sides of the courtyard, with shops being spread over the two floors. In 1784, the building had two entrances, one leading to present-day Merchants Street and the other to St. Paul's Street. This building was demolished during the early British period, mainly due to sanitation problems. During the 2016–17 renovation, remains such as small rock-hewn cisterns and dividing walls from the original building were discovered, allowing archaeologists to make a 3D reconstruction of it.

There was a proposal to build a protestant church on site but was soon afterwards refused.

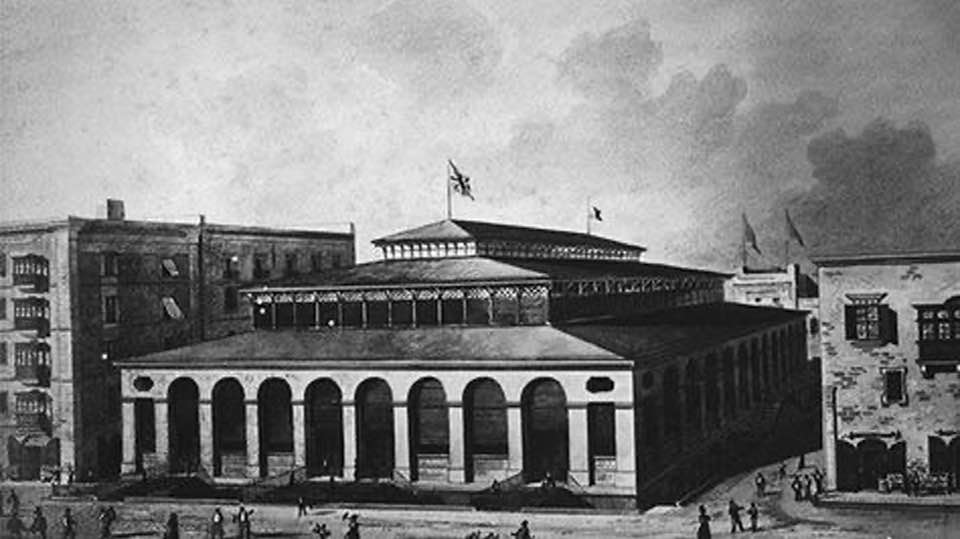
Is-Suq tal-Belt Valletta

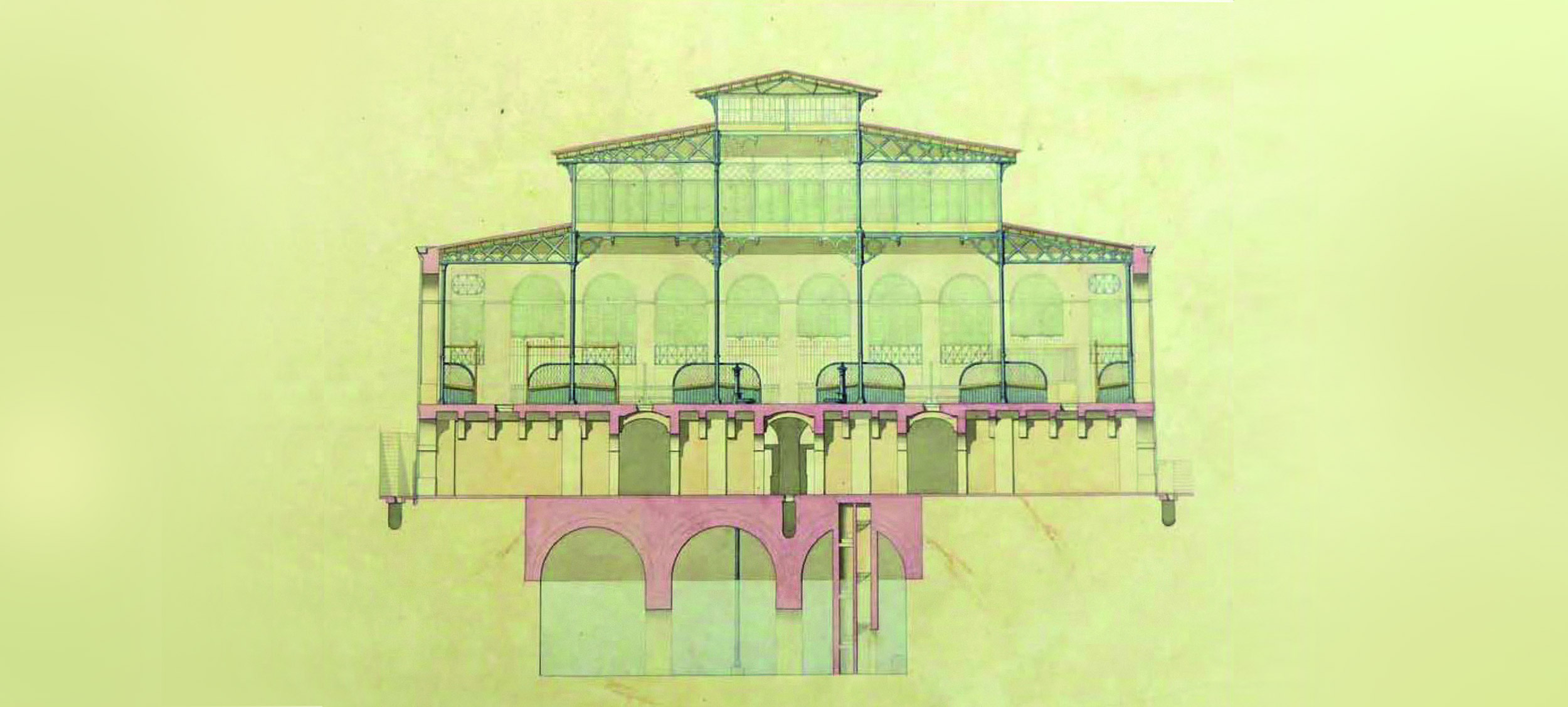
Cross-section

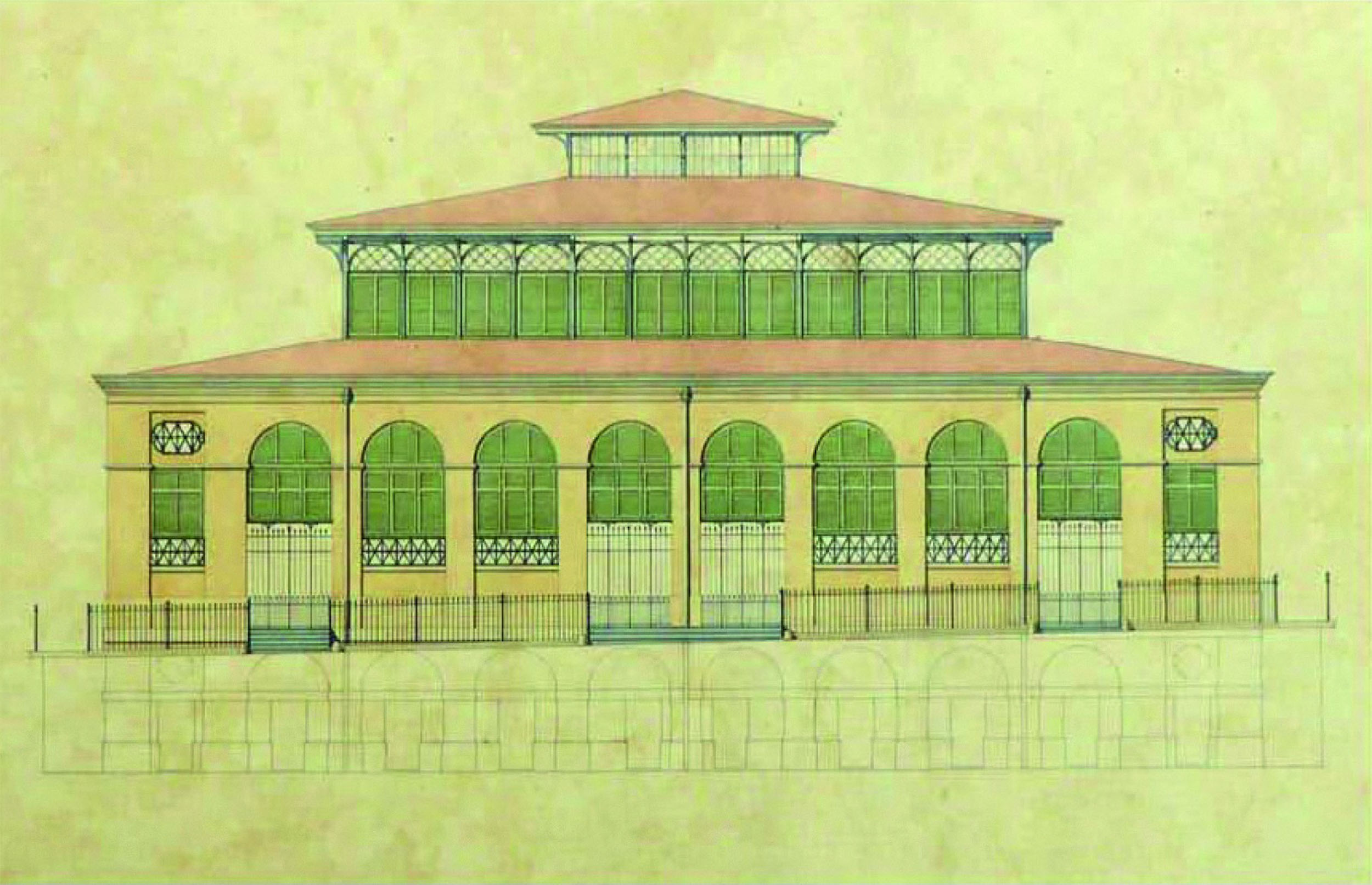
Elevation

Plans to reconstruct a covered market in Valletta began in 1845, and the Valletta Market was built between 1859 and 1861 on the site of the old prisons. The building was designed by the Superintendent of Public Works, Hector Zimelli, but was completed under the direction of Emanuele Luigi Galizia. Construction cost £3934, and the market originally contained 153 stalls and 65 cellars.

In 1938, the market was promoted by one of the fruit vendors at having the best supplies of fresh food for every strata of society.

== Architecture ==
Is-Suq tal-Belt has a rectangular plan, and the walls and arches making up its three floors are built of limestone like many other buildings in Malta. However, the roof is made of cast and wrought iron decked in timber, and it is supported on cast iron columns and trusses. This use of iron makes it an unusual structure, and it was the first building in Malta to be constructed mostly of pre-fabricated iron. Iron had been used in earlier structures on the island, such as the Naval Bakery and the Corradino Prisons, but on a much smaller scale than the Valletta Market.

The design of the Valletta Market was inspired by Covent Garden (London) and Halles Centrales (Paris). The design of the Valletta Market influenced similar projects elsewhere in the British Empire, including in Calcutta.

=== World War II and decline ===
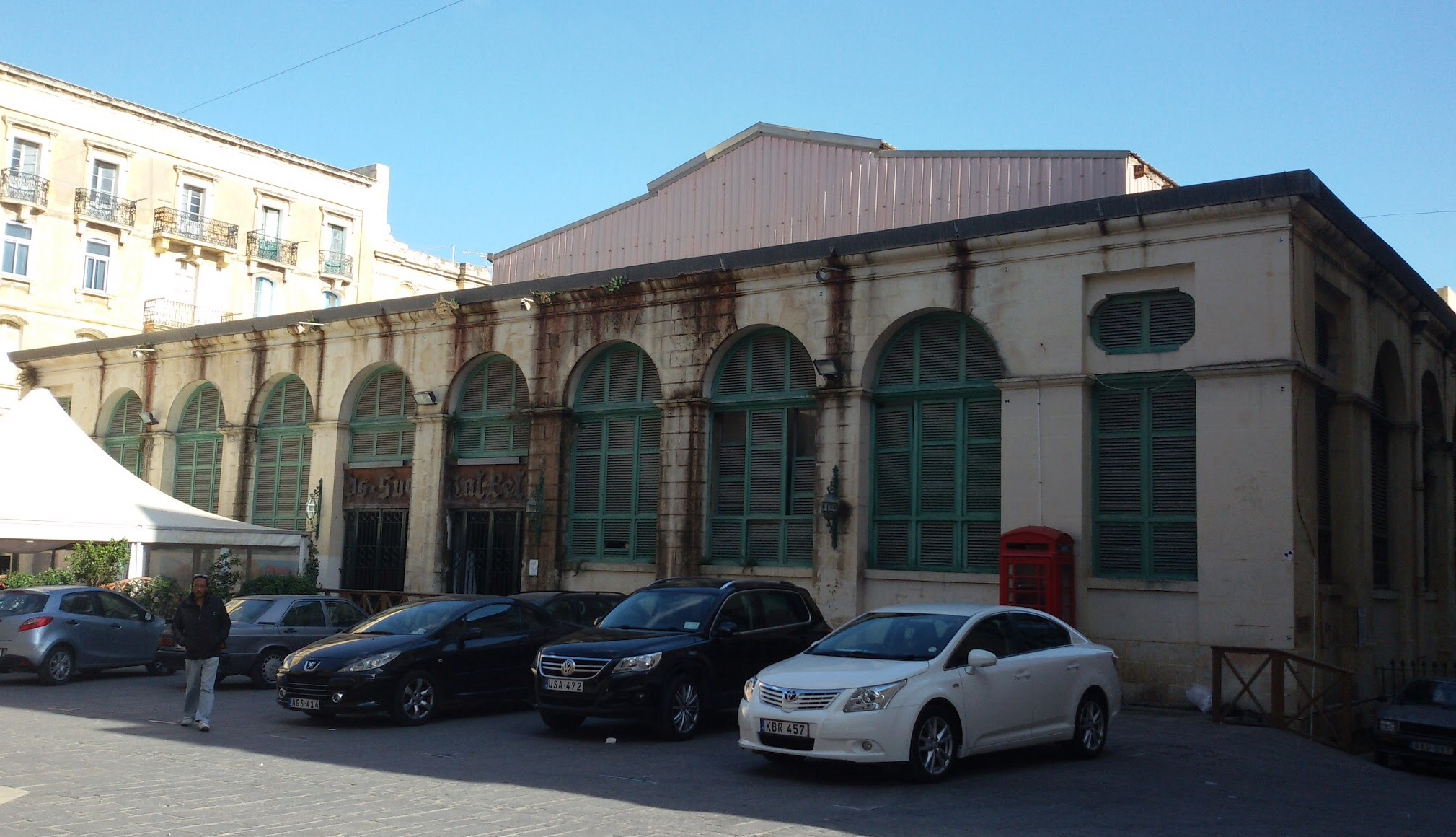
The market hall in 2016, just before renovation

The building was bombed on 7 April 1942, during World War II, destroying one third of the building. The damaged parts were repaired soon afterwards, but were not rebuilt to the original plan and the roof's symmetry was lost. By 1966, the market no longer met hygiene standards so it was overhauled. In 1970, two new floors were built and a pair of escalators were installed. The market thrived for a few more years, before it began to decline in the mid-1970s.

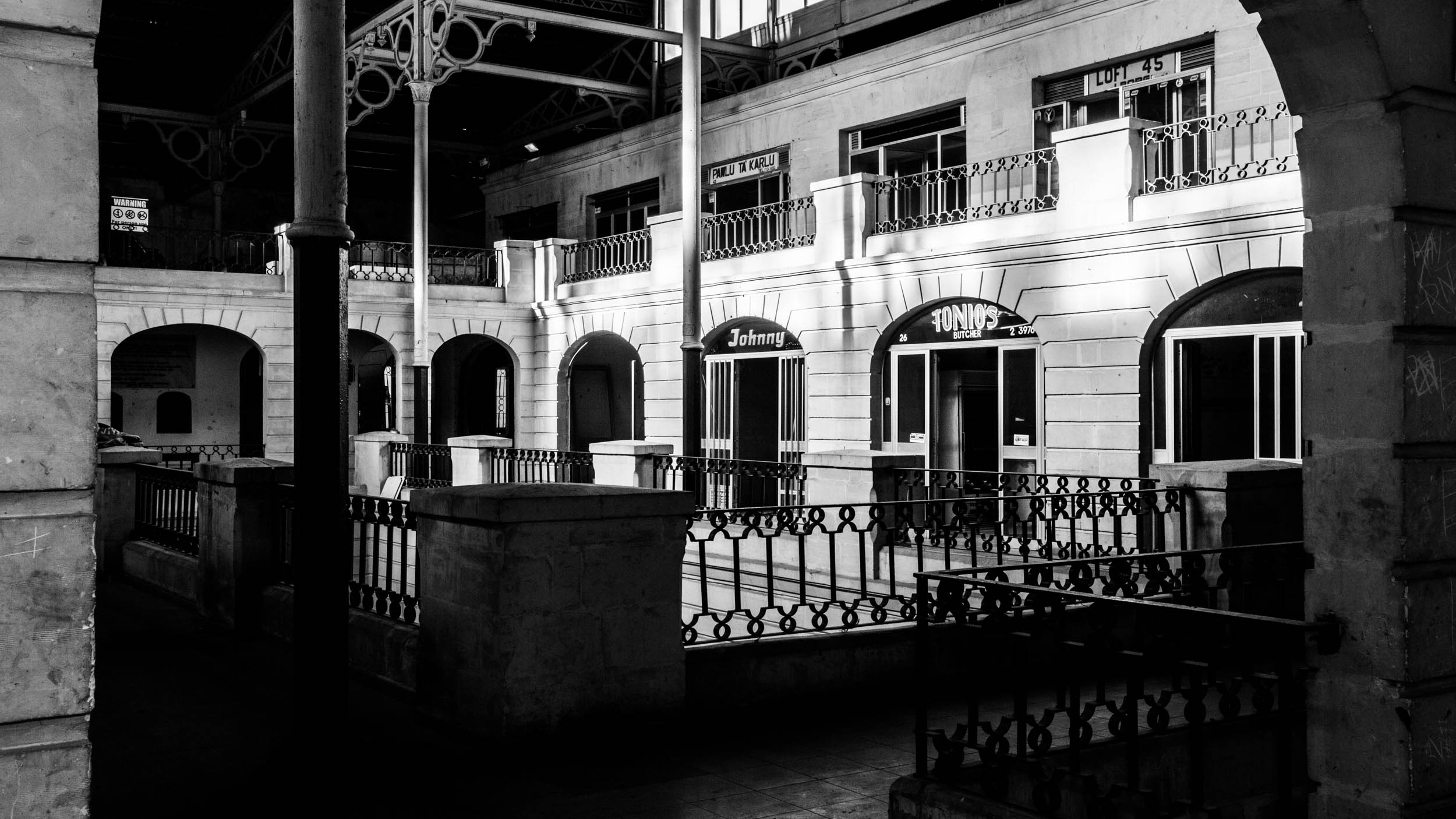
Interior pre-restoration works, 2016

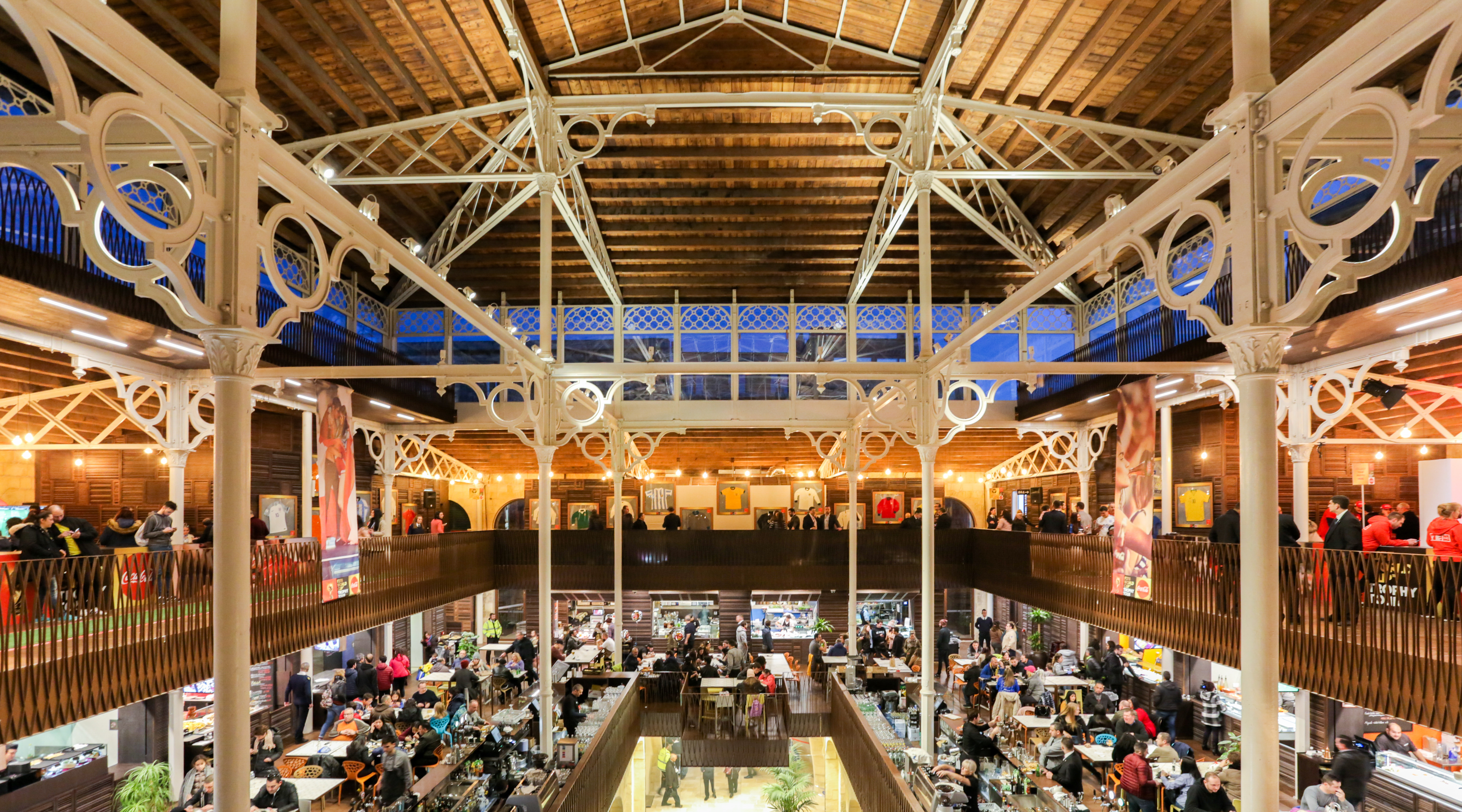
Interior overview at night

In 1982, the food market was transferred to Floriana, and a year later the Valletta Market was re-branded as a shopping arcade called Ixtri Malti (Buy Maltese). This move was highly unsuccessful, and the food market moved back to Valletta in 1989. Despite this, the market continued to decline.

The Malta Environment and Planning Authority scheduled the building as a Grade 1 national monument on 28 March 2012.

=== Restoration ===
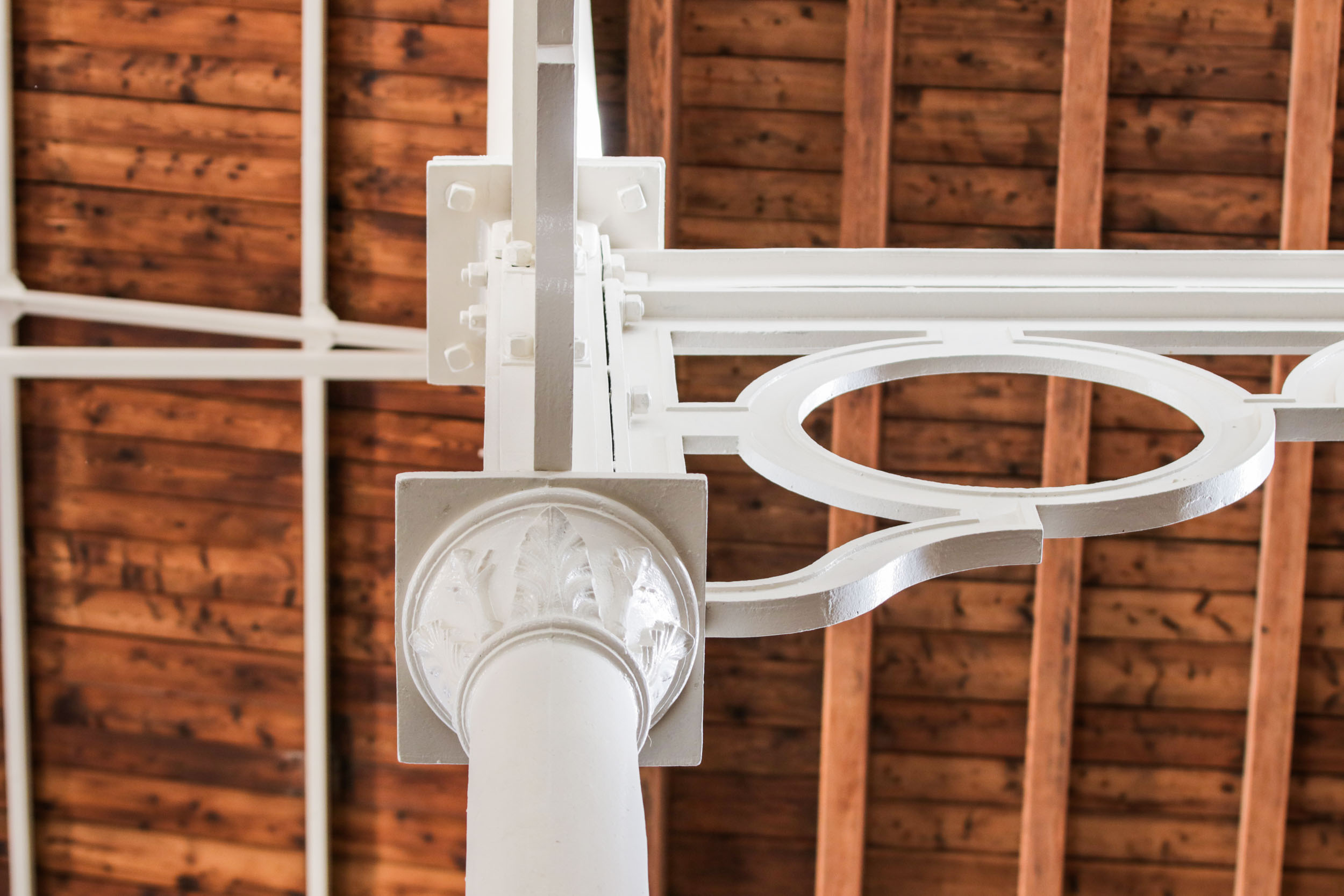
The Victorian structure restored

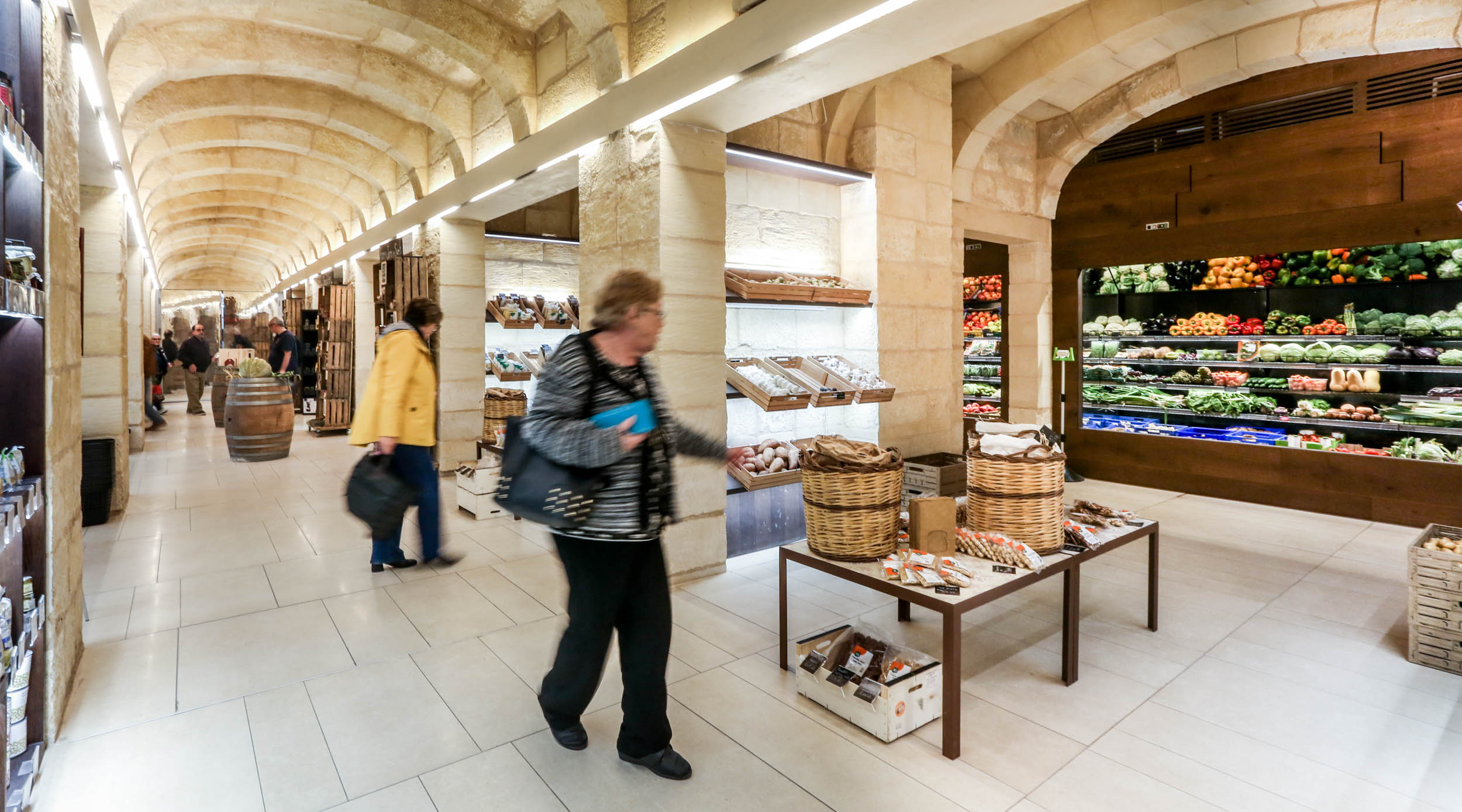
Level -1 - The Food Market

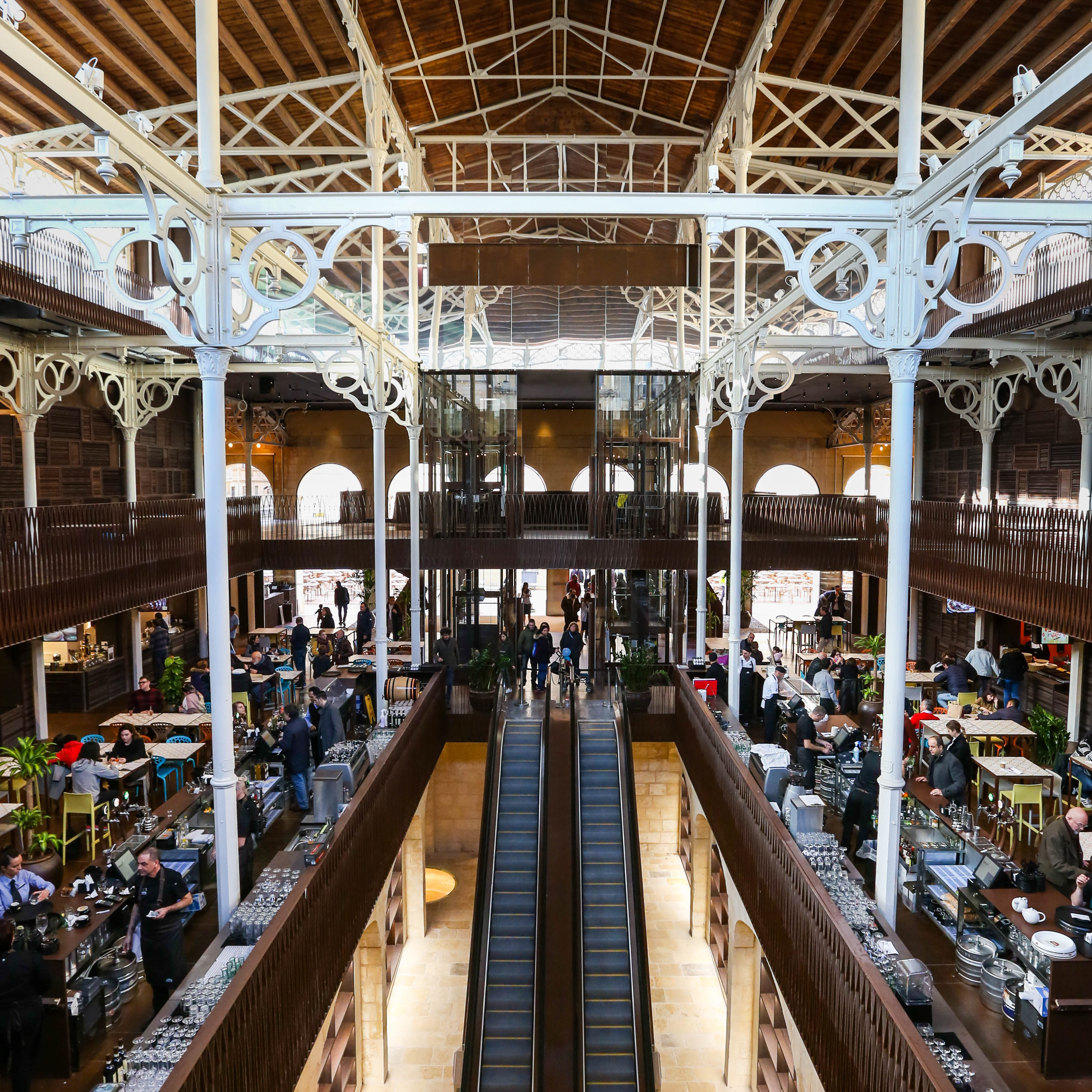
Interior

Plans for the restoration of the Valletta Market began following Valletta's nomination for European Capital of Culture 2018. The government deemed restoration of the structure as part of the Valletta regeneration master plan. In January 2016, the building was leased to the supermarket chain Arkadia Co. Ltd for 65 years. The restoration and renovation was originally estimated to cost around €7 million, but the overall investment eventually amounted to €14 million.

During the renovation, later additions to the building were dismantled, while the original elements of the structure were preserved and restored. Parts of the building were converted into food markets, restaurants and stalls, while the upper level is intended for cultural activities and events. The renovation works were inspired by the Market of San Miguel in Madrid and La Boqueria in Barcelona.

The renovation of the Valletta Market began in May 2016 and the project was expected to be complete by May 2017. An unofficial deadline of October was later repeatedly extended to mid-December, but these deadlines were missed. Works were almost complete by mid-2017, but continued until the end of the year, just in time for Valletta 2018. The market hall reopened to the public on 3 January 2018, and the official opening by Prime Minister Joseph Muscat took place on 2 March 2018.

Criticism for the redevelopment included concern from residents that the establishment would result in increased noise at night, especially if more restaurants and bars are established in the area.
