= Church of St Alphonse Liguori, Birkirkara =

Church of St Alphonse Liguori
- Il-Knisja ta' San Alfons Liguori
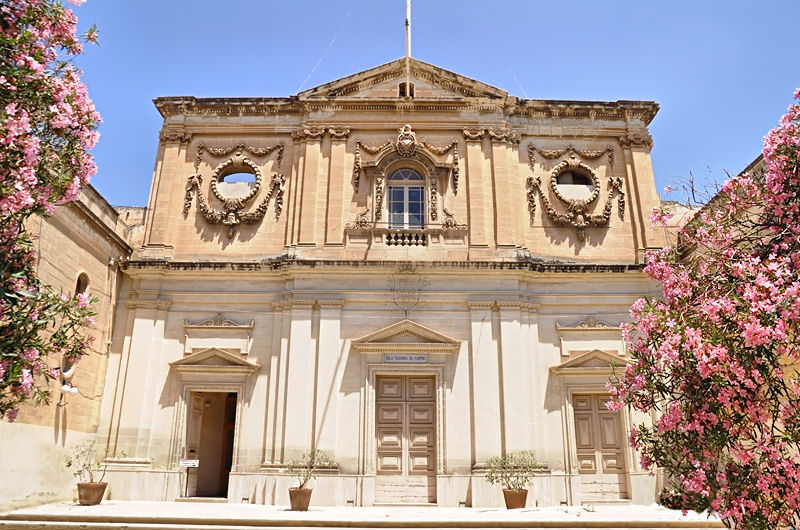
- Façade of the Church of St. Alphonse Liguori
- Church of St Alphonse Liguori
- 35°53′49.5″N 14°27′30.2″E
- Location: Birkirkara
- Country: Malta
- Denomination: Roman Catholic

History
- Status: Church
- Dedication: Alphonsus Maria de' Liguori

Architecture
- Functional status: Used as a meeting hall
- Architect: Emanuele Luigi Galizia
- Years built: 1893–1895

Specifications
- Materials: Limestone

The Church of St Alphonse Liguori (Maltese: Il-Knisja ta' San Alfons Liguori) is a Roman Catholic church in Birkirkara, Malta. It was operated by the Discalced Carmelites, and was dedicated to Saint Alphonsus Maria de' Liguori. The church is currently used as a meeting hall known as Our Lady of Mount Carmel Hall (Maltese: Sala Madonna tal-Karmnu).

== History ==
The church and the nearby convent were built between 1893 and 1895 to designs of the architect Emanuele Luigi Galizia. They were sponsored by Alphonse Maria Micallef, and was dedicated to Saint Alphonsus Maria de' Liguori in his honour. It was the second monastery opened in Malta by the Discalced Carmelites; their first was opened in Cospicua in 1625.

The first public function was held at the new premises by the friars on Saturday, 14 November 1896, with the chanting of the Salve Regina. Mass was first celebrated the next day, on November 15, by Fr Carmel of the Child Jesus, the first Vicar Provincial of the Semi-Province, who then proceeded to bless the new premises. An adjacent grotto, depicting the events of Our Lady of Lourdes, was sponsored by the Marquise Anna Bugeja, with statues of the Holy Virgin and Bernadette ordered from Paris. An ever growing population in the area and surrounding villages led to the church being enlarged twice, in 1904 and in 1909.

The church suffered extensive damage during a storm in 1959. The bell tower of the church, struck by lightning during the same storm, was eventually removed.

A growing number of attendees to the church services eventually led to the building of a new church dedicated to Saint Thérèse of Lisieux adjacent to the Church of St. Alphonse. The new church is a large, modernist rotunda of reinforced concrete and a corrugated roof, built to designs of the architect Giorgio Pacini. Construction of the modern church began in 1965 and was completed in 1982.

The Church of St. Alphonse is currently used as a meeting hall, and the building is listed on the National Inventory of the Cultural Property of the Maltese Islands.

== Architecture ==
The church has an ornate façade divided into three bays, with Doric and Ionic columns. It also had a belfry but this has been demolished.
