= Villa Alhambra =

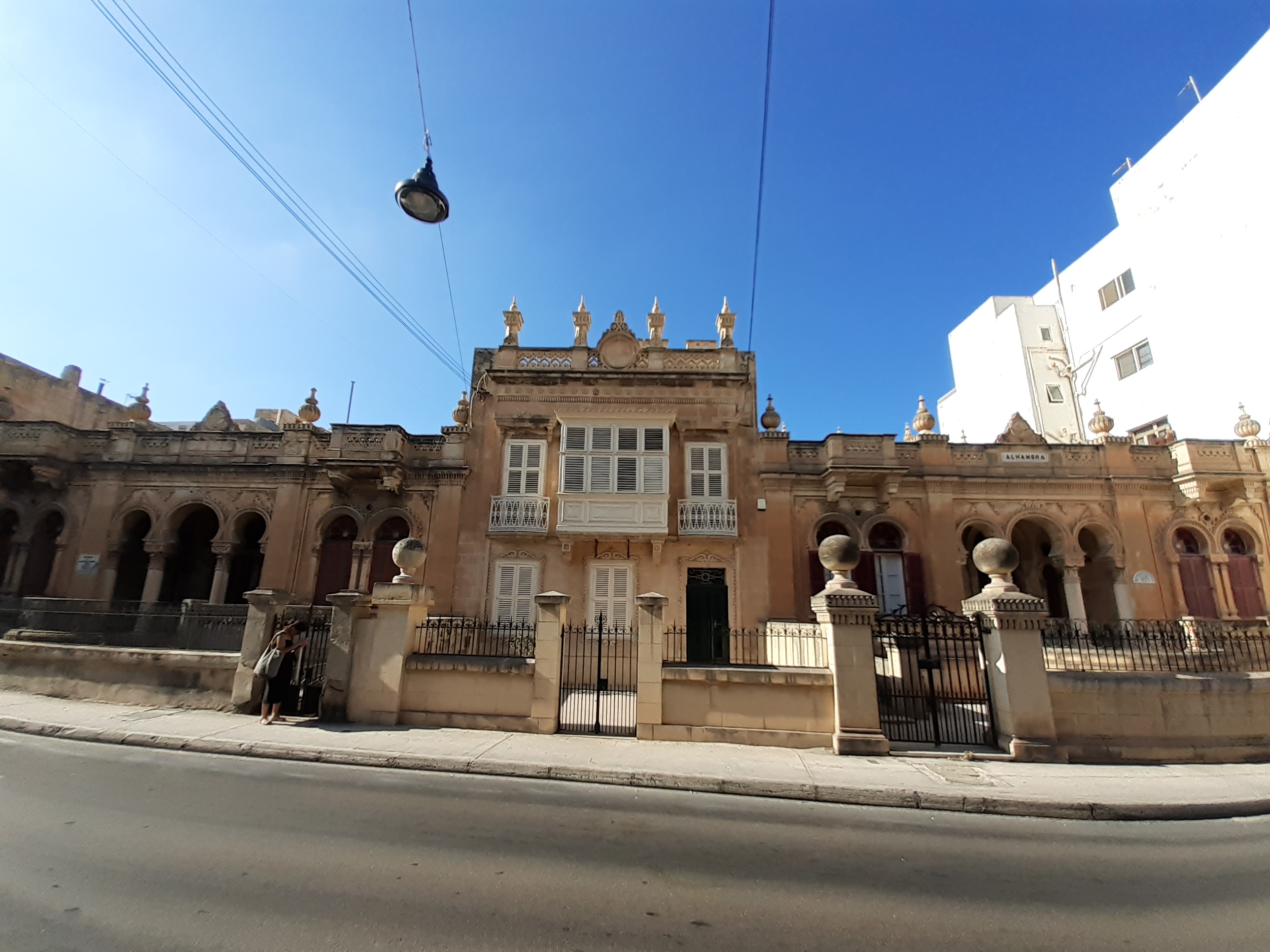
- Interactive map of the Villa Alhambra area

General information
- Status: Intact
- Type: House
- Architectural style: Moorish Revival
- Location: Sliema, Malta, Rudolph Street

Design and construction
- Architect: Emanuele Luigi Galizia

Villa Alhambra is a Moorish Revival villa in Sliema, Malta. Neighbouring both Villa Pax and Villa Alcazar, Villa Alhambra was built in the 1880s by prominent Maltese architect Emanuele Luigi Galizia as his own summer residence in Moorish Revival style. It has a Moghul and Moorish exterior, coupled with Baroque and Victorian interior.

== Ownership changes and redevelopment ==
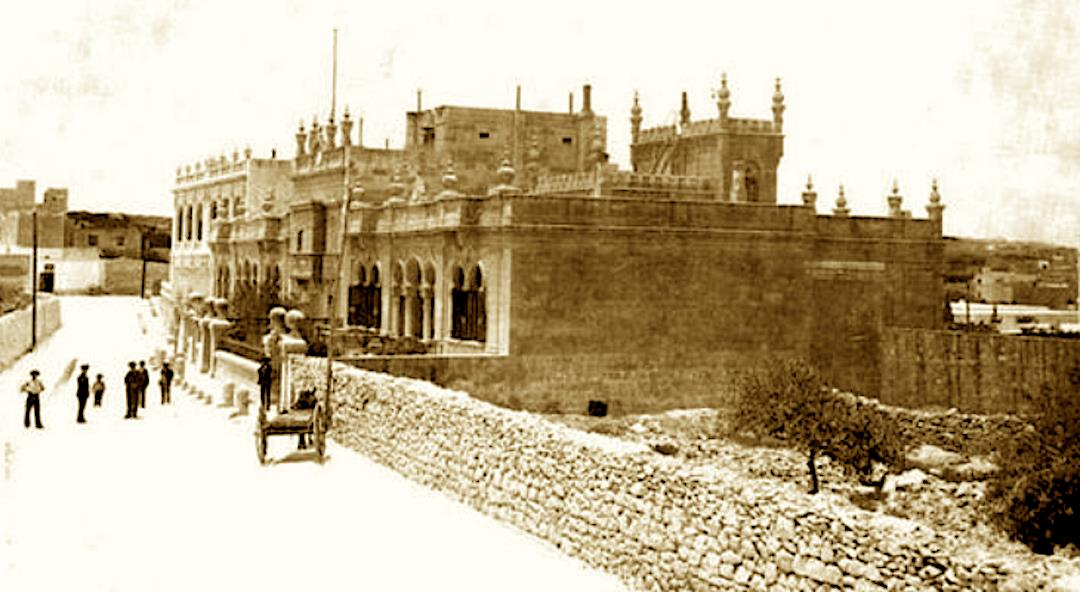
Villa Alhambra circa 1900

Long-time co-owned by Galizia heirs, it was over time sold, first partially and then in full, to the Tumas Group once Malta's Planning Authority listed it as Grade 1. It was then sold to Polidano Group, and the Planning Authority placed a Preservation Order on the property to prevent it from further degradation, requiring the owners to restore the house and gardens within two years. This went unheeded

In the early 2000s, developer Oliver Ruggier aimed at adding a large car park and a pool. The Planning Authority rejected the application in 2004 and settled for a preliminary permit for Oliver Ruggier in 2005, despite the protection afforded to the building.

In 2010 the new owner, Maltese construction magnate Nazzareno Vassallo, applied again to build an underground parking, envisaging the villas as a wedding venue and conference setting for 50-150 guests. This was rejected by the MEPA's Cultural Heritage Advisory Committee. The project was since downscaled and accepted, including a two-floor elevations on the back of the building for strictly residential purposes. As of 2019, works have not started.

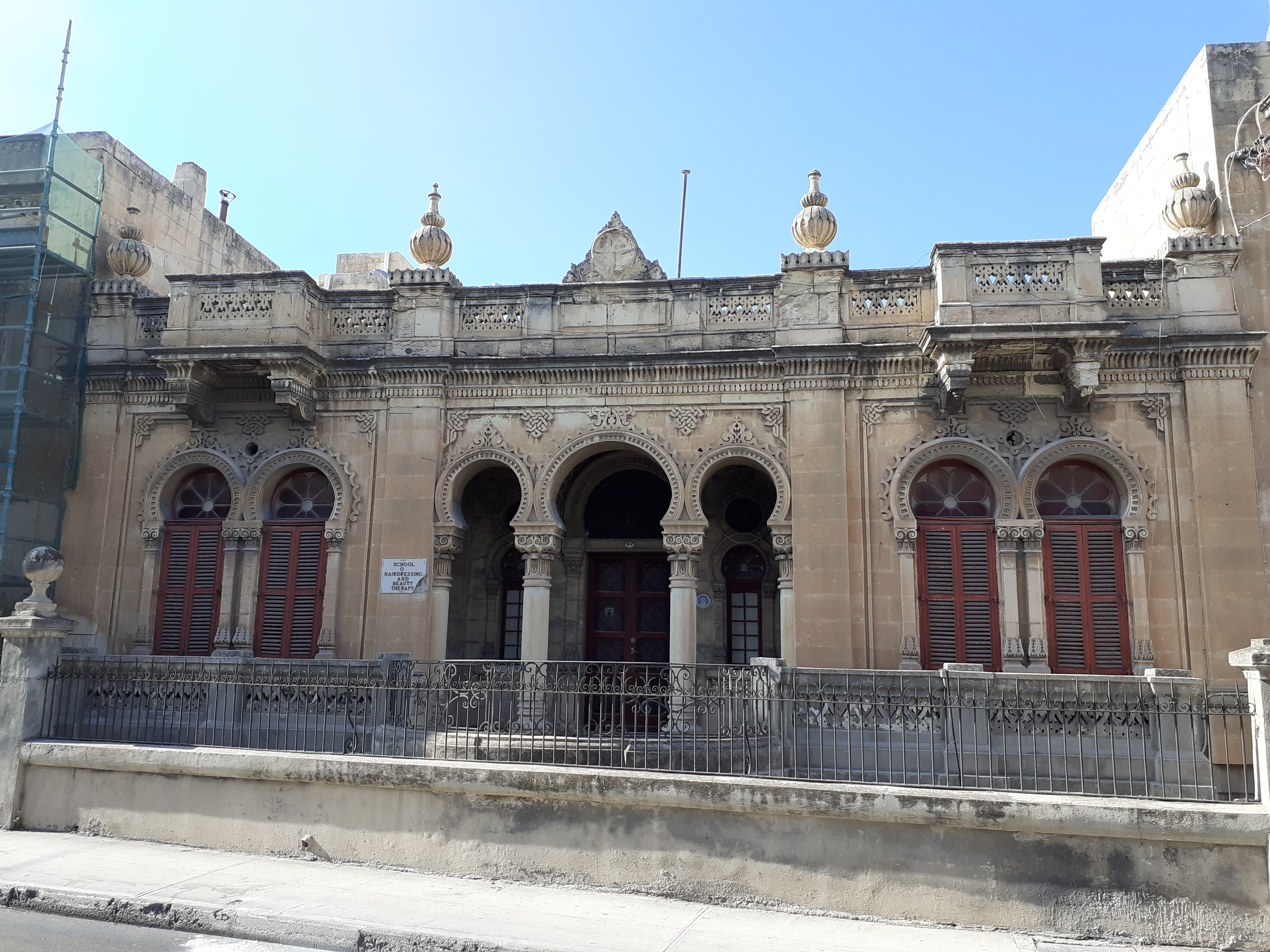

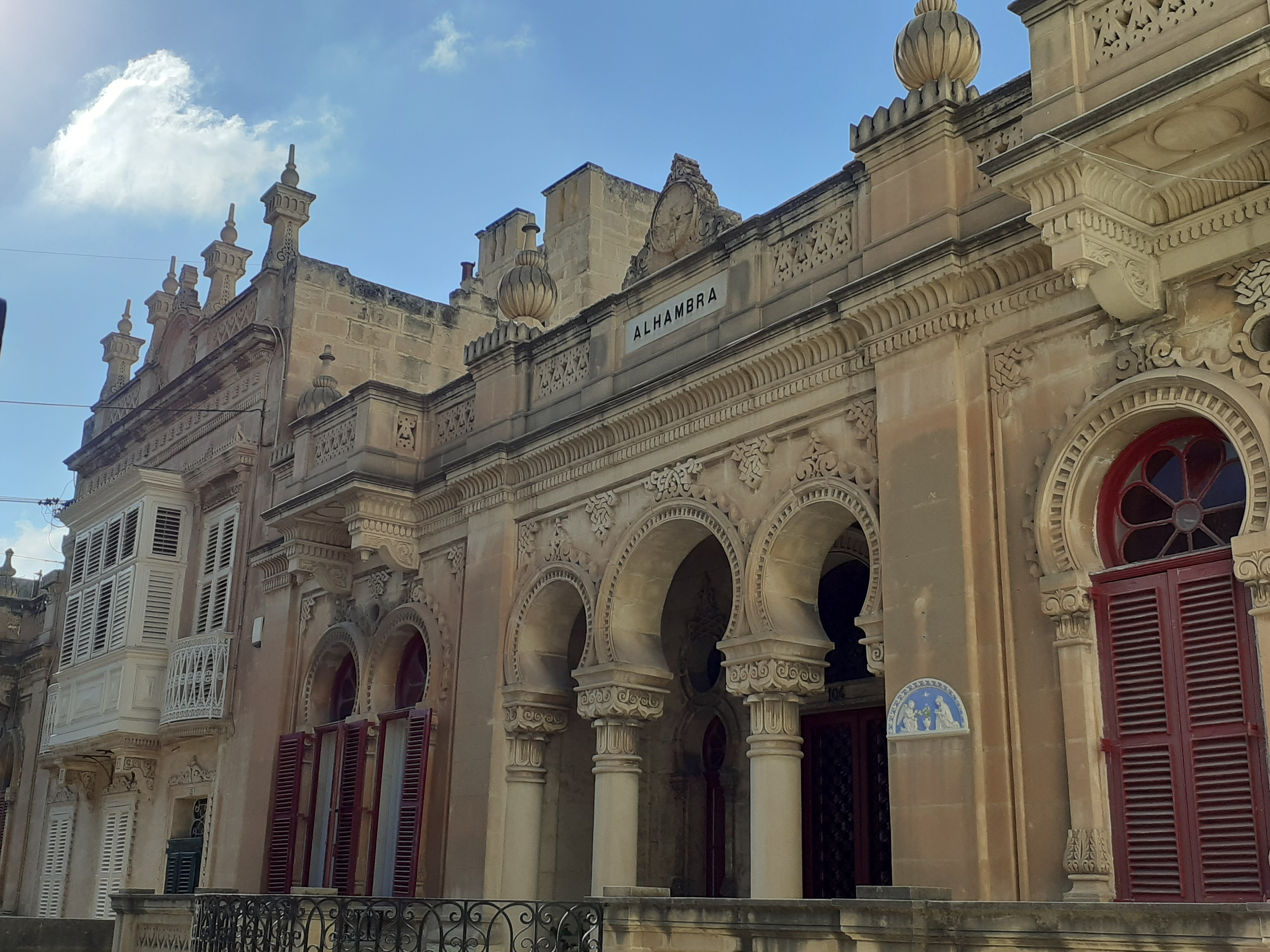

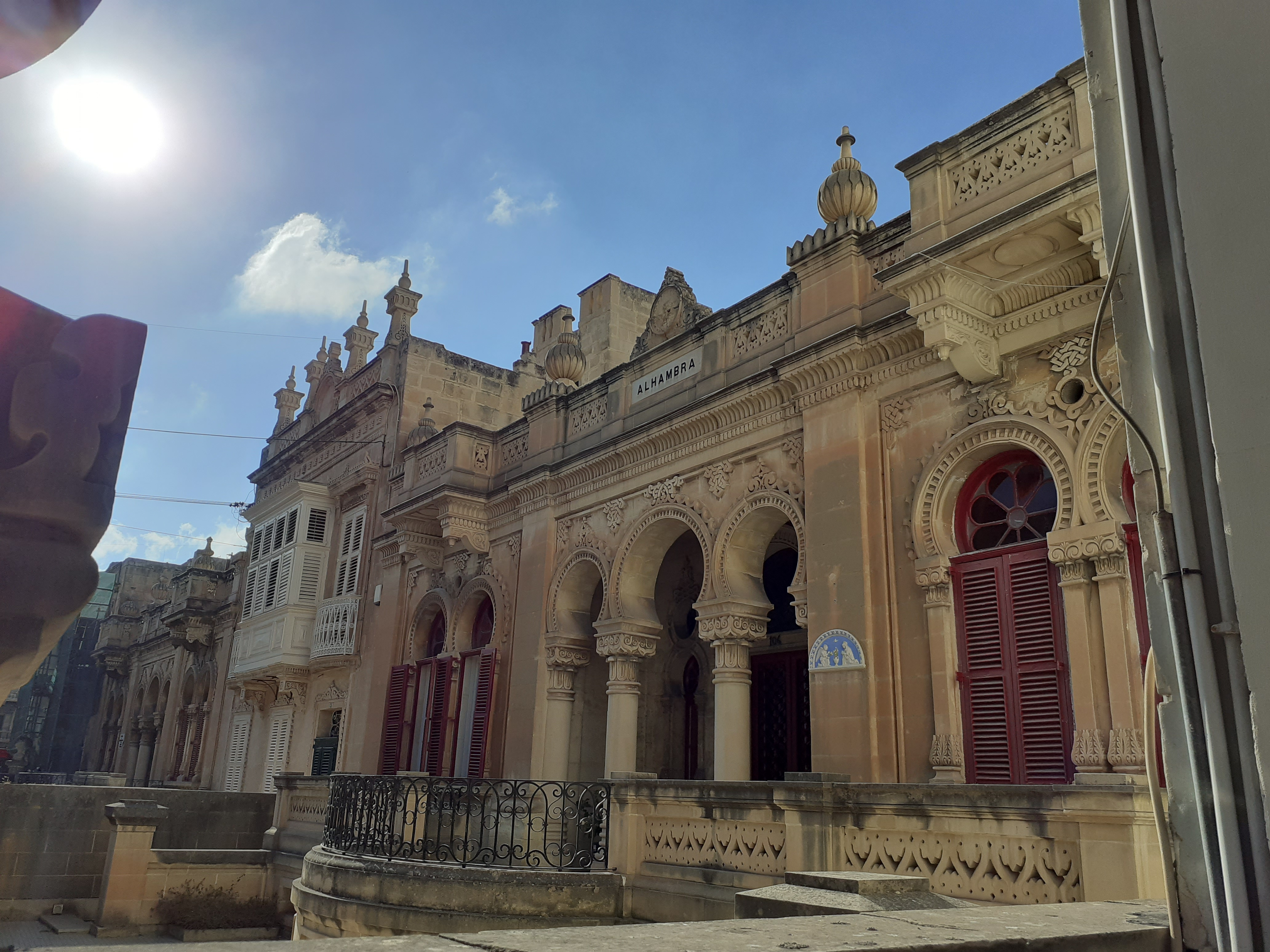

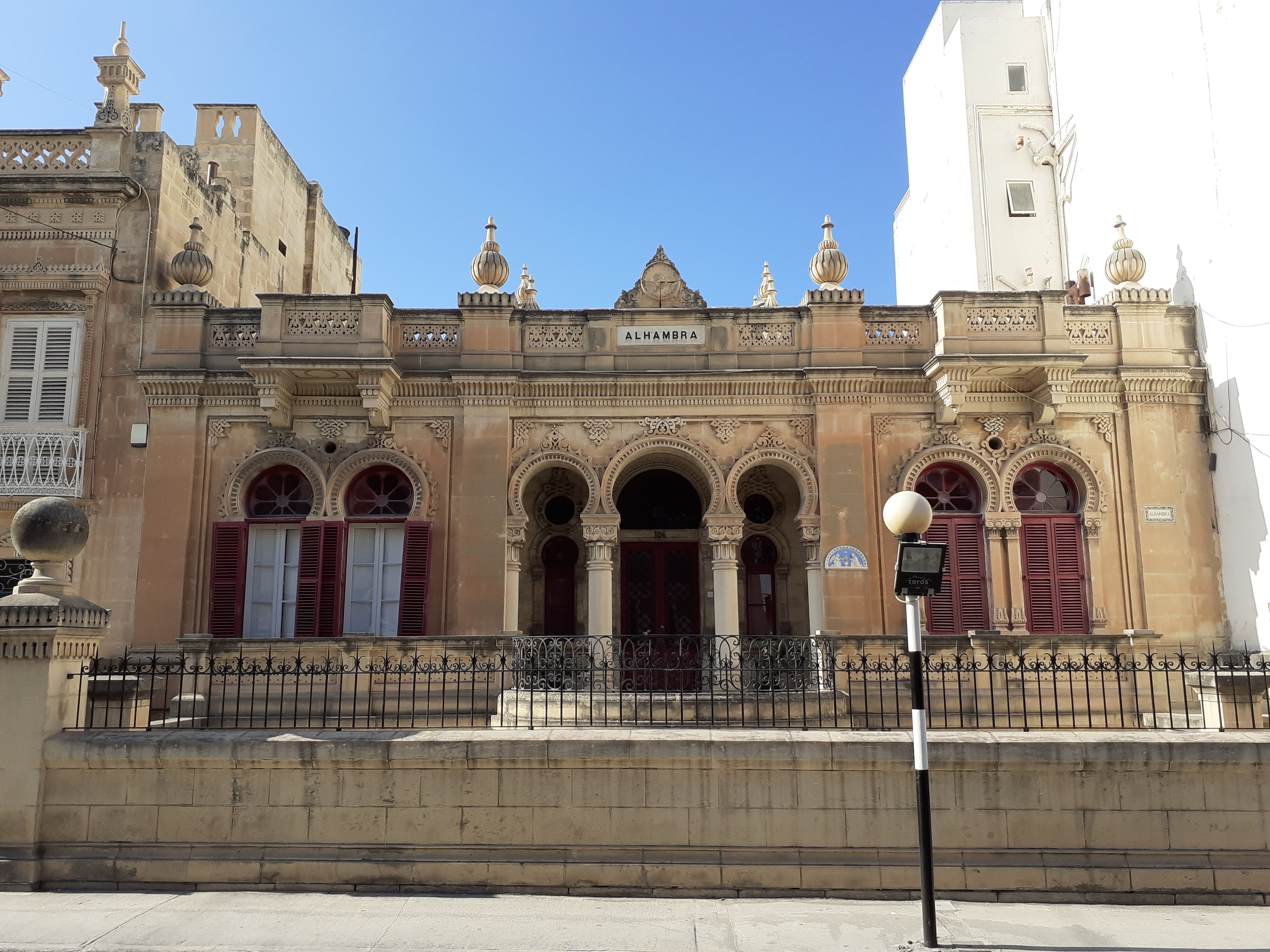
