= SS Sardinia =

SS Sardinia may refer to:

- SS Sardinia (1888)
- SS Sardinia (1902)
