= SS Sardinia (1902) =

Cargo liner

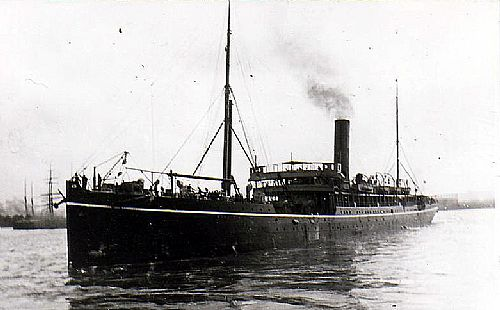
- Image of the SS Sardinia

History
- Name: SS Sardinia
- Owner: P&O 1902–1925
- Port of registry: Glasgow (United Kingdom)
- Builder: Barclay Curle & Company, Glasgow
- Yard number: 431
- Launched: 12 June 1902
- Fate: Sold to Kishimoto Kisen KK for demolition in Osaka, Japan 23 February 1925

General characteristics
- Tonnage: 6574 (GRT)
- Length: 450ft 3in
- Beam: 52ft 3in
- Draught: 27ft 2in
- Installed power: Two three-cylinder triple expansion steam engines
- Propulsion: Twin screws
- Speed: 14 knots

SS Sardinia was a cargo liner operated by the Peninsular and Oriental Steam Navigation Company between 1902 and 1925, providing both passenger and cargo services on various routes.

== Service history ==
SS Sardinia was built by Barclay Curle & Company of Glasgow, Scotland, and entered service with the Peninsular and Oriental Steam Navigation Company after she was launched on 12 June 1902. She was immediately chartered by the British government as a transport ship to bring back troops from the recently ended Second Boer War in South Africa, and had her maiden voyage from London to Cape Town in August 1902.

She was torpedoed in the starboard bow by a German submarine, while in convoy in the Mediterranean during the First World War. Her passengers and most of the crew were transferred to a warship, but senior officers and some crew remained on board. To prevent one of her forward bulkheads from collapsing, she sailed backwards for over 60 miles at a speed of 3.5 knots, eventually arriving in Oran, where temporary repairs were made. Permanent repairs were then made in Gibraltar.

Sardinia spent her entire life in service with P&O, and was eventually sold for scrap. She was taken to Osaka, Japan for demolition on 20 July 1925.
