= History of banking in China =

The history of banking in China includes the business of dealing with money and credit transactions in China.

== Imperial China ==
=== Early Chinese banks ===
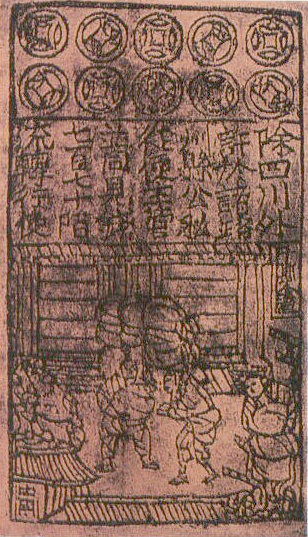
Jiaozi, the world's first paper-printed currency, an innovation of the Song era (960–1279).

Foreign counting houses called guifang sprang up during the height of the Tang dynasty in China in the 600s, where merchants could deposit funds for protection and could draft checks third parties could cash for those deposits. By the time the Song dynasty began in 960, Chinese financial institutions were conducting all major banking functions, including the acceptance of deposits, the making of loans, issuing notes, money exchange, and long-distance remittance of money. In 1024, the first paper currency was issued by the state in Sichuan.

Under the Ming dynasty in the 1440s, the confidence in fiat money was so undermined that China abandoned the Great Ming Treasure Note paper money around 1445. The latter Ming and Qing dynasties both regressed to commodity money in response. The single whip tax reform by Grand Secretary Zhang Juzheng's in 1581 had mandated the payment of taxes to be made in bulk silver only, this reform had re-energised the exchange shop business.

Two major types of early Chinese banking institutions are piaohao and qianzhuang. The first nationwide private financial system, so-called "draft banks" or piaohao (simplified Chinese: 票号; traditional Chinese: 票號) was created by the Shanxi merchants during the Qing dynasty. Smaller scale local banking institutions called qianzhuang (simplified Chinese: 钱庄; traditional Chinese: 錢莊), more often cooperated than competed with Piaohao in China's financial market.

Due to structural weaknesses of traditional Chinese law, Chinese financial institutions focused primarily on commercial banking based on close familial and personal relationships, and their working capital was primarily based on the float from short-term money transfers rather than long-term demand deposits. The modern concepts of consumer banking and fractional reserve banking never developed among traditional Chinese banks and were introduced to China by European bankers in the 19th century.

A major difference between the piaohao and the qianzhuang was that the qianzhuang banking companies grew out of the money-changing businesses known as the qianpu and would engage in business typical of banks such as providing loans, savings accounts with interest, and so forth, while the piaohao would primarily facilitate the sending of remittances, that is, the sending of money, across the Chinese realm.

Furthermore qianzhuang tended to be very locally run operations and were typically run only by a single family, or a close set of associates, in contrast the piaohao maintained branch offices across China, this allowed money to be paid into one branch office and withdrawn from another branch office - essentially "sent" - without there to be any actual physical silver sycees or strings of copper-alloy cash coins having to be arduously transported, under heavy guard, across great distances bringing many risks with them.

==== Piaohao ====
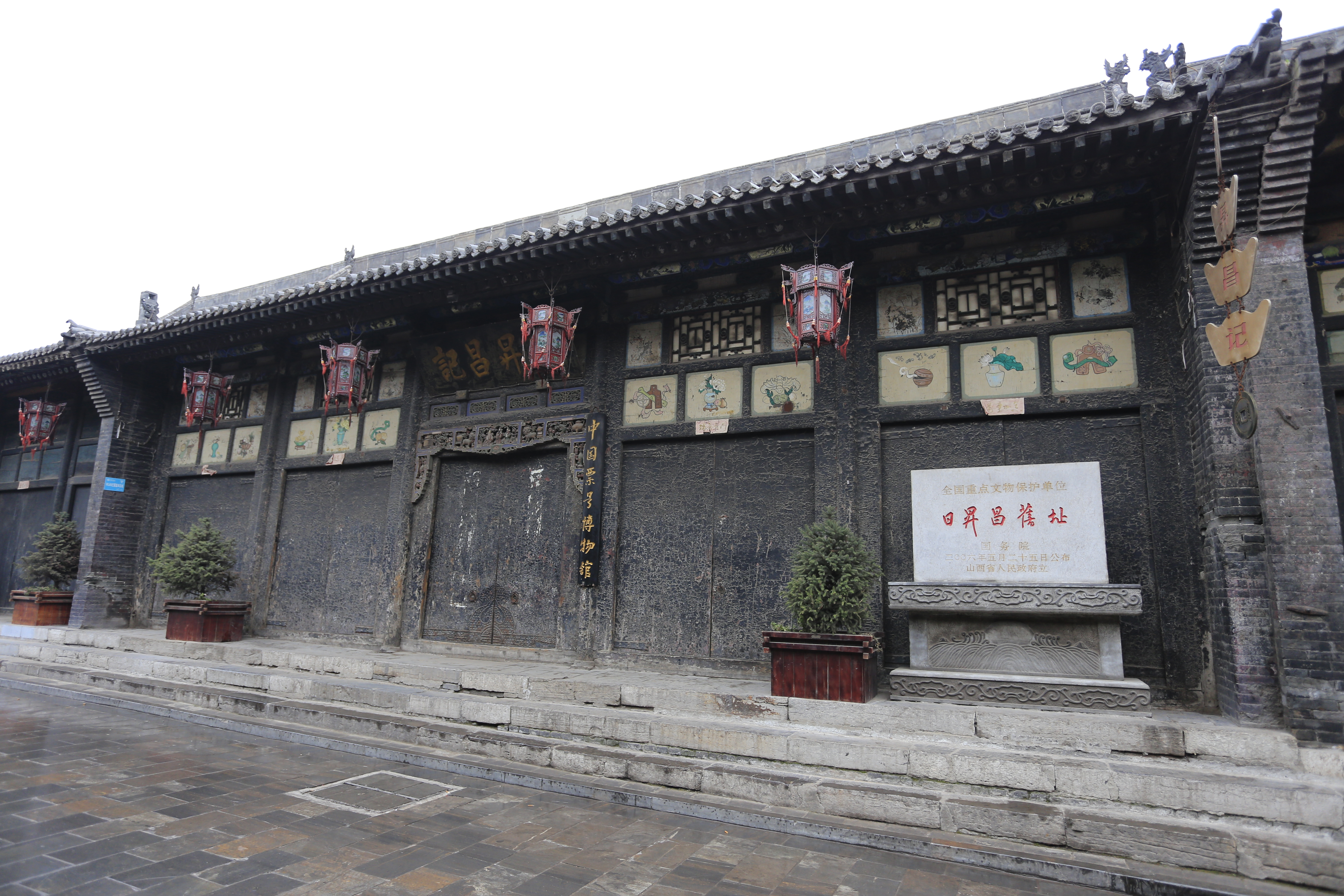
Rishengchang, the first draft bank in China

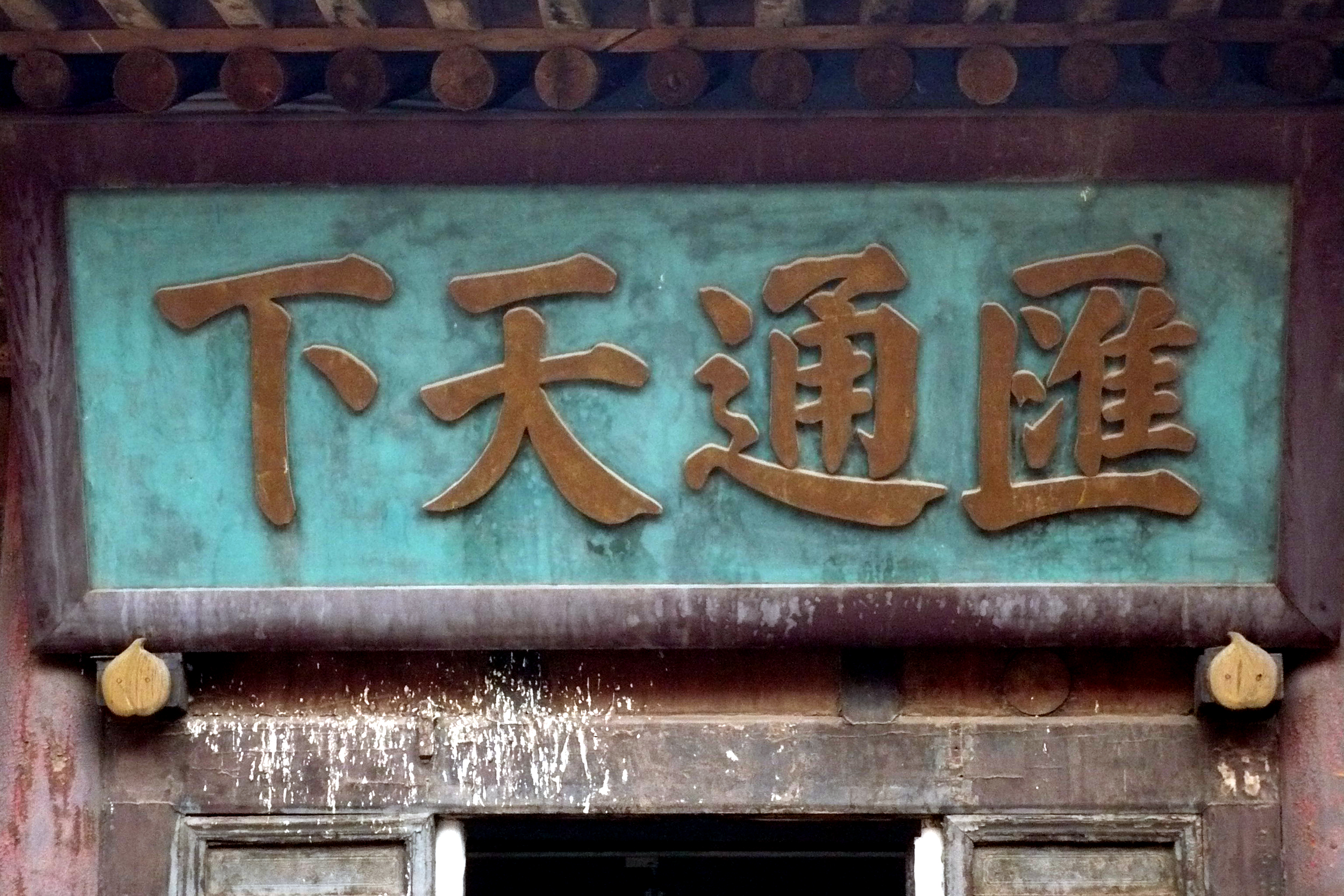
Royal inscribed board, saying "Financial exchange all over the world", in Rishengchang, Pingyao

An early Chinese banking institution was called the draft bank or piaohao (票号) in Chinese, also known as Shanxi banks because they were owned primarily by Shanxi merchants. The first "piaohao" Rishengchang originated from Xiyuecheng Dye Company Pingyao in central Shanxi. To deal with the transfer of large amounts of cash from one branch to another, the company introduced drafts, cashable in the company's many branches around China. Although this new method was originally designed for business transactions within the Xiyuecheng Company, it became so popular that in 1823 the owner gave up the dye business altogether and reorganised the company as a special remittance firm, Rishengchang Piaohao. In the next thirty years, eleven piaohao were established in Shanxi province, including Pingyao and neighboring counties of Qi County, Taigu, and Yuci. By the end of the nineteenth century, thirty-two piaohao with 475 branches were in business covering most of China, and the central Shanxi region became the de facto financial centres of Qing China.

All piaohao were organised as single proprietaries or partnerships, where the owners carried unlimited liability. They concentrated on interprovincial remittances, and later on conducting government services. From the time of the Taiping Rebellion, when transportation routes between the capital and the provinces were cut off, piaohao began involvement with the delivery of government tax revenue. Piaohao grew by taking on a role in advancing funds and arranging foreign loans for provincial governments, issuing notes, and running regional treasuries.

==== Qianzhuang ====
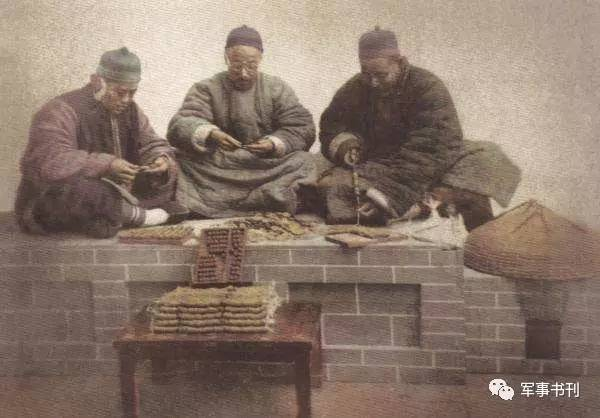
Qiánpù stringing cash coins, which was a typical service offered by the qianzhuang ("money shops") in imperial China.

Independent of the nationwide network of piaohao there were a large number of small native banks, generally called qianzhuang. These institutions first appeared in the Yangzi Delta region, in Shanghai, Ningbo, and Shaoxing. The first qianzhuang can be traced to at least the mid-eighteenth century. In 1776, several of these banks in Shanghai organised themselves into a guild under the name of qianye gongsuo. In contrast to piaohao, most qianzhuang were local and functioned as commercial banks by conducting local money exchange, issuing cash notes, exchanging bills and notes, and discounting for the local business community.

Qianzhuang maintained close relationships with Chinese merchants, and grew with the expansion of China's foreign trade. When Western banks first entered China, they issued "chop loans" (caipiao) to the qianzhuang, who would then lend this money to Chinese merchants who used it to purchase goods from foreign firms. It is estimated that there were around 10,000 qianzhuang in China in the early 1890s.

There were several financial crashes which occurred in China during which a large number of qianzhuang closed, the largest of these occurred in the years 1883, 1910, and 1911. By and by the traditional qianzhuang banks were being replaced by modern credit banks in China, particularly those residing in Shanghai. This would continue to happen well into the Republican period. The last qianzhuang banks were nationalised in 1952 by the government of the People's Republic of China.

During the 1990s qianzhuang made a come back in Mainland China, these new qianzhuang are informal financial companies which are often operating just within the edges of what is legal. The government attitude towards these new qianzhuang isn't that much different from their attitude in the 1950s.

=== Entry of foreign banks ===
British and other European banks entered China around the middle of the nineteenth century to service the growing number of Western trade firms. The Chinese coined the term yinhang (銀行), meaning "silver institution", for the English word "bank". The first foreign bank in China was the Bombay-based British Oriental Bank Corporation (東藩匯理銀行), which opened branches in Hong Kong, Guangzhou and Shanghai in the 1840s. Other British banks followed suit and set up their branches in China one after another. The British enjoyed a virtual monopoly on modern banking for forty years. The Hong Kong and Shanghai Banking Corporation (香港上海匯豐銀行), now HSBC, established in 1865 in Hong Kong, later became the largest foreign bank in China.

In the early 1890s, Germany's Deutsch-Asiatische Bank (德華銀行), Japan's Yokohama Specie Bank (橫濱正金銀行), France's Banque de l'Indochine (東方匯理銀行), and Russia's Russo-Asiatic Bank (華俄道勝銀行) opened branches in China and challenged British ascendancy in China's financial market. By the end of the nineteenth century there were nine foreign banks with forty-five branches in China's treaty ports.

At the time due to unfair treaties, foreign banks enjoyed extraterritorial rights. They also enjoyed complete control over China's international remittance and foreign trade financing. Being unregulated by the Chinese government, they were free to issue banknotes for circulation. They also accepted deposits from Chinese government institutions and Chinese private customers and provided and received loans from qianzhuang.

=== Government banks ===
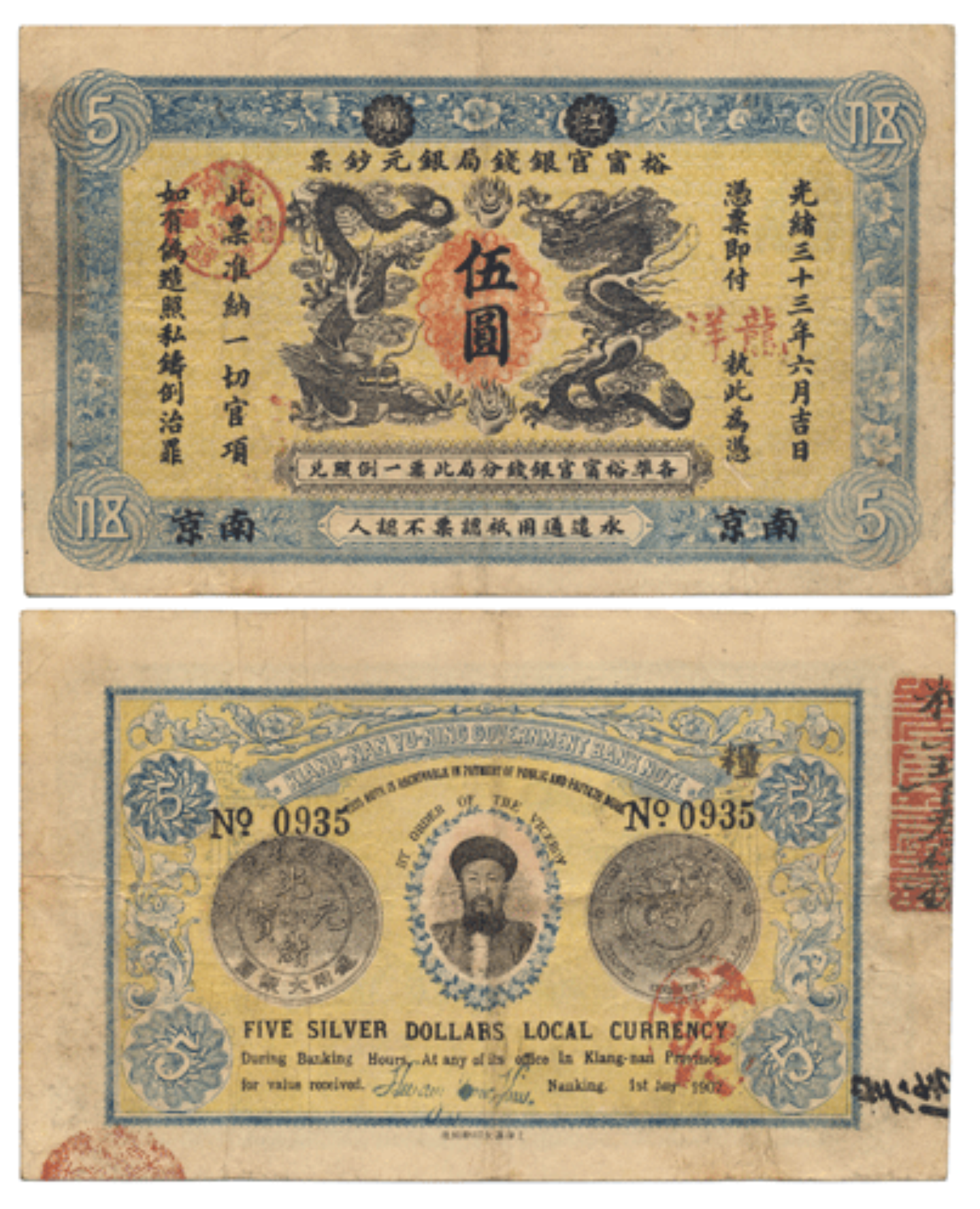
A banknote of 5 Dragon dollars issued in 1907 by the Kiangnan Yu-Ning Government Bank for circulation in the Jiangnan region.

After the launch of the Self-strengthening movement, the Qing government began initiating large industrial projects which required large amounts of capital. Though the existing domestic financial institutions provided sufficient credit and transfer facilities to support domestic trade and worked well with small-scale enterprises, they could not meet China's new financial demands. China turned to foreign banks for large scale and long term finance. Following a series of military defeats, the Qing government was forced to borrow from foreign banks and syndicates to finance its indemnity payments to foreign powers.

A number of proposals were made by a modern Chinese banking institution from the 1860s onwards. Li Hongzhang, one of the leaders of the self-strengthening movement, made serious efforts to create a foreign-Chinese joint bank in 1885 and again in 1887.

The Imperial Bank of China (中國通商銀行), China's first modern bank, opened for business in 1897. The bank was organised as a joint-stock firm. It adopted the internal regulations of HSBC, and its senior managers were foreign professionals. After the proclamation of the Republic of China, the bank changed its English name to the Commercial Bank of China in 1912. The name more accurately translated its Chinese name and removed any link to the Qing dynasty.

In 1905, China's first central bank was established as the Bank of the Board of Revenue (大清户部銀行). Three years later, its name was changed to the Great Qing Government Bank (大清銀行). Intended as a replacement for all existing banknotes, the Da Qing Bank's note was granted exclusive privilege to be used in all public and private fund transfers, including tax payments and debt settlements. Da Qing Bank was also given exclusive privilege to run the state treasury. The Board of Revenue that controlled most of the central government's revenue transferred most of its tax remittance through the bank and its branches. The government entrusted the bank with the transfer of the Salt Surplus Tax, diplomatic expenditures, the management of foreign loans, the payment of foreign indemnities, and the deposit and transfer of the customs tax in many treaty ports.

Following the Xinhai Revolution of 1911, Daqing Bank was renamed the Bank of China. This bank continues to exist today.

Another government bank, the Bank of Communications (交通銀行), was organised in 1908 by the Ministry of Posts and Communications to raise money for the redemption of the Beijing-Hankou Railway from Belgian contractors. The bank's aim was to unify funding for steamship lines, railways, as well as telegraph and postal facilities.

=== Private banks ===
The first private bank dates to 1897, courtesy of the entrepreneurship of Shen Xuanhui. Three private banks appeared in the late Qing period, all created by private entrepreneurs without state funding. The Xincheng Bank was established in Shanghai in 1906, followed by the National Commercial Bank in Hangzhou the following year, and the Ningbo Commercial and Savings Bank (四明銀行) in 1908. In that year, the Regulations of Banking Registration was issued by the Ministry of Revenue, which continued to have effect well after the fall of the Qing dynasty.

A lion's share of the profitable official remittance business was taken by the Daqing Bank from the piaohao. The piaohao all but disappeared following the Xinhai Revolution in 1911.

The same period saw the increasing power of private interests in modern Chinese banking and the concentration of banking capital. In Shanghai, the so-called "southern three banks" (南三行) were established. They were the Shanghai Commercial and Savings Bank (上海商業儲蓄銀行), the National Commercial Bank (浙江興業銀行), and the Zhejiang Industrial Bank (浙江實業銀行). Four other banks, known as the "northern four banks" (北四行) emerged later. They were the Yien Yieh Commercial Bank (鹽業銀行), the Kincheng Banking Corporation (金城銀行), the Continental Bank (大陸銀行), and the China & South Sea Bank (中南銀行). The first three were initiated by current and retired officials of the Beijing government, whilst the last was created by an overseas Chinese.

== Republic of China ==
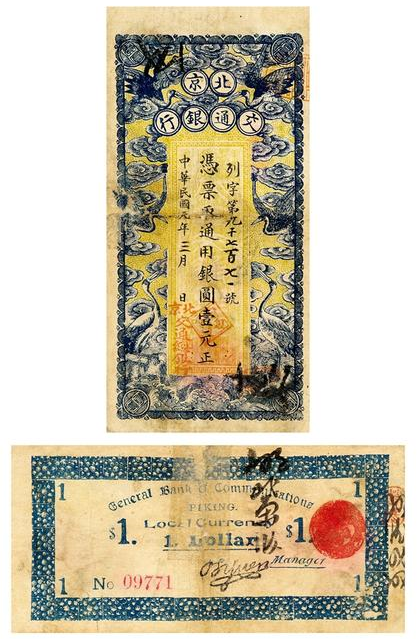
A banknote of 1 dollar issued by the General Bank of Communications during the first year of the Republic of China.

=== Note suspension incident ===
In 1916 the Republican government in Beijing ordered the suspension of paper note conversion to silver. With the backing of the Mixed Court, the Shanghai Branch of the Bank of China successfully resisted the order.

The Bank of China's bylaws were revised in 1917 to restrict government intervention.

=== Golden Age of Chinese banking ===
The decade from the Northern Expedition to the Second Sino-Japanese War in 1937 has been described as a "golden decade" for China's modernisation as well as for its banking industry. Modern Chinese banks extended their business in scope, making syndicated industrial loans and offering loans to rural areas.

The Nationalist government created the Central Bank of China in 1928, with T. V. Soong as its first president. The Bank of China was reorganised as a bank specialising in the management of foreign exchange while the Bank of Communications focused on developing industry.

The Bureau of Financial Supervision was set up under the Ministry of Finance, to supervise financial affairs.

Confronted with imminent war with Japan, the Chinese government took control of over 70 percent of the assets of modern Chinese banks through the notorious banking coup.

Modern banks had a significant role in China from 1900 to 1930.

=== Introduction of the Chinese national yuan ===
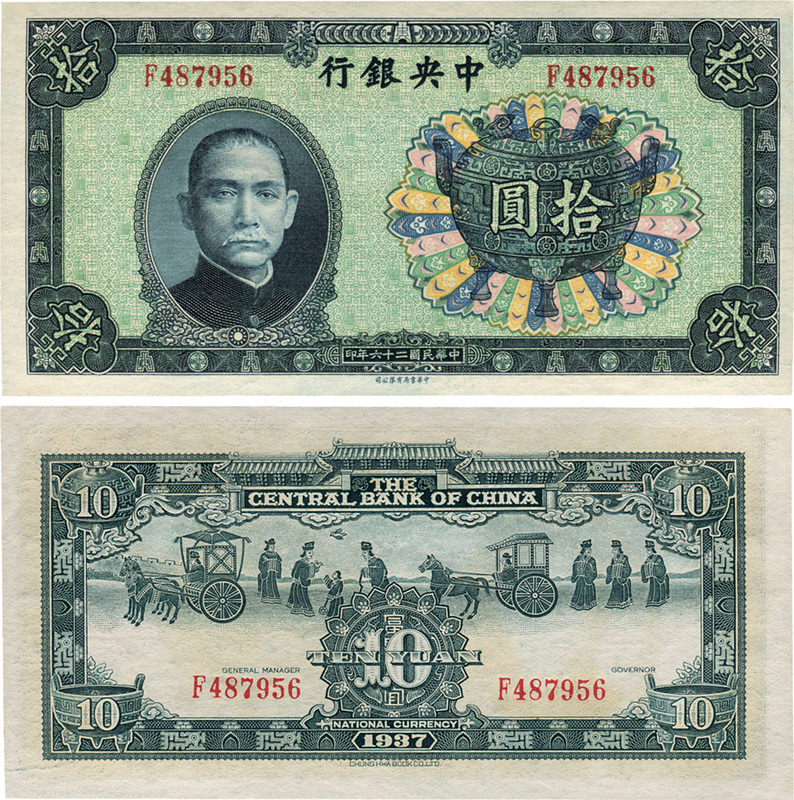
A banknote of 10 yuan issued by the Central Bank of China in the year 1937.

The role of non-government banks greatly decreased as the era of China's Nationalist government continued. As inflation grew, only government banks could attract deposits. By 1945, only 2% of deposits were held by private banks.

Following the 1935 currency reform, the government of the Republic of China introduced the fabi (法幣, "legal tender"), from November of the year 1935 to December 1936, the three officially sanctioned note-issuing banks issued the new paper currency, the fabi was completely detached from the silver standard. The Central Government of the Republic of China had enacted these currency reforms to limit currency issuance to three major government controlled banks: the Bank of China (中國銀行), Central Bank of China (中央銀行), Bank of Communications (交通銀行), and later the Farmers Bank of China (中國農民銀行). Chinese people were required by government mandate to hand in all of their current silver reserves in return for the newly introduced fabi, this was primarily done by the government in order to supply the silver that the Chinese government owed to the United States. The Chinese government and the central bank were careful to do a controlled release of about 2,000,000,000 yuan worth of new fabi banknotes, this was done in order to prevent inflation, and the government had taken many precautions to distribute these banknotes both gradually and fairly. In the first few months following the release of the fabi banknotes, the Chinese government did this to wait to see whether the Chinese public would place their trust in the new, unified Chinese currency.

=== Taiwan ===
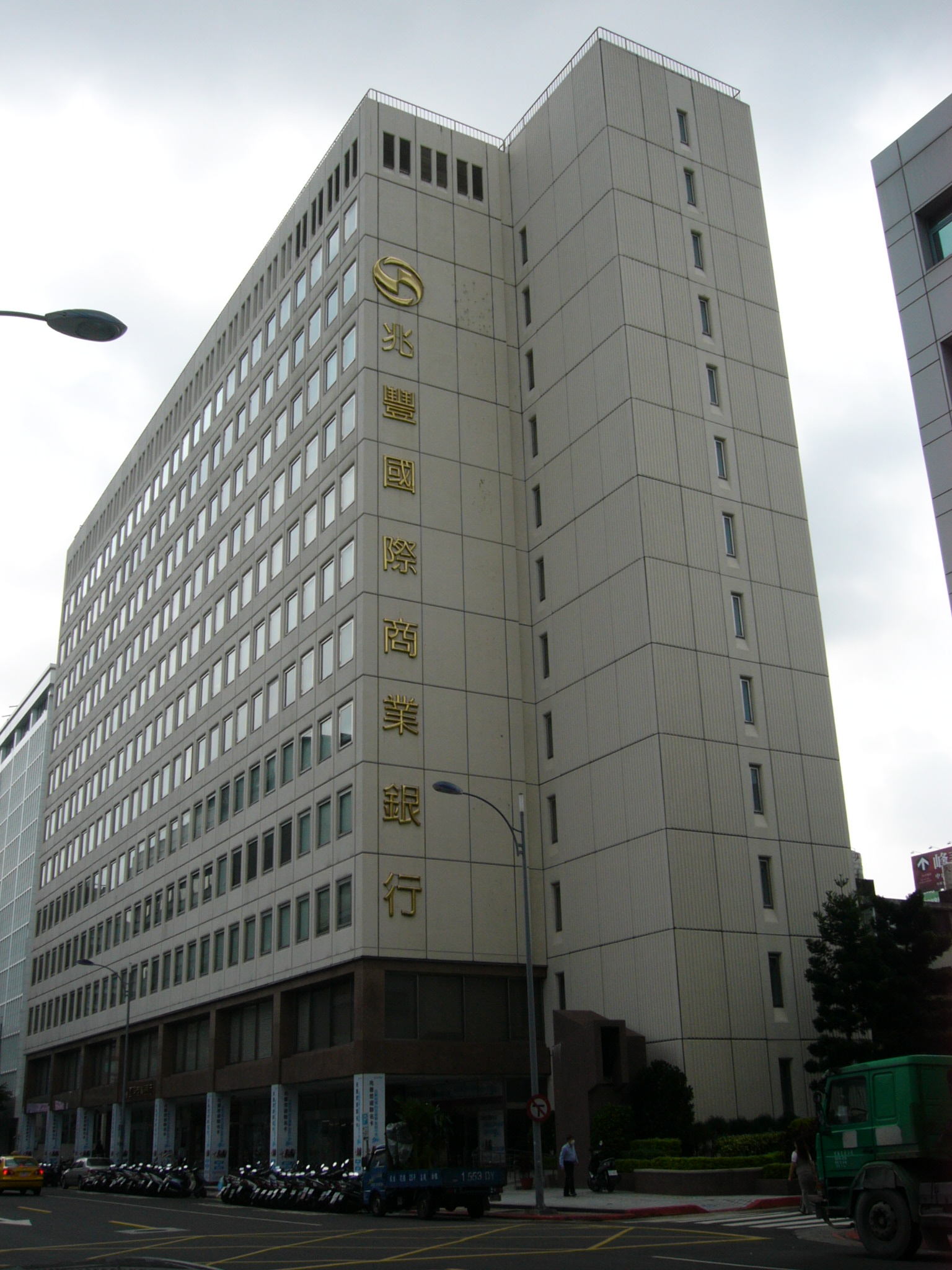
The headquarter office of the Mega International Commercial Bank in 2010, the Mega International Commercial Bank is a bank formed of the re-privatised Bank of China and Bank of Communications.

Following the Chinese civil war between the Kuomintang and the Communist Party, the General Management Office and the Bank of Communications accompanied the government of the Republic of China during their move to Taiwan. The branches of Chinese banks that had remained in mainland China were nationalised by the government of the People's Republic of China and branches of the Bank of China and Bank of Communications continued to be called "Bank of China" and "Bank of Communications". The branches of Chinese banks abroad would continue to serve overseas Chinese. These branches would also accept remittances and assisted the government of the Republic of China in handling foreign procurement matters.

In the year 1960, the General Management Office of the Bank of China was reopened in Taiwan, during this era the Taiwanese version of the Bank of China was a professional bank for international trade and exchange, and operated as a general commercial banking corporation.

On 25 October 1971, the Communist Party-run People's Republic of China replaced the Republic of China at the United Nations following the passing of Resolution 2758. In order to prevent all of its assets from being forcibly transferred to the government of the People's Republic of China as it was seen as a "successor state" that was "inheriting China" from the still existing Republic of China. For this reason the Bank of China in Taiwan was renamed to the "International Commercial Bank of China" (中國國際商業銀行), also referred to as the ICBC, it was later privatised by the government of the Republic of China.

== People's Republic of China ==
Mao Zedong's 1940 essay On New Democracy stated in a new democratic China, the state would "own the big banks and the big industrial enterprises." By the end of 1952, China's banking sector was nationalized.

The People's Bank of China was formed in 1948 as the merger of Huabei Bank, Beihai Bank, and Northwestern Farmer's Bank. The merger provided that People's Bank of China would function as the country's central bank and only commercial bank. The People's Bank of China held 93% of the country's financial assets. It was the only provider of credit, settlement clearance, and teller services.

=== After 1949 ===
Nationalization and consolidation of the country's banks received the highest priority in the earliest years of the People's Republic, and banking was the first sector to be completely socialized. In the period of recovery after the Chinese Civil War (1949–1952), the People's Bank of China moved very effectively to halt raging inflation and bring the nation's finances under central control. Over the course of time, the banking organization was modified repeatedly to suit changing conditions and new policies.

The early PRC banking system was highly centralized and based on a handful of state institutions. Banking regulations were adopted wholesale from the Soviet Union's banking regulations.

In 1950, the Bank of China became was made a bureau of the People's Bank of China. Pursuant to the 1953 "Regulations on Bank of China," it was made the only institution authorized to handle foreign currency and international payments. It was responsible for allocating the country's foreign exchange reserves, arranging foreign loans, setting exchange rates for China's currency and issuing letters of credit. The Bank of China had offices in Beijing and other cities engaged in foreign trade and maintained overseas offices in major international financial centers, including Hong Kong, London, New York City, Singapore, and Luxembourg.

The Agricultural Bank was created in the 1950s to facilitate financial operations in the rural areas. The Agricultural Bank provided financial support to agricultural units. It issued loans, handled state appropriations for agriculture, directed the operations of the rural credit cooperatives, and carried out overall supervision of rural financial affairs. The Agricultural Bank was headquartered in Beijing and had a network of branches throughout the country. It flourished in the late 1950s and mid-1960s but languished thereafter until the late 1970s, when the functions and autonomy of the Agricultural Bank were increased substantially to help promote higher agricultural production. In the 1980s it was restructured again and given greater authority in order to support the growth and diversification of agriculture under the responsibility system.

The People's Construction Bank managed state appropriations and loans for capital construction. It checked the activities of loan recipients to ensure that the funds were used for their designated construction purpose. Money was disbursed in stages as a project progressed. The reform policy shifted the main source of investment funding from the government budget to bank loans and increased the responsibility and activities of the People's Construction Bank.

Rural credit cooperatives were small, collectively owned savings and lending organizations that were the main source of small-scale financial services at the local level in the countryside. They handled deposits and short-term loans for individual farm families, villages, and cooperative organizations. Subject to the direction of the Agricultural Bank, they followed uniform state banking policies but acted as independent units for accounting purposes. In 1985 rural credit cooperatives held total deposits of ¥72.5 billion.

During the Cultural Revolution, the People's Bank of China suspended its commercial banking service. In 1969, the State Council approved the consolidation of People's Bank of China's headquarters as a bureau within the Ministry of Finance. Local People's Bank of China branches were merged into local government finance departments.

During reform and opening up, the Chinese government created a series of financial institutions. In 1978, the People's Bank of China was separated from the Ministry of Finance. Beginning that year and continuing through 1984, the People's Bank of China began spinning off its commercial banking functions. In 1979, the State Council approved the People's Bank of China's Proposal on the Reform of China's Banking System. This resulted in the establishment of the State Central Administration of Foreign Exchange (SCAFE), which managed China's then-small amount of foreign reserves. SCAFE became a subsidiary of the People's Bank of China in 1983 and became known by its current name, the State Administration of Foreign Exchange (SAFE).

During the 1980s the banking system was expanded and diversified to meet the needs of the reform program, and the scale of banking activity rose sharply. New budgetary procedures required state enterprises to remit to the state only a tax on income and to seek investment funds in the form of bank loans. Between 1979 and 1985, the volume of deposits nearly tripled and the value of bank loans rose by 260 percent. By 1987 the banking system included the People's Bank of China, Agricultural Bank of China, Bank of China (which handled foreign exchange matters), China Investment Bank, China Industrial and Commercial Bank, People's Construction Bank, Communications Bank, People's Insurance Company of China, rural credit cooperatives, and urban credit cooperatives.

In the mid-1980s the banking system still lacked some of the services and characteristics that were considered basic in most countries. Interbank relations were very limited, and interbank borrowing and lending was virtually unknown. Checking accounts were used by very few individuals, and bank credit cards did not exist. In 1986 initial steps were taken in some of these areas. Interbank borrowing and lending networks were created among twenty-seven cities along the Yangtze River and among fourteen cities in north China. Interregional financial networks were created to link banks in eleven leading cities all over China, including Shenyang, Guangzhou, Wuhan, Chongqing, and Xi'an and also to link the branches of the Agricultural Bank. The first Chinese credit card, the Great Wall Card, was introduced in June 1986 to be used for foreign exchange transactions. Another financial innovation in 1986 was the opening of China's first stock exchanges since 1949. Small stock exchanges began operations somewhat tentatively in Shenyang, Liaoning Province, in August 1986 and in Shanghai in September 1986.

Throughout the history of the People's Republic, the banking system has exerted close control over financial transactions and the money supply. All government departments, publicly and collectively owned economic units, and social, political, military, and educational organizations were required to hold their financial balances as bank deposits. They were also instructed to keep on hand only enough cash to meet daily expenses; all major financial transactions were to be conducted through banks. Payment for goods and services exchanged by economic units was accomplished by debiting the account of the purchasing unit and crediting that of the selling unit by the appropriate amount. This practice effectively helped to minimize the need for currency.

As part of the State Council's 1993 Resolution on Financial System Reform and its effort to modernize the financial sector, the People's Bank of China was assigned the role of managing the currency and preserving macroeconomic and financial stability.

In 1993, Zhu Rongji gave a speech in his capacity as governor of the People's Bank of China which helped serve as the basis for the subsequent development of China's policy banks. Zhu explained his view of how China's financial system should be structured, stating that the state "must establish a system of financial institutions, under the supervision of the central bank, principally consisting of national policy banks and state-owned commercial banks, but that encompasses a variety of financial institutions[.]" His proposed institutions included an export-import bank, a national interbank lending system, a short-term paper market, and an renminbi exchange rate mechanism based on the market rate. As researcher Zongyuan Zoe Liu writes, "The Party's contemporary economic power and financial influence are based substantially upon the institutions that Zhu envisioned in 1993, Fifteen years later, in 2008, China's policy banks and sovereign funds emerged on the global financial scene as some of the world's largest institutional investors, wielding significant influence over financial markets and projecting the Party's power abroad."

China issued its Commercial Bank Law in 1995. It allowed state-owned banks to be commercialized. The Commercial Bank Law stated that state-owned banks should operate on principles of efficiency and safety, take responsibility for profits and losses, and lend with a focus on "the need for the development of the national economy and social progress and under the guidance of state industrial policy."

In 1998, the Communist Party established the Central Financial Work Commission to be the implementing body for financial policies, coordinating regulatory agencies in the financial sector, conducting investigations and disciplinary inspections, and making personnel recommendations. In 2002, the commission was dissolved and most of its functions transferred to the newly created China Banking Regulatory Commission.

In 1999, the government established four financial asset management companies (China Cinda, Oriental, Great Wall, and China Huarong) to purchase and manage bad loans from state banks.

In 2003, Central Huijin was established as China's first sovereign fund and given the mission of recapitalizing China's banks.

Since 1949 China's leaders have urged the Chinese people to build up personal savings accounts to reduce the demand for consumer goods and increase the amount of capital available for investment. Small branch offices of savings banks were conveniently located throughout the urban areas. In the countryside savings were deposited with the rural credit cooperatives, which could be found in most towns and villages. In 1986 savings deposits for the entire country totaled over ¥223.7 billion.

== See also ==
- History of banking
- History of banking in Hong Kong
- History of banking in Italy
- History of banking in Malta
- History of banking in the United Kingdom
- History of banking in the United States
- History of economics
- Economy of the Song dynasty
- Economy of China
- Economic history of China (Pre-1911)
- Economic history of China (1912–1949)
