= Banking Standards Board =

The Banking Standards Board (BSB) was a body established in April 2015 in the United Kingdom, to promote good practice among banks and building societies. The original idea for the body came from the work of the Parliamentary Commission on Banking Standards and the subsequent Lambert Review, which called for a new type of organisation, different from traditional regulators, that would look at banking standards, culture and the root causes of poor behaviour. The BSB was renamed the Financial Services Culture Board and then closed in June 2023.

== Governance ==
The organisation was funded by the banks, but acts independently of them through its mission and a board composed primarily of non-bankers. The first chair of the BSB was Dame Colette Bowe. She was appointed by a selection committee chaired by the Governor of the Bank of England, Mark Carney. She was followed as chair by Susan Rice (banker) in 2019. Sir Brendan Barber served as vice-chair, and Alison Cottrell was the CEO of the organisation.

== The work of the BSB ==
The BSB conducted annual assessments of culture and behaviour at UK banks and building societies, and reported publicly on the state of the sector in its annual reports. The organisation's approach to assessing culture combines methods from economics, behavioural science, data science and ethnography, and has been described by Gillian Tett as "anthropologists with big data trying to use ways to track what bankers are doing, what they're feeling, to work out whether they have a good culture or not".

The BSB's work has highlighted gaps between ethical behaviour and banking activities, pressure and stress in the banking system, and concerns with speaking up. Beyond the UK banking sector, elements of the BSB's culture assessments have also been conducted for Irish banks, at the New York Federal Reserve and in insurance markets.

== Criticism ==
Members of the Treasury Committee examining the work of the BSB in 2018 criticised the slow progress made on fixing the UK's banking culture.

== See also ==
- Banking in the United Kingdom
- History of banking in the United Kingdom
