= History of banking in Italy =

History of the banking industry in Italy

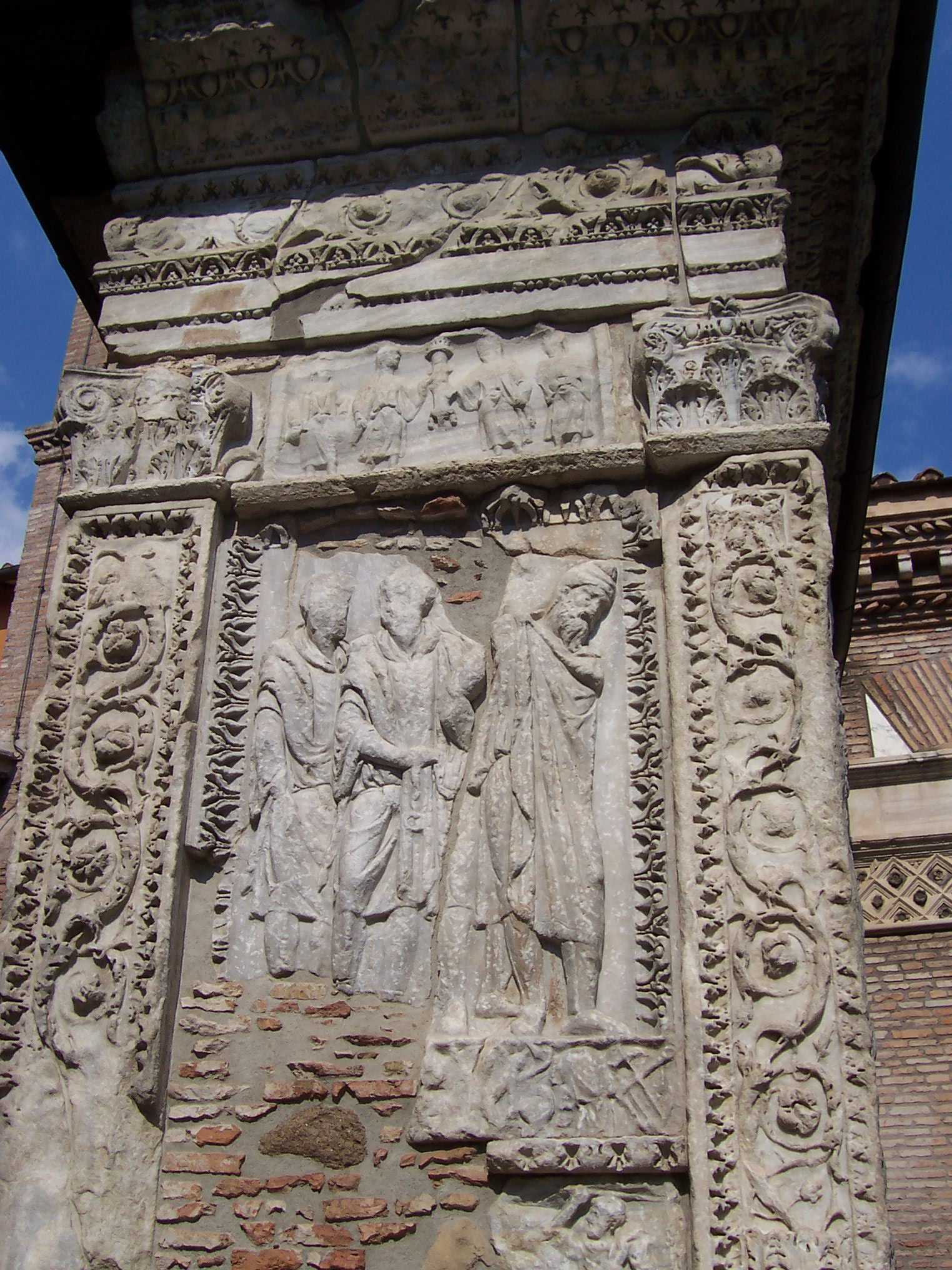
Arch of the Argentarii in Rome

The Etruscans and the early Romans did not have true minted coinage for many centuries. Debt and debt bondage, however, were probably rife. Wealthy landowners would make an "advance loan" of seed, foodstuffs or other essentials to tenants, clients and smallholders, in return for a promise of labour services or a substantial share of the crop. The terms of such "loans" compelled defaulters to sell themselves, or their dependants, to their creditor; or, if smallholders, to surrender their farm. Wealthy aristocratic Etruscan and Roman landholders thus acquired additional farms and service for very little outlay. It has been argued that this loan system can be considered an embryonic version of banking as practiced in antiquity.

With the eventual expansion of Roman monetization, a variety of officials came to be associated with banking in ancient Rome. These were the argentarii, mensarii, coactores, and nummulari; many of these roles were derived from Etruscan practices. The argentarii were money changers. The role of the mensarii was to help people through economic hardships, the coactores were hired to collect money and give it to their employer, and the nummulari minted and tested currency. They offered credit systems and loans. Between 260 and the fourth century CE Roman bankers disappear from the historical record, likely because of economic difficulties caused by the debasement of the currency.

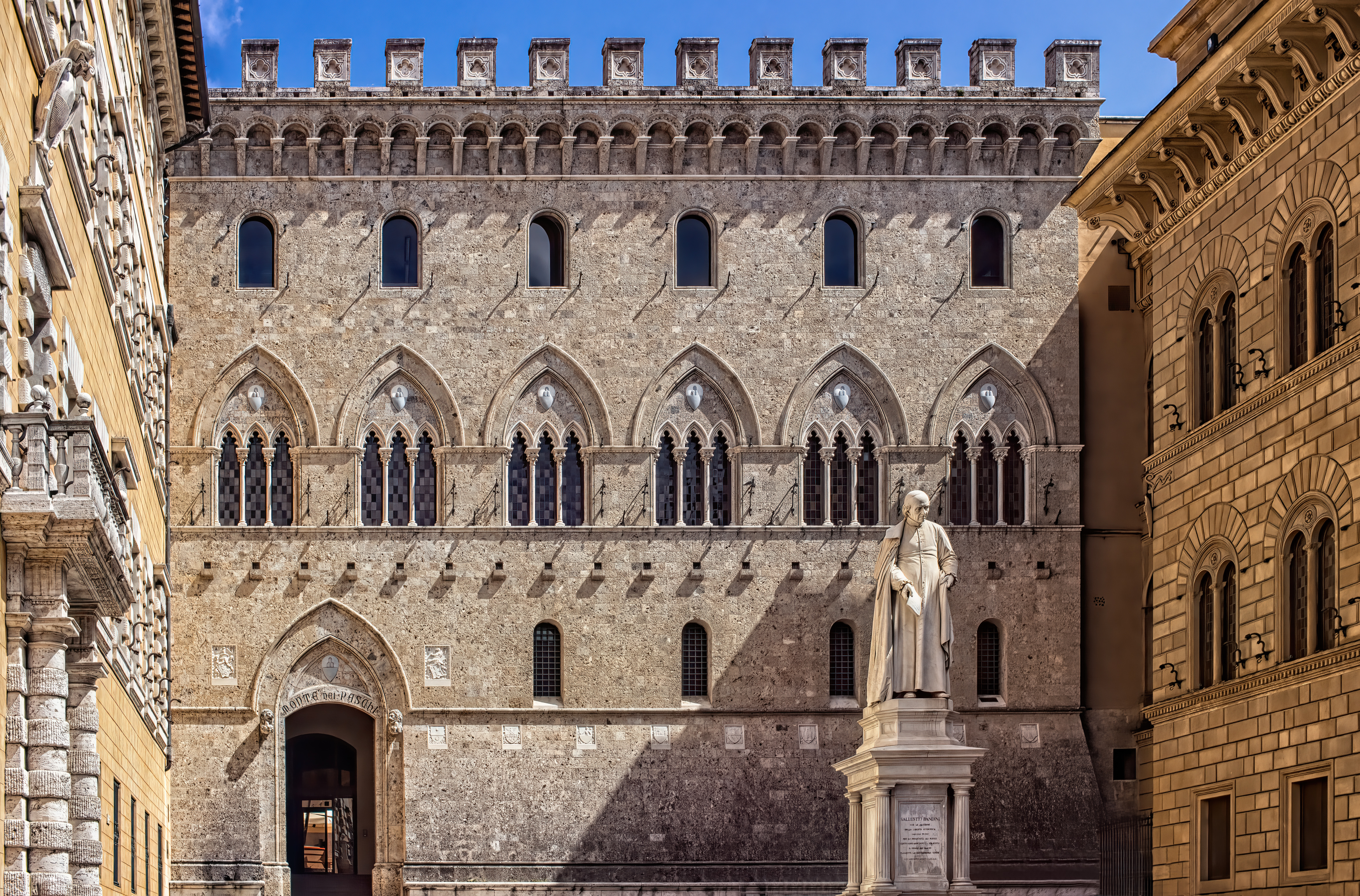
Banca Monte dei Paschi di Siena, founded in 1472, is the world's oldest or second oldest bank in continuous operation.

The headquarters of UniCredit bank in Milan

The origins of modern banking can be traced to the medieval and early Italian Renaissance, to the rich cities in the north like Florence, Lucca, Siena, Venice, and Genoa. The Bardi and Peruzzi families dominated banking in 14th-century Florence, establishing branches in many other parts of Europe.

One of the most famous Italian banks was the Medici Bank, set up by Giovanni di Bicci de' Medici in 1397. The earliest known state deposit bank, Banco di San Giorgio (Bank of St. George), was founded in 1407 in Genoa, Italy, while Banca Monte dei Paschi di Siena, founded in 1472, is the oldest surviving bank in the world.

In 1893, following the Banca Romana scandal, the Italian government formed the Bank of Italy, the nation's first central bank, as part of massive reforms to the banking sector.

== See also ==
- Economy of Italy
- Economic history of Italy
- History of coins in Italy
- List of banks in Italy
- History of banking in China
- History of banking in Hong Kong
- History of banking in Malta
- History of banking in the United Kingdom
- History of banking in the United States
