= Alison Cottrell =

British civil servant

Alison Cottrell, CB was the founding CEO of the Financial Services Culture Board, formerly the Banking Standards Board (to 30 June 2023) and formerly a British civil servant who worked for HM Treasury as joint Director for Financial Services and Director for Corporate Services, in which capacity she was a member of the Executive Management Board of the department. In her earlier career she was an economist. She was appointed Companion of the Order of the Bath (CB) in the 2015 New Year Honours.
