= History of banking in the United Kingdom =

Banking in the United Kingdom began in the Kingdom of England in the 17th century. The first activity in what later came to be known as banking was by goldsmiths who, after the dissolution of English monasteries by Henry VIII, began to accumulate significant stocks of gold.

== 17th century ==
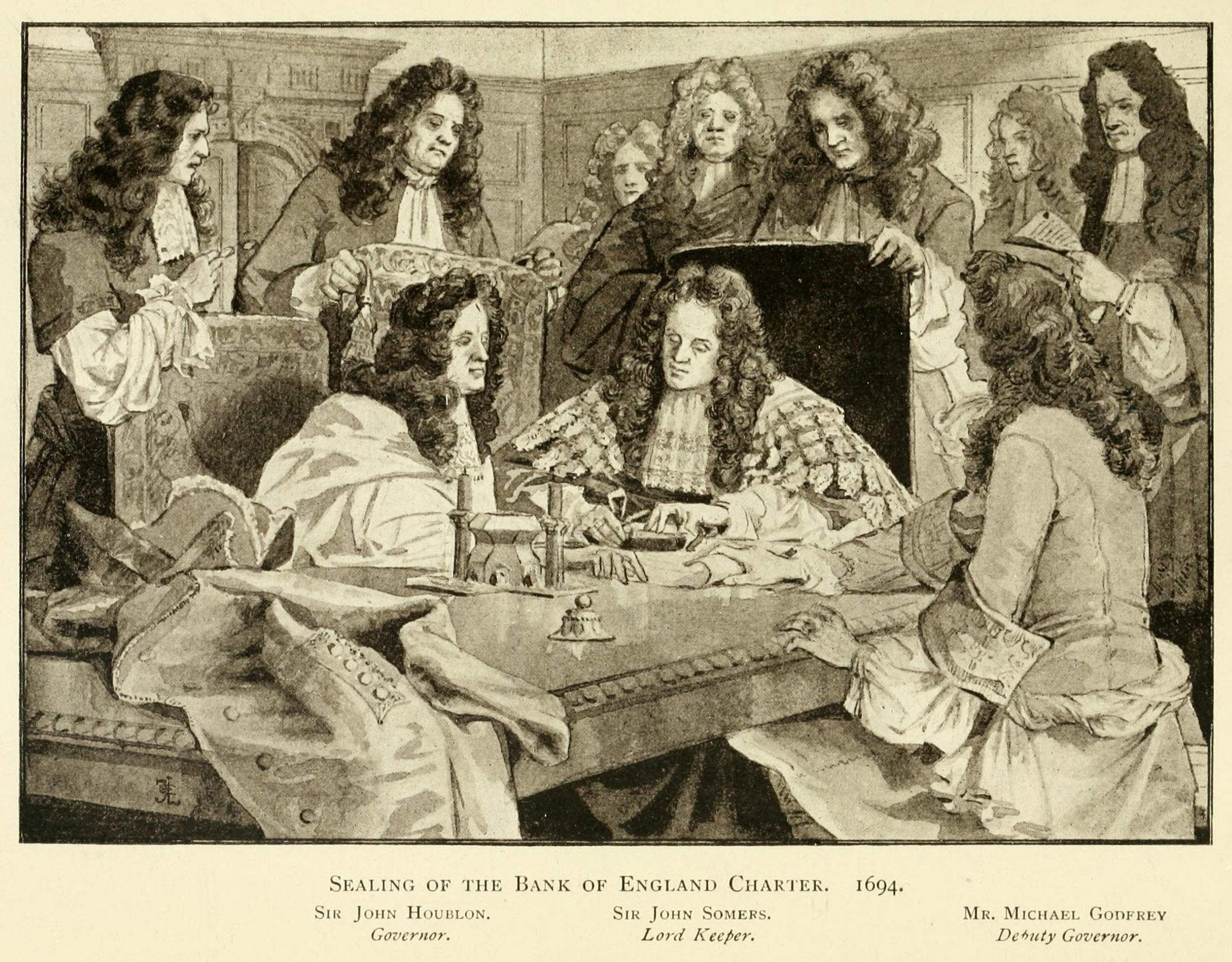
Sealing of the Bank of England Charter (1694), by Lady Jane Lindsay, 1905

Many goldsmiths were associated with the Crown but, following seizure of gold held at the Royal Mint in the Tower of London by Charles I, they extended their services to gentry and aristocracy as the Royal Mint was no longer considered a safe place to keep gold. Goldsmiths came to be known as 'keepers of running cash' and they accepted gold in exchange for a receipt as well as accepting written instructions to pay back, even to third parties. This instruction was the forerunner to the modern banknote or cheque. Around 1650, a cloth merchant, Thomas Smith opened the first provincial bank in Nottingham. During 1694 the Bank of England was founded.

The Governor and Company of the Bank of Scotland was established by an act of the Parliament of Scotland, the Bank of Scotland Act 1695 (c. 88 (S)) on 17 July 1695, the "Act for erecting a Bank in Scotland", opening for business in February 1696. Although established soon after the Bank of England, the Bank of Scotland was a very different institution. Where the Bank of England was established specifically to finance defence spending by the English government, the Bank of Scotland was established by the Scottish government to support Scottish business, and was prohibited from lending to the government without parliamentary approval. The founding act granted the bank a monopoly on public banking in Scotland for 21 years, permitted the bank's directors to raise a nominal capital of £1,200,000 pounds Scots (£100,000 pounds Sterling), gave the proprietors (shareholders) limited liability, and in the final clause (repealed only in 1920) made all foreign-born proprietors naturalised Scotsmen "to all Intents and Purposes whatsoever". John Holland, an Englishman, was one of the bank's founders. Its first chief accountant was George Watson.

== 18th century ==
In the 18th century clearing facilities, security investments and overdraft protections were introduced. An act of Parliament in 1708 restricted banks with more than six partners from issuing banknotes, strengthening the position of the Bank of England. This had the effect of keeping private banks as small partnerships. Joint stock investment companies were already well established, but joint stock banks did not become well established until the following century.

Many banks, known at the time as country banks, were established outside London, especially in growing industrial and port cities such as Manchester, Birmingham, Newcastle and Liverpool. Hundreds of country banks issued banknotes, whose circulation was mostly local: typically a country bank would only accept notes only from a small number of partner banks. By 1784, there were more than 100 country banks, and that number grew to more than 300 by 1793. Industrialists turned bankers, such as Fox, Fowler and Company, could assist their own industry since they not only provided a local means of payment, but also accepted deposits. In Scotland, country banks emerged even more quickly and played a more central role in economic development, partly because bullion was scarcer than in England.

Late in the century, the Industrial Revolution and growing international trade increased the number of banks, especially in London. New "merchant banks" facilitated trade growth, profiting from England's emerging dominance in seaborne shipping. Two immigrant families, Rothschild and Baring, established merchant banking firms in London in the late 18th century and came to dominate world banking in the next century.

Further impetus to country banking came in 1790 when, with England threatened by war, the Bank of England suspended cash payments. A handful of Frenchmen landed in Pembrokeshire, causing a panic. Shortly after this incident, Parliament authorised the Bank of England and country bankers to issue notes of low denomination.

== 19th century ==
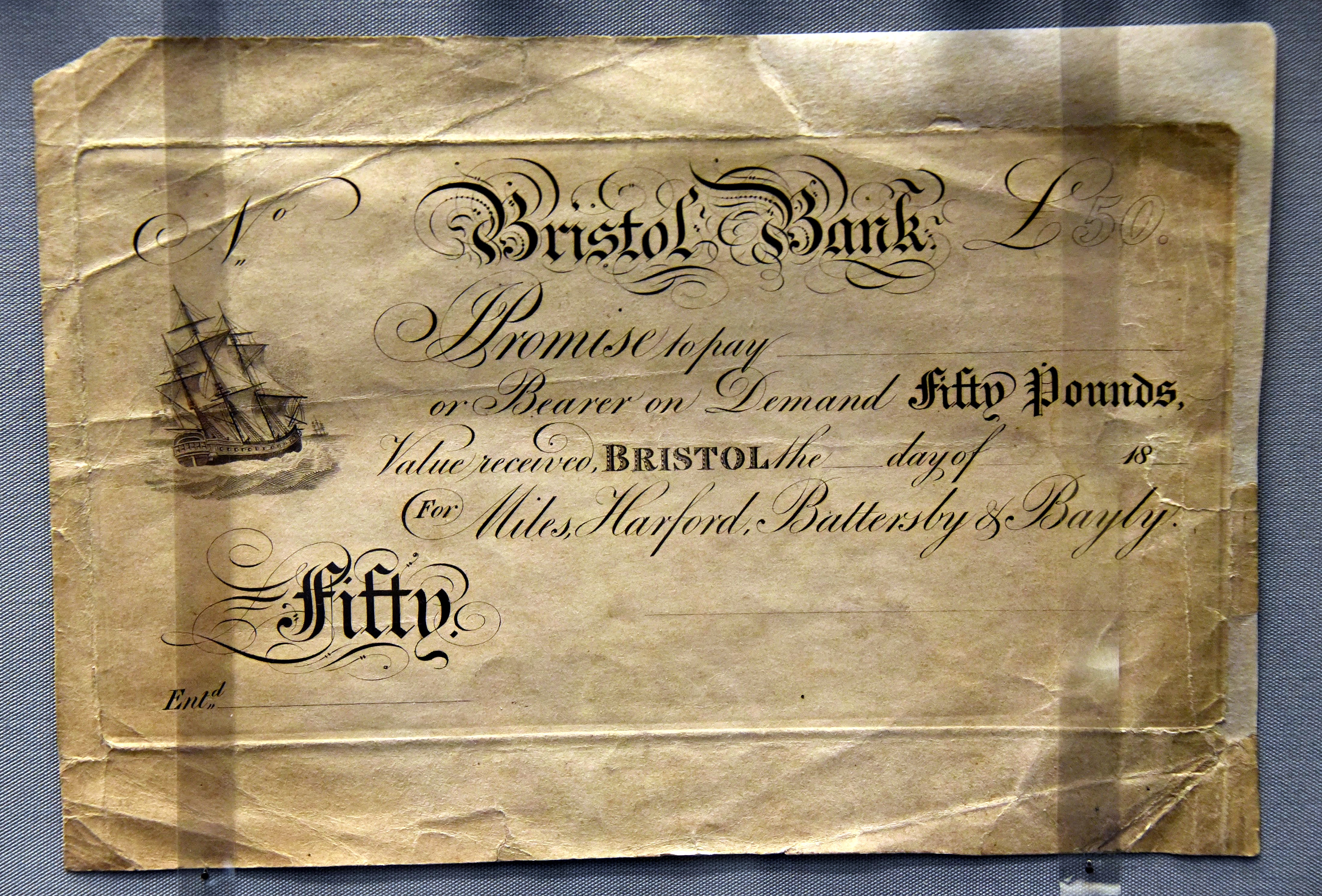
Bristol Bank 50 pound note, proof. Bristol, England, 1830s. On display at the British Museum in London

Country banks kept expanding during the Napoleonic wars, reaching more than 700 by 1810. By then, paper money had supplanted metallic coins as the main means of payment, with an aggregate banknote circulation around 21 million pounds. From 1826 on, partly because of concerns about conflicts of interest at country banks, the UK government started gradually restricting decentralized banknote issuance, starting with small denominations. The Bank Charter Act 1844 (7 & 8 Vict. c. 32) prohibited the creation of new issuing banks in England and Wales, and capped the issuance volume of incumbent ones. In the early 1830s, country banks still issued around 60 percent of all banknotes in England, but by 1844 the Bank of England issued 76 percent of the total. In parallel the Bank of England expanded its network of branches, albeit only where it viewed that as profitable rather than as a nationwide public service.

Also in 1826, the government lifted the restriction on joint-stock banks in England and Wales outside London, which had been introduced more than a century earlier; these so-called provincial joint-stock banks, inspired by Scottish practice, were not allowed to issue their own banknotes. There were 117 of them by 1843. The Bank Act of 1833 also authorized the establishment of non-issuing joint stock banks in London and its region, and allowed non-issuing joint-stock banks established elsewhere to open branches in London. In 1858, joint-stock banks were allowed to adopt limited liability. On 23 October 1826 a new joint stock bank, Lancaster Banking Company, was formed. However earlier that year the Bristol Old bank had converted from a private to a joint stock bank, making it the first joint stock bank. This was quickly followed by other institutions such as the Manchester & Liverpool District Banking Company and the National Provincial Bank. The National Provincial was the first bank to be considered a truly national bank with twenty branches across England and Wales.

Two banking collapses, one in 1866 and another in 1878 caused significant reputation damage but in consequence record keeping and accounting improved. The resulting new organisations became huge bureaucracies with a board of directors, general manager, secretary and an army of accounting clerks.

Banknote issuance by English banks other than the Bank of England became increasingly marginal. At a hearing in 1875, Walter Bagehot advocated authorizing all banks to issue banknotes, but his recommendation was not retained. In 1880, there were still 157 banks of issue in England and Wales, issuing notes for a total value of slightly above 6 million pounds. By 1900, there were only 55 with slightly above 2 million in circulation, and by 1914, just 11 with only £401,719 worth.

In 1896 twenty smaller private banks formed a new joint-stock bank. The leading partners of the new bank, which was named Barclay and Company, were already connected by a web of family, business and religious relationships. The company became known as the Quaker Bank, because this was the family tradition of the founding families. This bank eventually became Barclays PLC.

== 20th century ==
Between the wars, there was a decline to match the general depression of the time. But the banks fought back by taking action to recruit less wealthy customers and by introducing small saving schemes.

It would take until 1950 for real recovery where there was a huge increase in provincial branch offices and the emergence of the high street bank. Relaxation of some controls over mergers and acquisitions led to consolidation in the 1960s in which the Big Five became the Big Four, along with the takeover of several regional banks (Martins, District Bank, National Bank, Glyn Mills and William Deacons). At the same time the government launched a new banking service, the National Girobank. The Banking Act 1976 increased the supervisory role of the Bank of England.

Introduction of computing, credit cards and many new services continued to drive the expansion of banks and as deregulation was introduced competitiveness increased. Banks improved services, refurbished antiquated premises and brought in further technology such as ATMs, including the first in the world at Barclays Bank, Enfield on June 27, 1967.

The legal landscape surrounding credit was fragmented and lacked a cohesive framework. The Consumer Credit Act 1974, a major reform, was enacted to regulate consumer credit and hire agreements and to protect consumers from potentially unfair practices within the burgeoning credit market. Its scope encompassed a wide array of credit agreements, including credit cards, personal loans, hire purchase agreements, and point-of-sale finance deals.

Until 1970, the phrase "big five" (as opposed to "little six") was used to refer to the five largest UK clearing banks (institutions which clear bankers' cheques), which in England and Wales were:Barclays Bank; Midland Bank (now HSBC UK Bank and part of HSBC Holdings); Lloyds Bank (now part of Lloyds Banking Group); National Provincial Bank; and Westminster Bank. After the merger of Westminster Bank, National Provincial Bank and District Bank to form National Westminster Bank (now part of NatWest Group) in 1970, the term "big four" came into use instead.

== 21st century ==
In 2006, the Office of Fair Trading found that the banks were exploiting penalty bank charges on credit cards and has suggested that banks restrict such penalty to a maximum of £12. Penalty charges or Liquidated damages are illegal in UK contract law unless they represent the real cost of a breach of contract incurred through an unauthorised overdraft level or bounced cheque.

This ruling by the OFT had been taken by many customers to extend to their personal bank accounts and subsequently the UK small claims court system was flooded with cases of customers reclaiming these 'illegal' penalties. It was reported that nearly 1.8 million template letters to take the banks to court had been downloaded from the website MoneySavingExpert.com. In October 2009, the Supreme Court overturned previous rulings that allowed the OFT to investigate overdraft charges, bringing to an end such claims. Although initially the OFT said it would look at other ways to pursue the matter, in November that year it decided not to continue with further action.

Heads of major British banks met with the Governor of the Bank of England following days of market pressure on lenders' stocks. The Bank of England said after the 20 March 2008-meeting that participants had "agreed to continue their close dialogue with the objective of restoring more orderly market conditions."

As of 11 October 2008, the British banks have short-term liabilities equal to 156% of GDP or 368% of the British national debt, while the average leverage ratio (assets/net worth) is 24 to 1.

The number of independent banks shrank significantly during the 2008 financial crisis. Northern Rock was nationalised by the UK Government and later sold to Virgin Money, which was acquired by Nationwide in 2024. Bradford & Bingley followed, while Alliance & Leicester was acquired by Santander, a Spanish bank, and merged into Santander UK. On 18 September 2008, Lloyds TSB agreed to acquire HBOS—including Halifax and the Bank of Scotland—a transaction completed in January 2009, forming Lloyds Banking Group. TSB was later spun out of Lloyds.

The Financial Services (Banking Reform) Act 2013 calls for a paradigmatic shift toward the principle adopted by the US of risk averse strategies. This manifests itself in the form of "ring-fencing" retail banking to protect consumers and creating requirements for certain amounts of capital to be retained to act as a buffer against market instability. This reform is set to support the strengthening economy and is a response to the 2008 financial crisis.

Over the past 40 years (to 2014) the banking system in the UK experienced a 'dramatic shift' with total assets increasing from 100% of GDP to 450%, and it is 'plausible that the UK banking system will continue to grow rapidly', owing to its probable 'comparative advantage' in international banking services, with the pre-eminence of London as a financial centre.

As of December 2015, a number of new banking licences were secured, e.g. by Atom Bank and Tandem Bank.

In 2017, Business Insider came out with a list of the 18 most profitable banks in the United Kingdom while stating that the banks were now becoming profitable after facing challenges for the past few years. The top spot was grabbed by HSBC with an income of £5.49 billion followed by Lloyds with a profit of £4.04 billion.

Harrods Bank was acquired by Tandem Money Limited on 11 January 2018.

Under a scheme launched in September 2021, 159 can be dialled by phone to contact a selection of banks directly. This has been implemented as a method of preventing financial scams.

Tesco Bank was acquired by Barclays on 1 November 2024 from retailer Tesco. Sainsbury's Bank was sold to NatWest, FexCo, Allianz, NoteMachine and NewDay Group.

== See also ==
- 2008 United Kingdom bank rescue package
- 2009 United Kingdom bank rescue package
- Banknotes of the pound sterling § History
- Banking regulation and supervision § History
- Banking Standards Board
- British Bankers' Association
- British banking law § History
- Building society § History in the United Kingdom
- Credit unions in the United Kingdom § History
- History of banking
- History of banking in China
- History of banking in Hong Kong
- History of banking in Italy
- History of banking in Malta
- History of banking in the United States
