= Colette Bowe =

British civil servant

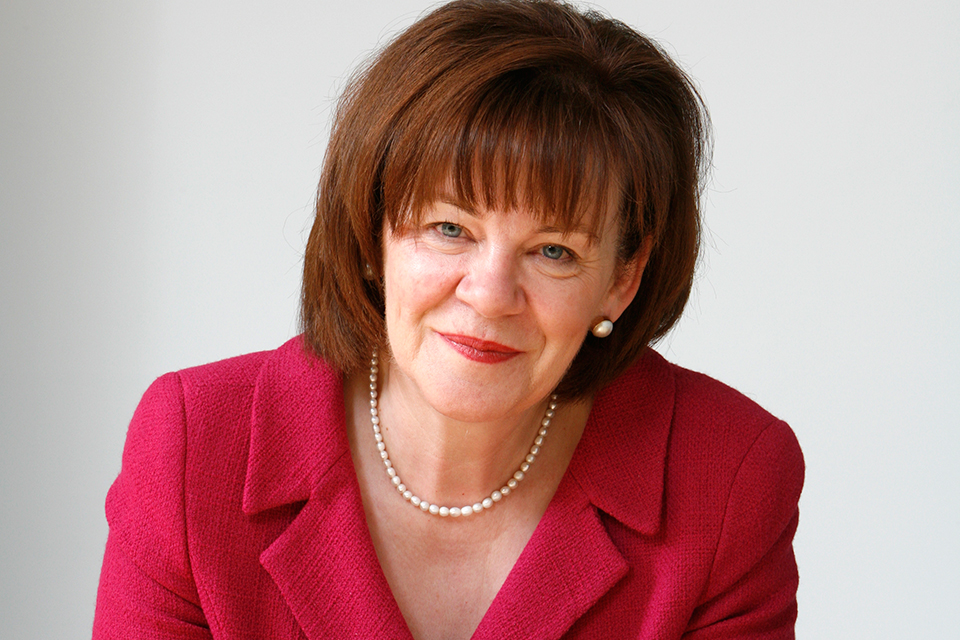
Dame Colette Bowe

Dame Mary Colette Bowe DBE (born November 1946) is a British businesswoman and former civil servant.

Born in Liverpool, Bowe has a Ph.D. in economics from Queen Mary University of London. In her career, she was in the UK civil service from 1975 to 1987. She was involved in the Westland affair as she was the chief information officer at the Department of Trade and Industry. In an interview given to Charles Moore for his authorised biography of Margaret Thatcher, Bowe ended her long-standing refusal to discuss the issue.

She was chair of Ofcom from 2009 to 2014, chair of Electra Private Equity plc from 2010 to 2014 and chair of the Council of Queen Mary University of London from 2004 to 2009. She has also served on the boards of Thames Water Utilities, London and Continental Railways, Axa IM, Morgan Stanley and the Yorkshire Building Society. She founded and was first chair of the Telecoms Ombudsman Service (now Ombudsman Services) in 2002–2003. She was the first chair of the Ofcom Consumer Panel (2003–2008), and has worked as the executive chair of the distribution arm of Fleming Asset Management.

Bowe was the chairperson of the Banking Standards Board (2014-2019) and the Associated Board of the Royal Schools of Music (2012-2018), the president of the Voice of the Listener & Viewer, a trustee of The Tablet and the Nuffield Foundation, and has also been a visiting fellow of Nuffield College, where she is currently chair of the Fellows Remuneration Review Committee. She has also been a board member of the UK Statistics Authority and a non-executive director of the Department for Transport. She was an external member of the Financial Policy Committee of the Bank of England (2019-2025).

She is a Trustee of the Roman Catholic Diocese of Westminster and chair of the Risk and Audit Committee of the National Institute of Teaching.

== Honours ==
She was made a Dame Commander of the Order of the British Empire in the 2014 New Year Honours for services to media and communications. She was made a Fellow of the Royal Economic Society in May 2025.
