= History of banking in Malta =

The term "bank" is attributed to the tables used by "trapezitai", ancient Greek bankers, which provided currency exchange, money storage and loan services, facilitating trade. (See main article: History of Banking)

== Timeline ==
=== 1530–1798 (Knights of St. John) ===
The Sacred Treasury of the Knights of St. John, known as "il Comun Tesoro", carried out some financial functions associated with a bank.

15 January 1598: Monte di Pietà was founded, providing low-interest loans against pawned items.

1635: Massa Frumentaria, a mediaeval grain fund established, while also serving as a precursor to an investment bank.

=== 1798–1800 (French occupation) ===
The French seized all the assets of the Monte di Pietà and Massa Frumentaria.

=== 1800–1812 (British Protectorate) ===
23 June 1809: Anglo Maltese Bank — first Maltese formal bank.

1 May 1812: Banco di Malta established, both precursors of Bank of Valletta.

1812: Tagliaferro and Sons founded — the first private merchant bank.

=== 1813–1964 (British Colonial Period) ===
1830 Scicluna's et fils bank founded – another precursor of Bank of Valletta and the first bank to open branches (three in Valletta by 1890) and introduce cheques in Malta.

1830s: James Bell & Co Ltd, a shipping agency, started to provide banking services to British military and navy personnel stationed on the island.

21 November 1833, Government Savings Bank founded as a savings bank, operating closely with Monte di Pieta.

1 June 1853: The Government Savings Bank opens a branch in Gozo.

1864 Anglo–Egyptian Bank founded, precursor of HSBC Malta and bankers for the British army from 1881.

4th October 1906: Banco di Roma opened a branch in Valletta until World War II.

1910: The Unione Cattolica San Giuseppe founds the Bank of Apostleship of Prayer or Bank ta’ San Guzepp later renamed APS Bank, a savings bank.

1911: Anglo Maltese Bank opens a branch in Gozo.

5 February 1919: Crédit Foncier d'Algérie et de Tunisie opened a branch in Valletta until World War II.

1925: Anglo–Egyptian Bank becomes part of Barclays Bank.

January 1946: Anglo Maltese Bank and Banco di Malta merge to form the National Bank of Malta (NBM).

1949: Scicluna et fils affiliated with the NBM group, as did Tagliaferro and Sons two decades later.

1955: Lombard Bank founded.

1961: Bank of Alderney opens a branch only to collapse a few years later.

1963: Bank of Industry, Commerce and Agriculture (BICAL) established as a small commercial bank.

=== 1964–2004 (Post-Independence Era) ===
17 April 1968: Central Bank of Malta established.

September 1969: the Central Bank of Malta released its first series of currency notes.

May 1972: the Central Bank of Malta released its first series of coins, following decimalisation.

November 1972: First major bank crisis in Malta following the fraudulent collapse of the Bank of Industry, Commerce and Agriculture (BICAL), previously established in 1963.

6 December 1973: A run begins on the NBM with the Central Bank declining to provide assistance, seemingly under directives from Dom Mintoff.

1974: Government takes over NBM without compensation to shareholders to set up Bank of Valletta.

1975: Barclays Bank's Maltese subsidiary is nationalised and becomes Mid-Med Bank.

1 April 1977: the funds of the Monte di Pietà were transferred to the Maltese government.

1983-1986: Deposits held with the Malta Government Savings Banks transferred to other banks

1990: The Bank of Apostleship of Prayer changed its name to APS Bank Ltd after being granted a commercial licence.

1992: Bank of Valletta was the first public company to be listed on the Malta Stock Exchange.

January 1993: Mid-Med Bank listed on the Malta stock exchange.

13 April 1994: Lombard Bank listed on the Malta stock exchange.

31 December 1997: The Massa Frumentaria formally dissolved by Act an of Parliament.

1999: HSBC acquires Mid-Med Bank, which becomes HSBC Malta.

June 2001: Fimbank plc listed on the Malta stock exchange.

23 July 2002: the Malta Financial Services Centre, governed by the Malta Financial Services Authority (MFSA), became the sole regulator of banking and other financial services.

1 October 2002 The Financial Intelligence Analysis Unit (FIAU) is established to combat money laundering and the funding of terrorism and to monitor compliance with relevant financial legislation.

=== 2004–Present (post EU membership) ===
2 May 2005: The Maltese lira enters the EU's Exchange Rate Mechanism (ERM II).

1 January 2008: Malta adopted the euro as its official currency. At the same time, the Central Bank of Malta joined the European System of Central Banks (ESCB) and became part of the European Central Bank (ECB).

2016-2018: The Panama Papers and Danske Bank money laundering scandal led to increased financial scrutiny of financial services.

22 March 2018: MFSA seize control of the Pilatus Bank in Malta following money laundering concerns and after its owner, Ali Sadr Hasheminejad, is arrested in the United States.

15 October 2018: MFSA placed Satabank under administration due to money laundering concerns.

September 2019: MONEYVAL published its Fifth Round Mutual Evaluation Report on Malta, highlighting weaknesses in Malta's banking sector in addressing money laundering and terrorist financing concerns, as well as the lack of resources and infrastructure in the country's anti-money laundering institutions.

May 2021: MONEYVAL issued a follow-up report confirming legal and regulatory reforms but that the country will remain under scrutiny.

June 2021: The FATF placed Malta on its grey list, highlighting deficiencies in the implementation of MONEYVAL evaluations.

17 June 2022: The FATF officially delisted Malta from its list of jurisdictions under increased monitoring, attributing this decision to the “significant progress” made in rectifying the strategic shortcomings noted in 2021.

27 June 2022: APS Bank listed on the Malta stock exchange.

== See also ==
- History of banking
- History of Malta
- Economy of Malta
- List of banks in Malta
- History of banking in China
- History of banking in Hong Kong
- History of banking in Italy
- History of banking in the United Kingdom
- History of banking in the United States
