= History of banking in the United States =

This article details the history of banking in the United States. Banking in the United States is regulated by both the federal and state governments.

== New nation ==
In the first half of the 19th century, many of the smaller commercial banks within New England were easily chartered as laws allowed to do so (primarily due to open franchise laws). The rise of commercial banking saw an increase in opportunities for entrepreneurs to borrow capital used to grow an enterprise. The small private banking sector saw a great deal of insider lending. Many of these banks actually spurred early investment and helped spur many later projects. Despite what some may consider discriminatory practices with insider lending, these banks actually were very sound and failures remained uncommon, further encouraging the financial evolution in the United States.

=== Early attempts to create a national bank ===
In 1781, an act of the Congress of the Confederation established the Bank of North America in Philadelphia, where it superseded the state-chartered Bank of Pennsylvania founded in 1780 to help fund the war. The Bank of North America was granted a monopoly on the issue of bills of credit as currency at the national level.

Robert Morris, the first Superintendent of Finance appointed under the Articles of Confederation, proposed the Bank of North America as a commercial bank that would act as the sole fiscal and monetary agent for the government. He has accordingly been called "the father of the system of credit, and paper circulation, in the United States". He saw a national, for-profit, private monopoly following in the footsteps of the Bank of England as necessary, because previous attempts to finance the Revolutionary War, such as continental currency emitted by the Continental Congress, had led to depreciation of such an extent that Alexander Hamilton considered them to be "public embarrassments". After the war, a number of state banks were chartered, including in 1784: the Bank of New York and the Bank of Massachusetts.

During the final decade of the 18th century, the United States had only three banks, while a wide variety of currencies circulated, including English, Spanish, French, and Portuguese coins, as well as paper notes issued by states and local governments. The values of these currencies were approximated and fluctuations in exchange rates were published. While values of various currencies did fluctuate geographically, this was irrelevant in a society dominated by local trades. Ron Michener of UVA discusses the colonial monetary situation in depth.

Supporters of the bank argued that if the nation were to grow and to prosper, it needed a universally accepted standard coinage and this would best be provided by a United States Mint, aided and supported by a national bank and an excise tax. Opponents of the bank argued that government monopolization of money was a corrupt exercise that would impoverish the people.

=== First Bank of the United States ===
In 1791, Congress chartered the First Bank of the United States. The bank, which was jointly owned by the federal government and private stockholders, was a nationwide commercial bank which served as the bank for the federal government and operated as a regular commercial bank acting in competition with state banks. When depositors brought state bank notes to First Bank of the United States, it would present these notes to the state banks, demanding gold, which hampered the state banks' ability to issues notes and maintain adequate reserves. Consequently, when First Bank of the United States' charter came up for renewal in 1811, it was met with a great deal of opposition from state banks and the renewal legislation was not passed.

The Second Bank of the United States opened in January 1817, six years after the First Bank of the United States lost its charter. The predominant reason that the Second Bank of the United States was chartered was that in the War of 1812, the U.S. experienced severe inflation and had difficulty in financing military operations. Subsequently, the credit and borrowing status of the Treasury was at its lowest level ever.

Private banking exploded rapidly after the war ended in 1815, culminating in the Panic of 1819.

=== Jacksonian Era ===
The charter of the Second Bank of the United States (B.U.S.) was for 20 years and therefore up for renewal in 1836. Its role as the depository of the federal government's revenues made it a political target of banks chartered by the individual states who objected/envied the B.U.S.'s relationship with the central government. Partisan politics came heavily into play in the debate over the renewal of the charter. "The classic statement by Arthur Schlesinger was that the partisan politics during the Jacksonian period was grounded in class conflict. Viewed through the lens of party elite discourse, Schlesinger saw inter-party conflict as a clash between wealthy Whigs and working class Democrats." (Grynaviski) President Andrew Jackson strongly opposed the renewal of its charter, and built his platform for the election of 1832 around doing away with the Second Bank of the United States. Jackson's political target was Nicholas Biddle, financier, politician, and president of the Bank of the United States.

Apart from a general hostility to banking and the belief that specie (gold and/or silver) were the only true monies, Jackson's reasons for opposing the renewal of the charter revolved around his belief that bestowing power and responsibility upon a single bank was the cause of inflation and other perceived evils.

During September 1833, President Jackson issued an executive order that ended the deposit of government funds into the Bank of the United States. After September 1833, these deposits were placed in the state chartered banks, commonly referred to as Jackson's "pet banks". While it is true that 6 out of the 7 initial depositories were controlled by Jacksonian Democrats, the later depositories, such as the ones in North Carolina, South Carolina, and Michigan, were run by managers who opposed Jacksonian politics. It is probably a misnomer to label all the state chartered repositories "pet banks".

=== 1837–1863: "Free banking" era ===
Prior to 1837 a bank charter could be obtained only by a specific legislative act, but in 1837, the Michigan Act allowed the automatic chartering of banks that could fulfill the Michigan's chartering requirements so as to no longer require special consent of the state legislature. The following year, New York enacted similar legislation with the Free Banking Act, and other states soon followed. These banks could issue bank notes against specie (gold and silver coins) and the states regulated the reserve requirements, interest rates for loans and deposits, the necessary capital ratio etc. Free banking spread rapidly to other states, and from 1840 to 1863 all banking business was done by state-chartered institutions.

While the banking systems of several states were initially unstable, over time financial indicators in most states stabilized. In the early years of free banking in many Western states, the banking industry degenerated into "wildcat" banking because of the laxity and abuse of state laws. Bank notes were issued against little or no security, and credit was overexpanded; depressions brought waves of bank failures. In particular, the multiplicity of state bank notes caused great confusion and loss. The real value of a bank bill was often lower than its face value, and the issuing bank's financial strength generally determined the size of the discount. However, after several years of experience, with the exception of a few exogenous shocks, different states developed more functional and stable banking industries.

== National Bank Act ==
To correct the problems of the "Free Banking" era, Congress passed the National Banking Acts of 1863 and 1864, which created the United States National Banking System and provided for a system of banks to be chartered by the federal government. The National Bank Act encouraged development of a national currency backed by bank holdings of U.S. Treasury securities. It established the Office of the Comptroller of the Currency as part of the United States Department of the Treasury, authorizing it to examine and regulate nationally chartered banks.

Congress passed the National Bank Act in an attempt to retire the greenbacks that it had issued to finance the North's effort in the American Civil War. As an additional incentive for banks to submit to Federal supervision, in 1865 Congress began taxing any of state bank notes (also called "bills of credit" or "scrip") a standard rate of 10%, which encouraged many state banks to become national ones. This tax also gave rise to another response by state banks—the widespread adoption of the demand deposit account, also known as a checking account. By the 1880s, deposit accounts had changed the primary source of revenue for many banks. The result of these events is what is known as the "dual banking system". New banks may choose either state or national charters (a bank also can convert its charter from one to the other).

At first this new national banking system grew very fast at the expense of state banks, but state banks quickly recuperated as the checking sector began to expand. Additionally, capital requirements for state banks were reduced, which aided their resurgence.

== Rise of investment banks ==
=== Civil War ===
During the Civil War, banking houses were syndicated to meet the federal government's need for money to fund its war efforts. Jay Cooke launched the first mass securities selling operation in U.S. history, employing thousands of salesmen to float what ultimately amounted to $830 million worth of government bonds to a wide group of investors. Acting as an agent of the Treasury Department, Cooke then reached out to the general public and personally led a war bond drive that netted approximately $1.5 billion for Treasury.

== Surging demand for capital in the Gilded Age ==
The rise of the commercial banking sector coincided with the growth of early factories, since entrepreneurs had to rely on commercial banks in order to fund their own projects. Because of this need for capital, many banks began to arise by the late 19th century. By 1880, New England became one of the most heavily banked areas in the world.

Lance Davis has demonstrated that the process of capital formation in the 19th century was markedly different between the British capital market and the American capital market. British industrialists were readily able to satisfy their need for capital by tapping a vast source of international capital through British banks such as Westminster's, Lloyds and Barclays. In contrast, the dramatic growth of the United States created capital requirements that far outstripped the limited capital resources of American banks. Investment banking in the United States emerged to serve the expansion of railroads, mining companies, and heavy industry. Unlike commercial banks, investment banks were not authorized to issue notes or accept deposits. Instead, they served as brokers or intermediaries, bringing together investors with capital and the firms that needed that capital.

=== Bimetallism and the gold standard ===
Bimetallism became a center of political conflict toward the end of the 19th century. To finance the Civil War, the U.S. switched from bimetallism to a flat greenback currency. In 1873, the government passed the Fourth Coinage Act and soon resumption to specie payments began without the free and unlimited coinage of silver. This put the U.S. on a mono-metallic gold standard. This angered the proponents of monetary silver, known as the silverites. They referred to this act as "The Crime of '73", as it was judged to have inhibited inflation.

The Panic of 1893 was a severe nationwide depression that brought the money issue to the fore. The "silverites" argued that using silver would inflate the money supply and mean more cash for everyone, which they equated with prosperity. The gold advocates countered that silver would permanently depress the economy, but that sound money produced by a gold standard would restore prosperity.

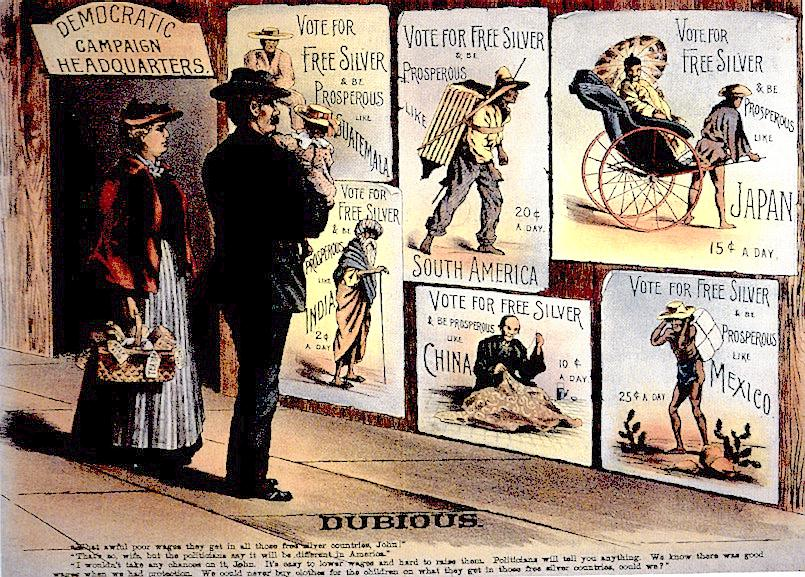
1896 GOP posters warn against free silver.

Bimetallism and "Free Silver" were demanded by William Jennings Bryan who took over leadership of the Democratic Party in 1896, as well as the Populist and Silver Republican Parties. The Republican Party nominated William McKinley on a platform supporting the gold standard which was favored by financial interests on the East Coast. A faction of Republicans from silver mining regions in the West known as the Silver Republicans endorsed Bryan.

Bryan gave the famous "Cross of Gold" speech at the National Democratic Convention on July 9, 1896. However, his presidential campaign was ultimately unsuccessful; this can be partially attributed to the discovery of the cyanide process by which gold could be extracted from low-grade ore. This increased the world gold supply and caused the inflation that free coinage of silver was supposed to bring. The McKinley campaign was effective at persuading voters that poor economic progress and unemployment would be exacerbated by adoption of the Bryan platform.

== Early 20th century ==
During the period from 1890 to 1925, the investment banking industry was highly concentrated and dominated by an oligopoly that consisted of JP Morgan & Co.; Kuhn, Loeb & Co.; Brown Brothers; and Kidder, Peabody & Co. There was no legal requirement to separate the operations of commercial and investment banks; as a result deposits from the commercial banking side of the business constituted an in-house supply of capital that could be used to fund the underwriting business of the investment banking side.

=== The Panic of 1907 and the Pujo Committee ===
In 1913, the Pujo Committee unanimously determined that a small cabal of financiers had gained consolidated control of numerous industries through the abuse of the public trust in the United States. The chair of the House Committee on Banking and Currency, Representative Arsène Pujo, (D–La. 7th) convened a special committee to investigate a "money trust", the de facto monopoly of Morgan and New York's other most powerful bankers. The committee issued a scathing report on the banking trade, and found that the officers of J.P. Morgan & Co. also sat on the boards of directors of 112 corporations with a market capitalization of $22.5 billion (the total capitalization of the New York Stock Exchange was then estimated at $26.5 billion).

Attorney Samuel Untermyer who headed the 1913 Pujo Money Trust Investigation Committee to investigate money trusts defined a money trust to George Baker during the Pujo hearings; "We define a money trust as an established identity and community of interest between a few leaders of finance, which has been created and is held together through stock-holding, interlocking directorates, and other forms of domination over banks, trust companies, railroads, public service and industrial corporations, and which has resulted in vast and growing concentration and control of money and credits in the hands of a few men".

The Pujo Committee Report concluded that a community of influential financial leaders had gained control of major manufacturing, transportation, mining, telecommunications and financial markets of the United States. The report revealed that no less than eighteen different major financial corporations were under control of a cartel led by J.P Morgan, George F Baker and James Stillman. These three men, through the resources of seven banks and trust companies (Banker's Trust Co., Guaranty Trust Co., Astor Trust Co., National Bank of Commerce, Liberty National Bank, Chase National Bank, Farmer's Loan and Trust Co.) controlled an estimated $2.1 billion. The report revealed that a handful of men held manipulative control of the New York Stock Exchange and attempted to evade interstate trade laws.

The Pujo Report singled out individual bankers including Paul Warburg, Jacob H. Schiff, Felix M. Warburg, Frank E. Peabody, William Rockefeller and Benjamin Strong Jr. The report identified over $22 billion in resources and capitalization controlled through 341 directorships held in 112 corporations by members of the empire headed by J.P. Morgan.

The findings of the committee inspired public support for ratification of the Sixteenth Amendment in 1913, passage of the Federal Reserve Act that same year, and passage of the Clayton Antitrust Act in 1914. They were also widely publicized in the Louis Brandeis book Others People's Money--and How the Bankers Use It.

=== The Federal Reserve System ===
The Panic of 1907 was headed off by a private conglomerate, who set themselves up as "lenders of last resort" to banks in trouble. This effort succeeded in stopping the panic, and led to calls for a Federal agency to do the same thing. In response, the Federal Reserve System was created by the Federal Reserve Act of 1913, establishing a new central bank intended serve as a formal "lender of last resort" to banks in times of liquidity crisis—panics where depositors tried to withdraw their money faster than a bank could pay it out.

The legislation provided for a system that included a number of regional Federal Reserve Banks and a seven-member governing board. All national banks were required to join the system and other banks could join. Congress created Federal Reserve notes to provide the nation with an elastic supply of currency. The notes were to be issued to Federal Reserve Banks for subsequent transmittal to banking institutions in accordance with the needs of the public.

The Federal Reserve Act of 1913 established the present day Federal Reserve System and brought all banks in the United States under the authority of the Federal Reserve (a quasi-governmental entity), creating the twelve regional Federal Reserve Banks which are supervised by the Federal Reserve Board.

=== Credit unions ===
Credit unions originated in Europe in the mid-19th century. The first credit union in the United States was established in 1908 in New Hampshire. At the time, banks were unwilling to lend to many poor laborers, who then turned to corrupt moneylenders and loan sharks. Businessman and philanthropist Edward Filene spearheaded an effort to secure legislation for credit unions first in Massachusetts and later throughout the United States. With the help of the Credit Union National Extension Bureau and an army of volunteers, states began passing credit union legislation in the 1920s. Credit unions were formed based on a bond of association, often beginning with a small group of employees. Despite opposition from the banking industry, the Federal Credit Union Act was signed into law in 1934 as part of the New Deal, allowing the creation of federally chartered credit unions in the United States. The Credit Union National Association (CUNA) was formed and by 1937, 6400 credit unions with 1.5 million members were active in 45 states. Today there are over 9500 credit unions in the United States and they are regulated by the National Credit Union Administration (NCUA).

=== McFadden Act ===
The McFadden Act was enacted in 1927 based on recommendations made by the comptroller of the currency, Henry May Dawes. The Act sought to give national banks competitive equality with state-chartered banks by letting national banks branch to the extent permitted by state law. The McFadden Act specifically prohibited interstate branching by allowing each national bank to branch only within the state in which it is situated. This prohibition did not extend to state-chartered banks which were not members of the Federal Reserve. However, as of 1993, only four states permitted reciprocal interstate branching, and these laws were rarely used by the state-chartered banks who could use them under the McFadden Act.

Although the Riegle-Neal Interstate Banking and Branching Efficiency Act of 1994 repealed this provision of the McFadden Act, it specified that state law continues to control intrastate branching, or branching within a state's borders, for both state and national banks.

=== Savings and loan associations ===
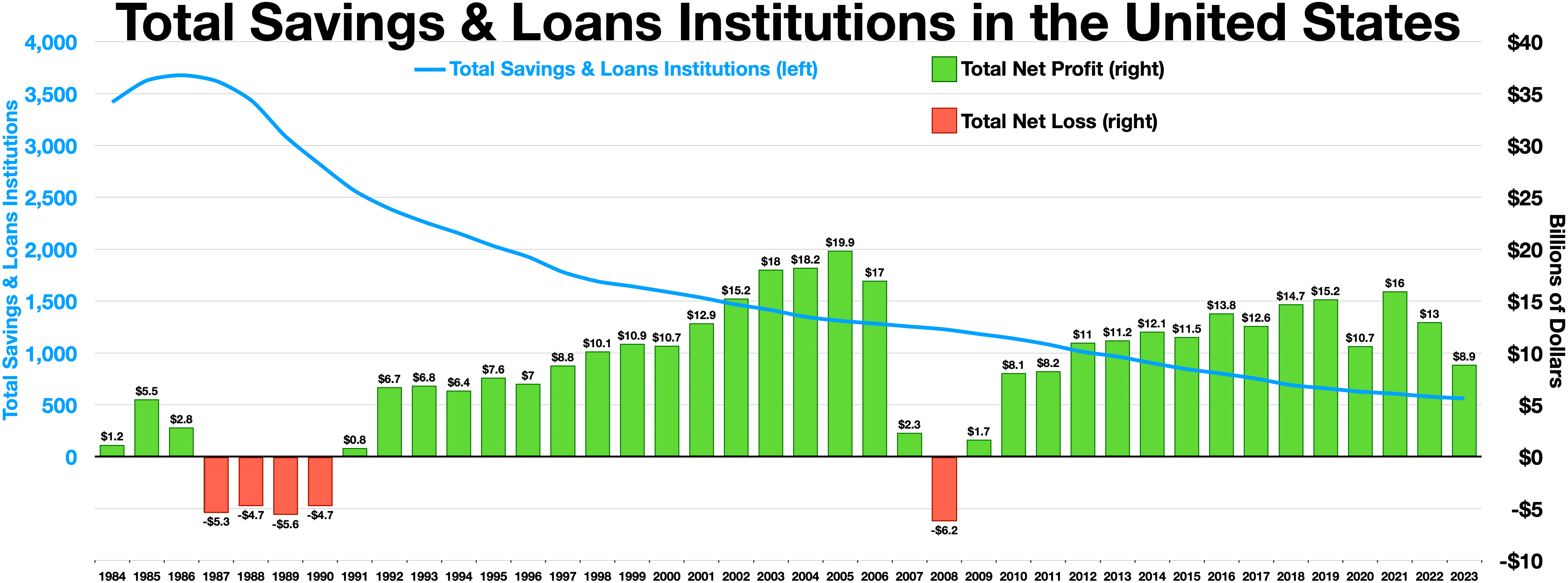
Total Savings & Loans Institutions in the United States

The savings and loan association became a strong force in the early 20th century through assisting people with home ownership, through mortgage lending, and further assisting their members with basic saving and investing outlets, typically through passbook savings accounts and term certificates of deposit.

The earliest mortgages were not offered by banks, but by insurance companies, and they differed greatly from the mortgage or home loan that is familiar today. Most early mortgages were short term with some kind of balloon payment at the end of the term, or they were interest-only loans which did not pay anything toward the principal of the loan with each payment. As such, many people were either perpetually in debt in a continuous cycle of refinancing their home purchase, or they lost their home through foreclosure when they were unable to make the balloon payment at the end of the term of that loan.

The US Congress passed the Federal Home Loan Bank Act in 1932, during the Great Depression. It established the Federal Home Loan Bank and associated Federal Home Loan Bank Board to assist other banks in providing funding to offer long term, amortized loans for home purchases. The idea was to get banks involved in lending, not insurance companies, and to provide realistic loans which people could repay and gain full ownership of their homes.

Savings and loan associations sprang up all across the United States because there was low-cost funding available through the Federal Home Loan Bank for the purposes of mortgage lending.

== New Deal-era reforms ==
During the 1930s, the U.S. and the rest of the world experienced a severe economic contraction that is now called the Great Depression. In the U.S. during the height of the Great Depression, the official unemployment rate was 25% and the stock market had declined 75% since 1929. Bank runs were common because there wasn't insurance on deposits at banks, banks kept only a fraction of deposits in reserve, and customers ran the risk of losing the money that they had deposited if their bank failed.

By the beginning of 1933, the banking system in the United States had effectively ceased to function. The incoming Roosevelt administration and the incoming Congress took immediate steps to pass legislation to respond to the Great Depression. Roosevelt entered office with enormous political capital. Americans of all political persuasions were demanding immediate action, and Roosevelt responded with a remarkable series of new programs in the "first hundred days" of the administration, in which he met with Congress for 100 days. During those 100 days of lawmaking, Congress granted every request Roosevelt asked, and passed a few programs (such as the FDIC to insure bank accounts) that he opposed.

A major component of Roosevelt's New Deal of economic, social, and political reforms was reform of the nation's banking system. With strident language Roosevelt took credit for dethroning the bankers he alleged had caused the debacle. On March 4, 1933, in his first inaugural address, he proclaimed:

Practices of the unscrupulous money changers stand indicted in the court of public opinion, rejected by the hearts and minds of men. ... The money changers have fled from their high seats in the temple of our civilization.

=== Emergency Banking Act ===
Roosevelt closed all the banks in the country and kept them shut until he could pass new legislation. On March 9, Roosevelt sent to Congress the Emergency Banking Act, drafted in large part by Hoover's top advisors. The act was passed and signed into law the same day. It provided for a system of reopening sound banks under Treasury supervision, with federal loans available if needed. Three-quarters of the banks in the Federal Reserve System reopened within the next three days. Billions of dollars in hoarded currency and gold flowed back into them within a month, thus stabilizing the banking system. By the end of 1933, 4,004 small local banks were permanently closed and merged into larger banks. (Their depositors eventually received on average 86 cents on the dollar of their deposits; it is a common myth that they received nothing back.)

=== Creation of the FDIC and FSLIC ===
In June 1933, over Roosevelt's objections, Congress created the Federal Deposit Insurance Corporation (FDIC), which insured deposits for up to $2,500 beginning January 1, 1934. On June 16, 1933, President Roosevelt signed the Banking Act of 1933. This legislation:

- Established the FDIC as a temporary government corporation
- Gave the FDIC authority to provide deposit insurance to banks
- Gave the FDIC the authority to regulate and supervise state nonmember banks
- Funded the FDIC with initial loans of $289 million through the U.S. Treasury and the Federal Reserve
- Extended federal oversight to all commercial banks for the first time
- Separated commercial and investment banking (Glass–Steagall Act)
- Prohibited banks from paying interest on checking accounts
- Allowed national banks to branch statewide, if allowed by state law.

The Federal Savings and Loan Insurance Corporation (FSLIC) was created as part of the National Housing Act of 1934 in order to insure deposits in savings and loans, a year after the FDIC was created to insure deposits in commercial banks. It was administered by the Federal Home Loan Bank Board(FHLBB).

=== Abandonment of the gold standard ===
To deal with deflation, the nation went off the gold standard. In March and April in a series of laws and executive orders, the government suspended the gold standard for United States currency. Anyone holding significant amounts of gold coinage was mandated to exchange it for the existing fixed price of US dollars, after which the US would no longer pay gold on demand for the dollar, and gold would no longer be considered valid legal tender for debts in private and public contracts. The dollar was allowed to float freely on foreign exchange markets with no guaranteed price in gold, only to be fixed again at a significantly lower level a year later with the passage of the Gold Reserve Act in 1934. Markets immediately responded well to the suspension, in the hope that the decline in prices would finally end.

=== Glass-Steagall Act of 1933 ===
The Glass–Steagall Act of 1933 was passed in reaction to the collapse of a large portion of the American commercial banking system in early 1933. One of its provisions introduced the separation of bank types according to their business (commercial and investment banking). In order to comply with the new regulation, most large banks split into separate entities. For example, JP Morgan split into three entities: JP Morgan continued to operate as a commercial bank, Morgan Stanley was formed to operate as an investment bank, and Morgan Grenfell operated as a British merchant bank.

=== Banking Act of 1935 ===
The Banking Act of 1935 strengthened the powers of the Federal Reserve Board of Governors in the area of credit management, tightened existing restrictions on banks engaging in certain activities, and enlarged the supervisory powers of the FDIC.

== Bretton Woods system ==
The 1944 Bretton Woods Agreement set up the Bretton Woods system of monetary management, establishing the rules for commercial and financial relations among the world's major industrial states in the mid 20th century. The Agreement also included institutions and procedures to regulate the international monetary system, creating the first example of a fully negotiated monetary order intended to govern monetary relations among independent nation-states.

Among these institutions were the International Monetary Fund (IMF) and the International Bank for Reconstruction and Development (IBRD), which today is part of the World Bank Group. The chief features of the Bretton Woods system were an obligation for each country to adopt a monetary policy that maintained the exchange rate by tying its currency to the U.S. dollar and the ability of the IMF to bridge temporary international imbalances of payments. Eurodollars grew with imports as the US had become the largest consumer market after World War II.

== Automated teller machines ==
On September 2, 1969, Chemical Bank installed the first ATM in the U.S. at its branch in Rockville Centre, New York. The first ATMs were designed to dispense a fixed amount of cash when a user inserted a specially coded card. A Chemical Bank advertisement boasted "On Sept. 2 our bank will open at 9:00 and never close again." Chemical executives were initially hesitant about the electronic banking transition given the high cost of the early machines. Additionally, executives were concerned that customers would resist having machines handling their money.

== Nixon shock ==
In 1971, in response persistent inflation, falling value of the dollar, and a drain on Federal government gold reserves that threatened to leave the U.S. dollar not fully-backed, President Richard Nixon took a series of economic measures that included wage and price freezes, surcharges on imports, and unilaterally cancelling the direct convertibility of the dollar to gold that essentially ended the existing Bretton Woods system of international financial exchange. Collectively, these are known as the Nixon shock.

== Deregulation of the 1980s and 1990s ==
Liberalizing legislation passed by the federal government during the 1980s, such as the Depository Institutions Deregulation and Monetary Control Act of 1980 and the Garn–St. Germain Depository Institutions Act of 1982, diminished the distinctions between banks and other financial institutions in the United States. This legislation is frequently referred to as "deregulation", and it is often blamed for the failure of over 500 savings and loan associations between 1980 and 1988, and the subsequent failure of the Federal Savings and Loan Insurance Corporation (FSLIC) whose obligations were assumed by the Federal Deposit Insurance Corporation (FDIC) in 1989. However, some critics of this viewpoint, particularly libertarians, have pointed out that the laws extended moral hazard by granting easy credit to federally insured financial institutions, encouraging them to overextend themselves and (thus) fail.

=== Savings and loan crisis ===
The savings and loan crisis of the 1980s and 1990s was the failure of 747 out of the 3,234 savings and loan associations in the United States. "As of December 31, 1995, RTC estimated that the total cost for resolving the 747 failed institutions was $87.9 billion." The remainder of the bailout was paid for by charges on savings and loan accounts—which contributed to the large budget deficits of the early 1990s.

The concomitant slowdown in the finance industry and the real estate market may have been a contributing cause of the 1990–1991 economic recession. Between 1986 and 1991, the number of new homes constructed per year dropped from 1.8 million to 1 million, which was at the time the lowest rate since World War II.

=== Expansion of FDIC insurance - 1989 ===
Until 1989, banks with national charters (national banks) were required to participate in the FDIC, while state banks either were required to obtain FDIC insurance by state law or they could voluntarily join it (usually in an attempt to bolster their appearance of solvency). After enactment of the Federal Deposit Insurance Corporation Improvement Act of 1989 ("FDICIA"), all commercial banks that accepted deposits were required to obtain FDIC insurance and to have a primary federal regulator (the Federal Reserve System for participating state banks, the FDIC for "nonmember" state banks, and the Federal government Office of the Comptroller of the Currency for all National Banks).

Note: Federal Credit Unions are regulated by National Credit Union Administration (NCUA). Savings & Loan Associations (S&L) and Federal Savings Banks (FSB) are regulated by the Office of Thrift Supervision (OTS)

=== Repeal of interstate banking prohibition ===
Ever since the National Bank Act of 1863, federally-chartered banks were effectively prohibited from interstate banking. This prohibition was further enshrined in the McFadden Act of 1927. The restriction on interstate banking prevented banks from achieving geographic diversification, making them especially vulnerable to local economic disruptions. Changes in technology (including improved electronic communications, digital banking, and the Internet), banking practices, and consumer mobility all argued in favor of modifying the limitation. The Riegle-Neal Interstate Banking and Branching Efficiency Act of 1994 repealed this prohibition.

=== Partial repeal of the Glass-Steagall Act ===
The Glass-Steagall Act of 1933 prohibited a bank holding company from owning other financial institutions. Applicable provisions were repealed on November 12, 1999, by the Gramm–Leach–Bliley Act, which effectively removed the separation that previously existed between Wall Street investment banks and depository banks. Some argue that this repeal directly contributed to the severity of the 2008 financial crisis.

== 2008 financial crisis ==
The 2008 financial crisis is considered by many economists to be the worst financial crisis since the Great Depression of the 1930s. It was triggered by a liquidity shortfall in the United States banking system and resulted in the collapse of large financial institutions, the bailout of banks by national governments, and downturns in stock markets around the world. In many areas, the housing market has also suffered, resulting in numerous evictions, foreclosures and prolonged vacancies. It contributed to the failure of key businesses, declines in consumer wealth estimated in the trillions of U.S. dollars, and a significant decline in economic activity, leading to a severe global economic recession in 2008.

The collapse of the U.S. housing bubble, which peaked in 2006, caused the values of securities tied to U.S. real estate pricing to plummet, damaging financial institutions globally. Questions regarding bank solvency, declines in credit availability and damaged investor confidence affected global stock markets, where securities suffered large losses during 2008 and early 2009. Economies worldwide slowed during this period, as credit tightened and international trade declined. Critics argued that credit rating agencies and investors failed to accurately price the risk involved with mortgage-related financial products, and that governments did not adjust their regulatory practices to address 21st-century financial markets. Governments and central banks responded with unprecedented fiscal stimulus, monetary policy expansion and institutional bailouts.

There is some debate as to what role the repeal of Glass–Steagall had on the 2008 financial crisis.

Although there have been aftershocks, the 2008 financial crisis ended sometime between late 2008 and mid-2009. While many causes for the financial crisis have been suggested, with varying weight assigned by experts, the United States Senate issuing the Levin–Coburn Report found "that the crisis was not a natural disaster, but the result of high risk, complex financial products; undisclosed conflicts of interest; and the failure of regulators, the credit rating agencies, and the market itself to rein in the excesses of Wall Street."

Both market-based and regulatory solutions have been implemented or are under consideration.

=== Expansion of FDIC insurance - 2008-2010 ===
Due to the 2008 financial crisis, and to encourage businesses and high-net-worth individuals to keep their cash in the largest banks (rather than spreading it out), Congress temporarily increased the insurance limit to $250,000. With the passage of the Dodd-Frank Wall Street Reform and Consumer Protection Act, this increase became permanent as of July 21, 2010.

=== Dodd–Frank Act ===
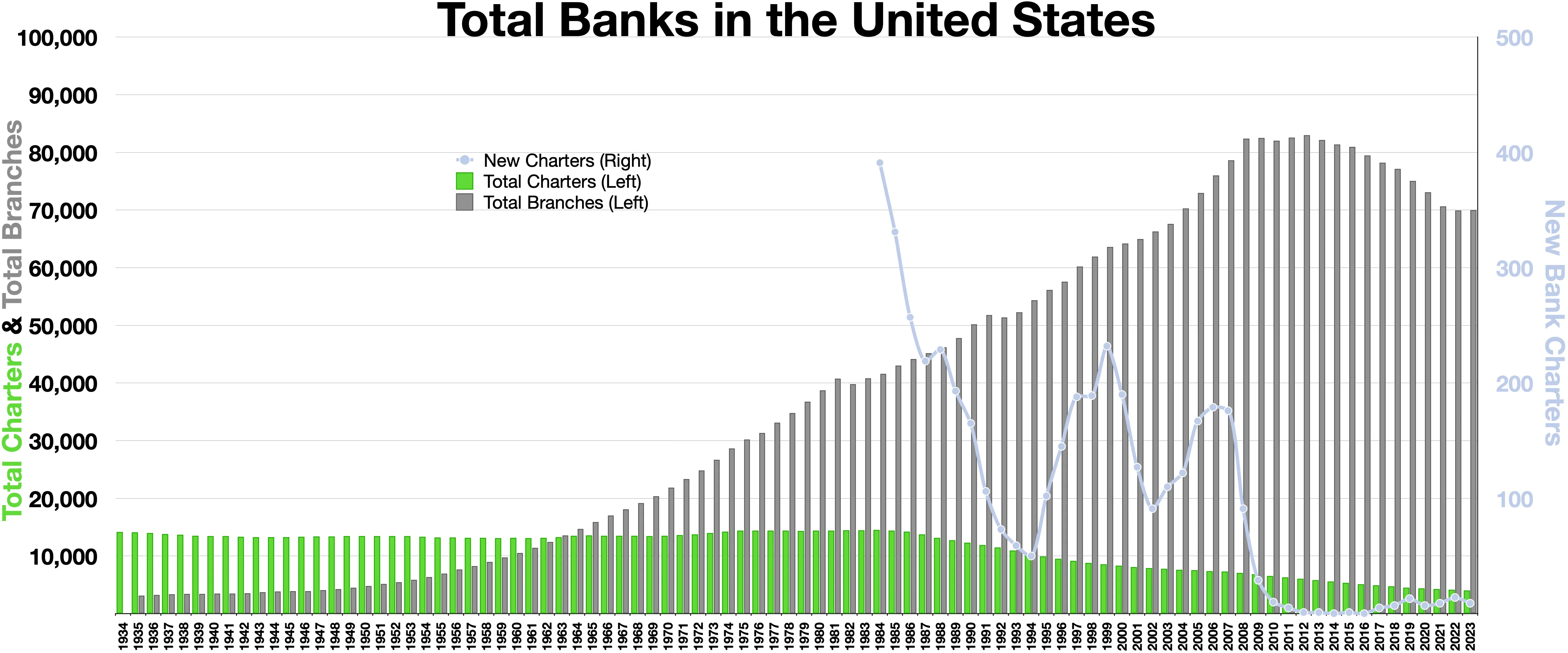
Total banks in the United States New chartered banks (right) Total Charters (left) Total branches (left)

The Dodd–Frank Wall Street Reform and Consumer Protection Act is the most sweeping change to financial regulation in the United States since the Great Depression, and represents a significant change in the American financial regulatory environment affecting all Federal financial regulatory agencies and affecting almost every aspect of the nation's financial services industry.

The main part of the bill reinstated distinctions between banks and hedge funds and limited banks scope into them. It also formed the Consumer Financial Protection Bureau and Financial Services Oversight Council to monitor market conditions and gave the FDIC power to seize troubled banks deemed "too big to fail." According to the Volcker Rule, Banks were also banned from investing for their own personal profit.

In 2018, President Donald Trump signed into law the Economic Growth, Regulatory Relief, and Consumer Protection Act which made some mild reforms to the Dodd-Frank Act. It raised the minimum amount of assets banks need to be subject of more Federal oversight from $50B to $250B, though gave power to the Fed to force them if necessary. The act also eliminated the Volcker Rule for banks with fewer than $10B in assets.

== COVID-19 pandemic ==
On March 16, 2020, amid an economic crisis caused by the COVID-19 pandemic, for the first time since the inception of the Federal Reserve, the fractional reserve requirement was reduced to 0%.

== See also ==
- American business history
- Causes of the Great Depression
- Great Contraction
- History of banking
- History of banking in China
- History of banking in Hong Kong
- History of banking in Italy
- History of banking in Malta
- History of banking in the United Kingdom
- History of investment banking in the United States
