= History of banking in Hong Kong =

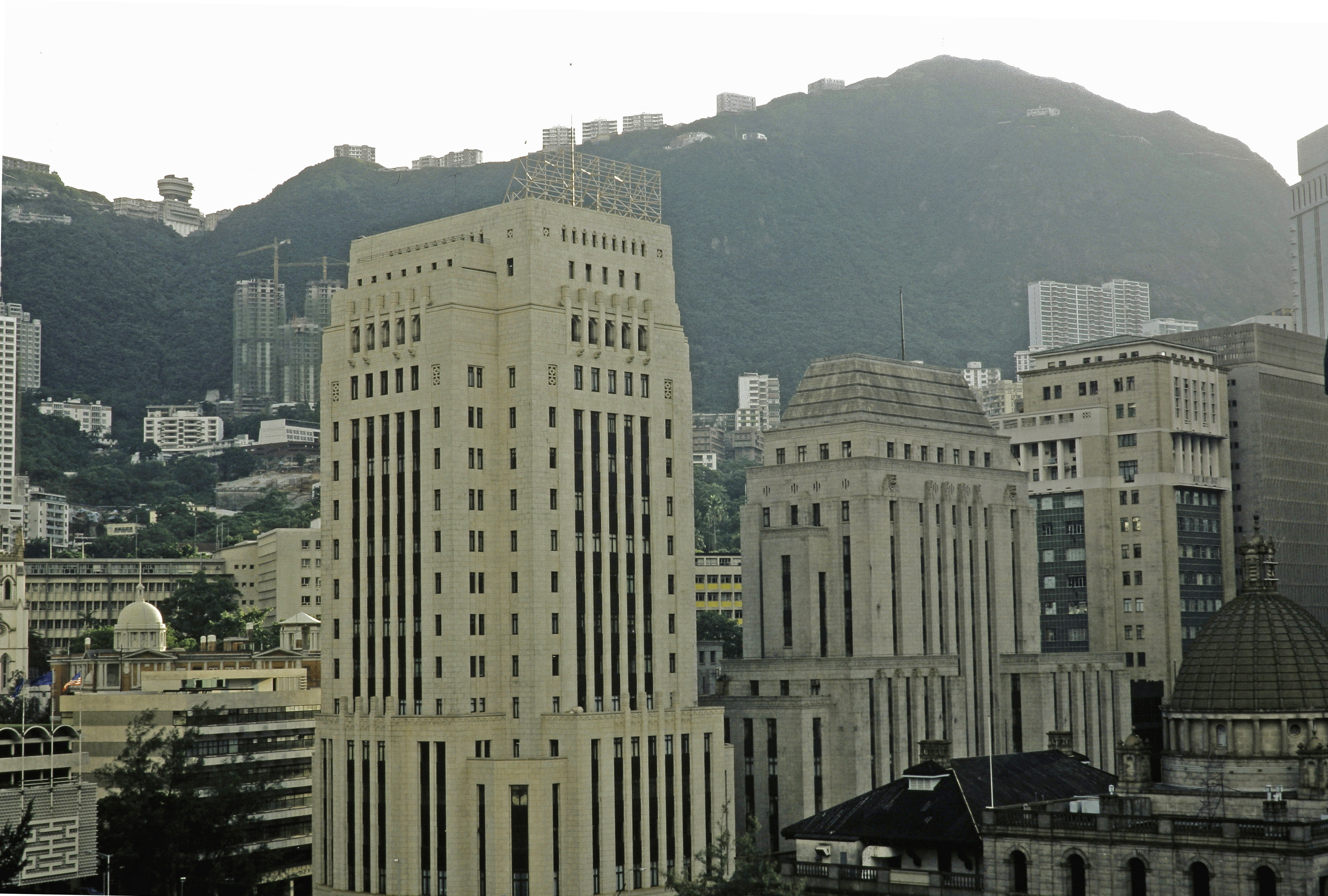
Hong Kong 1980 BoC HSBC

The history of banking in Hong Kong refers to the chronological account and development of financial institutions in the region from its early days to the present.

== 19th century ==
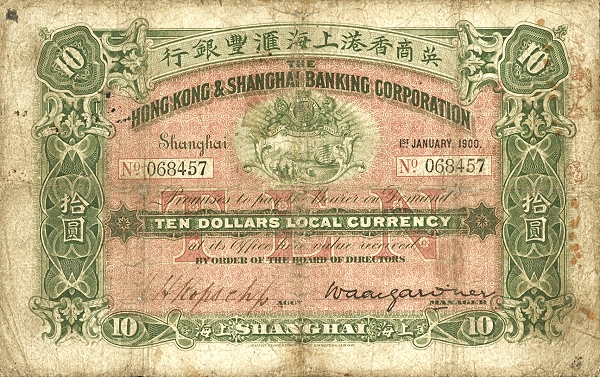
10 Dollars - Hongkong & Shanghai Banking Corporation

=== British colonial influence ===
After the establishment of Hong Kong as a British colony in 1842, the territory witnessed the foundation of its modern banking system. The Hongkong and Shanghai Banking Corporation (HSBC) was established in 1865, with the primary purpose of financing trade between China and Europe.

=== Growth of local banking ===
By the latter part of the 19th century, apart from international banks, there was a significant emergence of local Chinese banks. These banks primarily served the financial needs of the local population and played a pivotal role in nurturing the domestic economy.

== Early 20th century ==
=== Economic volatility ===
The early decades of the 20th century were marked by economic uncertainties worldwide, which also influenced Hong Kong's trade-dependent banking landscape. The Great Depression, in particular, had a significant impact on banking operations and trade finance. Throughout the early 20th century, Hong Kong faced various financial pressures, not just from global events like the Great Depression, but also due to regional disruptions caused by events such as the Chinese Civil War. These challenges required banks in Hong Kong to adopt adaptable business models and strategies, ensuring their survival.

=== Development of regulatory framework ===
New rules and regulations were introduced by Hong Kong authorities to oversee banking operations. By the mid-20th century, initiatives were introduced to supervise lending practices, manage risks, and ensure the overall soundness of the financial institutions operating in the territory. Among the new measures were deposit insurance schemes, periodic financial health checks for banks, and stricter audit requirements.

== Post-war era ==
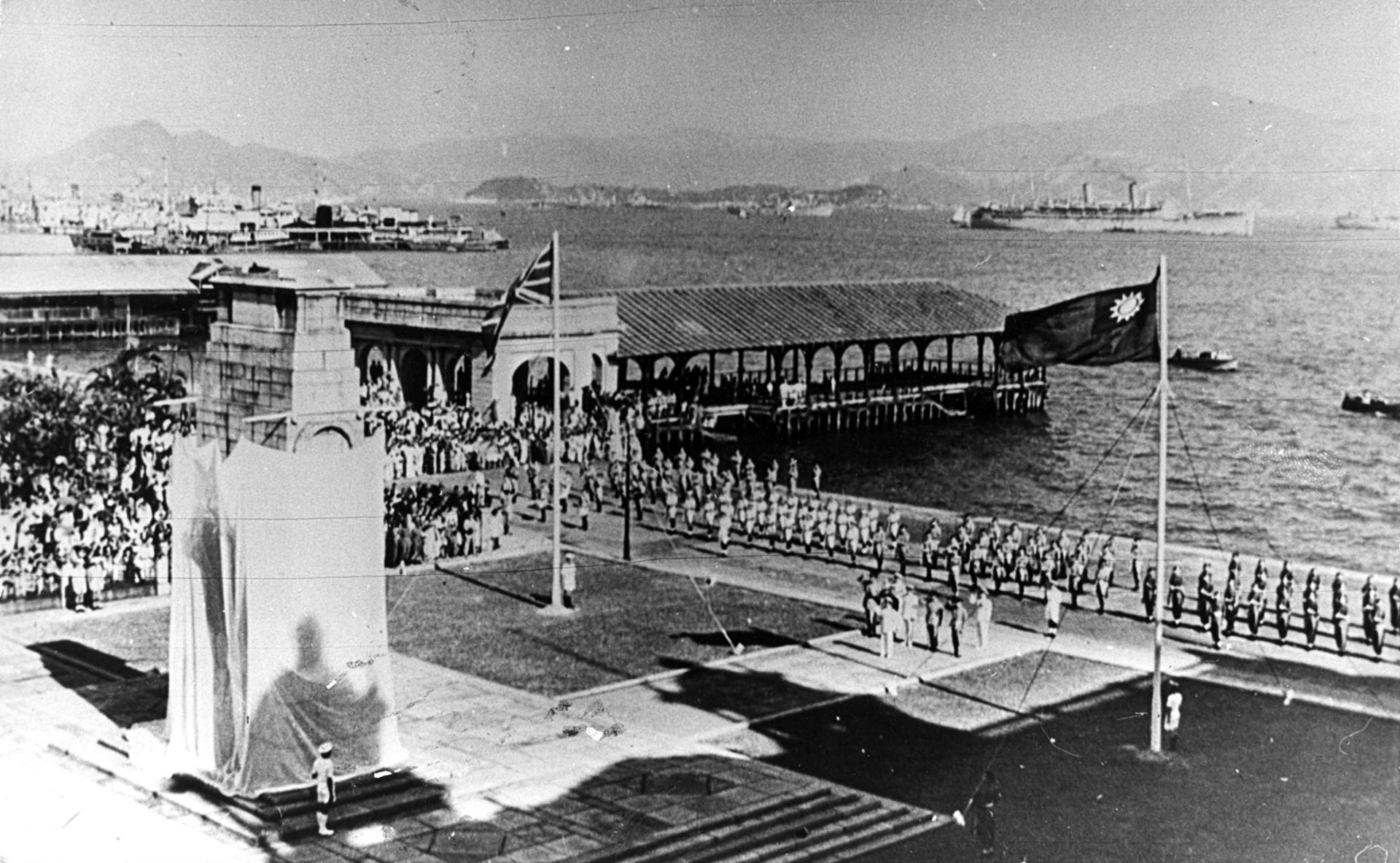
1945 liberation of Hong Kong at Cenotaph

=== Post-war recovery ===
Following World War II, Hong Kong's banking sector played a central role in the region's post-war recovery, financing reconstruction and trade. In the wake of World War II, Hong Kong faced the massive task of rebuilding its infrastructure and economy. The banking sector was pivotal in this recovery phase, offering loans for reconstruction efforts and promoting trade activities, thereby setting the stage for Hong Kong's subsequent growth.

=== Emergence as a financial hub ===
By the 1970s, with the rise of global finance, Hong Kong began to incorporate into the global economy as one of the world's leading financial centers. This era saw the introduction of more foreign banks and the expansion of existing local banks. The banking industry capitalized on this momentum, positioning itself to service global corporations, investors, and facilitating capital flow across borders and numerous jurisdictions.

== Late 20th century to present ==
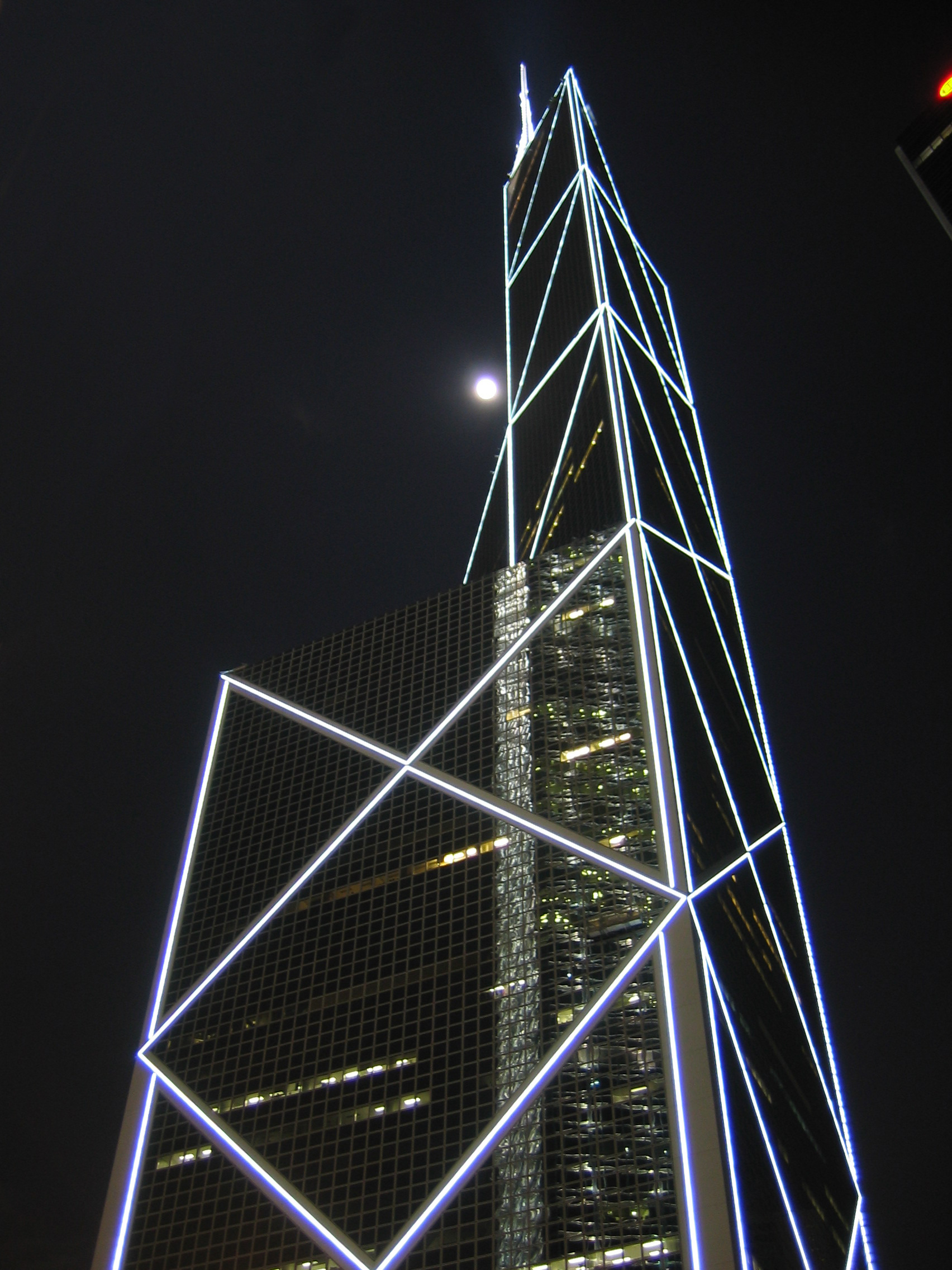
Hong Kong Bank of China

=== Banking reforms ===
With an increasing emphasis on transparency and international standards, the late 20th century witnessed a series of banking reforms aimed at strengthening Hong Kong's position in the global finance arena. Among the reforms were improved disclosure practices and capital adequacy requirements.

=== Financial crises and resilience ===
The 1997 Asian financial crisis and the 2008 financial crisis were some of the most significant recent challenges for Hong Kong's banking sector. Regulatory oversight and interventions played a significant role in stabilizing the banking sector during the global economic upheavals.

=== Digital banking and fintech ===
In the 21st century, digital banking and fintech innovations began reshaping the banking landscape in Hong Kong. Traditional banks expanded their services to include digital platforms, while new digital-only banks emerged. These developments reflected a broader trend in the banking industry's adaptation to technological advancements.

== See also ==
- Economy of Hong Kong
- History of banking in China
- History of banking in Italy
- History of banking in Malta
- History of banking in the United Kingdom
- History of banking in the United States
- List of banks in Hong Kong
- Banking Code
