= History of investment banking in the United States =

Philadelphia financier Jay Cooke established the first modern American investment bank during the Civil War era. However, private banks had been providing investment banking functions since the beginning of the 19th century and many of these evolved into investment banks in the post-bellum era. However, the evolution of firms into investment banks did not follow a single trajectory. For example, some currency brokers such as Prime, Ward & King and John E. Thayer and Brother moved from foreign exchange operations to become private banks, taking on some investment bank functions. Other investment banks evolved from mercantile firms such as Thomas Biddle and Co. and Alexander Brothers.

== Civil War ==
During the Civil War, banking houses were syndicated to meet the federal government's need for money to fund its war efforts. Jay Cooke launched the first mass securities selling operation in U.S. history employing thousands of salesmen to float what ultimately amounted to $830 million worth of government bonds to a wide group of investors. Cooke then reached out to the general public, acting as an agent of the Treasury Department, personally led a war bond drive that netted approximately $1.5 billion for Treasury. The second largest offering house was Livermore, Clews founded by Henry Clews.

== Post-Civil War era ==
The market for financial services evolved dramatically in the post-Civil War era. One of the most significant changes was the emergence of "active investment banking" in which investment bankers influenced the management of client companies through sitting on the finance committees and even directly on the board of directors of those companies.

=== Surging demand for capital ===
Lance Davis has demonstrated that the process of capital formation in the 19th century was markedly different between the British capital market and the American capital market. British industrialists were readily able to satisfy their need for capital by tapping a vast source of international capital through British banks such as Westminster's, Lloyds and Barclays. In contrast, the dramatic growth of the United States created capital requirements that far outstripped the limited capital resources of American banks. Investment banking in the United States emerged to serve the expansion of railroads, mining companies, and heavy industry. Unlike commercial banks, investment banks were not authorized to issue notes or accept deposits. Instead, they served as brokers or intermediaries, bringing together investors with capital and the firms that needed that capital.

== Late 19th century ==
From the Panic of 1873 until the first decade of the 20th century, the private investment banking industry was dominated by two distinct groups: the German-Jewish immigrant bankers and the so-called "Yankee houses". Despite this ostensible ethnic difference, the two groups shared a similar economic structure. With one exception, the Yankee houses had ties with expatriate Americans who had become merchant bankers in London. Similarly, almost all of the German-Jewish houses had ties with German-Jewish merchant bankers in London. The one exception was Kuhn, Loeb which was tied to European sources of capital through the German investment banking community.

=== Jewish investment banks ===
Jewish banking houses were instrumental to the process of capital formation in the United States in the late 19th and early 20th century. Modern banking in Europe and the United States was influenced by Jewish financiers, such as the Rothschild and Warburg families, and Jews were major contributors to the establishment of important investment banks on Wall Street.

In the middle of the 19th century, a number of German Jews founded investment banking firms which later became mainstays of the industry. Most prominent Jewish banks in the United States were investment banks, rather than commercial banks. Jonathan Knee postulates that Jews were forced to focus on the development of investment banks because they were excluded from the commercial banking sector. In many cases, the efforts of Jewish immigrants to start banks was enabled due to the substantial support of their Jewish banking connections in Europe.

Several major banks were started following the mid-19th century by Jews, including Goldman Sachs (founded by Samuel Sachs and Marcus Goldman), Kuhn Loeb (Solomon Loeb and Jacob H. Schiff), Lehman Brothers (Henry Lehman), Salomon Brothers, and Bache & Co.(founded by Jules Bache).

The firm of Kuhn, Loeb & Co. played a prominent role in the area of railway finance.

In the late 1860s, The Seligman family transitioned from merchandising to banking, setting up operations in New York, St. Louis, and Philadelphia as well as Frankfurt, Germany, London and Paris that gave European investors an opportunity to buy American government and railroad bonds. The firm's conservative policies allowed it to ride out the panic of 1873. In the 1880s the firm provided financing for French efforts to build a canal in Panama as well as the subsequent American endeavor. In the 1890s J.& W. Seligman & Co. Inc. underwrote the securities of newly formed trusts, participated in stock and bond issues in the railroad and steel and wire industries, and invested in Russia and Peru, and in American in shipbuilding, bridges, bicycles, mining, and other enterprises. In 1910 William C. Durant of the fledgling General Motors Corporation gave control of his company to the Seligmans and Lee, Higginson & Co. in return for underwriting $15 million worth of corporate notes.

Lehman Brothers entered investment banking in the 1880s, becoming a member of the Coffee Exchange as early as 1883 and finally the New York Stock Exchange in 1887. In 1899, it underwrote its first public offering, the preferred and common stock of the International Steam Pump Company. Despite the offering of International Steam, the firm's real shift from being a commodities house to a house of issue did not begin until 1906. In that year, under Philip Lehman, the firm partnered with Goldman, Sachs & Co., to bring the General Cigar Co. to market, followed closely by Sears, Roebuck and Company. During the following two decades, almost one hundred new issues were underwritten by Lehman, many times in conjunction with Goldman, Sachs. Among these were F.W. Woolworth Company, May Department Stores Company, Gimbel Brothers, Inc., R.H. Macy & Company, The Studebaker Corporation, the B.F. Goodrich Co. and Endicott Johnson Corporation.

In the 1890s, a time of severe depression, Populist politicians decried the influence of a Jewish conspiracy to control the world's gold supply at the expense of honest farmers. The fiery orator Mary E. Lease denounced President Grover Cleveland "the agent of Jewish bankers and British gold." The Populist movement almost totally collapsed after 1896, and the bitter rhetoric largely disappeared as prosperity returned.

After 1920 many banks which had their roots in the German-Jewish immigrant community began to lose their Jewish character. They no longer filled the ranks of management nor sought their capital needs from within the community. By the 1930s, Jewish presence in the private investment banking had diminished sharply.

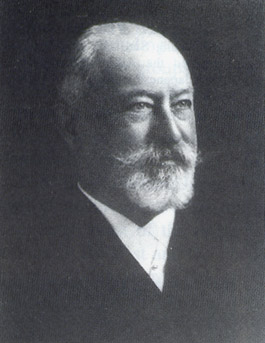
Jacob Schiff

Jacob Schiff was perhaps the most influential Jewish banker in the United States at the end of the 19th century. He was president of Kuhn Loeb and financed railroads such as the Pennsylvania Railroad and the Louisville and Nashville Railroad, and he took part in the reorganization of the Baltimore & Ohio Railroad in 1896–99, and at various times aided the Westinghouse Electric Company, and the Western Union Telegraph Company.

=== The "Yankee houses" ===
The history of the "Yankee houses" can be traced to the decision of Junius Spencer Morgan to become a partner at George Peabody & Company in London. When Peabody retired in 1864, Morgan became the senior partner and the firm was renamed "J.S. Morgan & Company". Junius' son, John Pierpont Morgan entered the business and ultimately became a partner at what was to become Drexel, Morgan & Co., the most important investment bank in American history. By 1900, J.P. Morgan was the most important investment banker in the United States and "the dominant figure in all the Drexel banks." The Morgan interests were involved in many of the largest investment actions of the 1890s-1910s. The Morgan partners used their large social networks to create an ethos of expertise. They worked together to develop access to information and resources outside the firm. They fostered a culture of exclusivity that signaled the firm's very high standing and its ties relative to their competitors or other elite bankers.

== Early 20th century ==
During the period from 1890 to 1925, the investment banking industry was highly concentrated and dominated by an oligopoly that consisted of JP Morgan & Co.; Kuhn, Loeb & Co.; Brown Bros. & Co.; and Kidder, Peabody & Co. There was no legal requirement to separate the operations of commercial and investment banks; as a result deposits from the commercial banking side of the business constituted an in-house supply of capital that could be used to fund the underwriting business of the investment banking side.

=== The Panic of 1907 and the Pujo Committee ===
The Panic of 1907 caught Wall Street unaware, with the growing crisis that threatened to bring down important banks. Brunner and Carr argue it was a "perfect storm" that combined information asymmetry, excess complexity of the financial system, a lack of financial shock absorbers, confused leadership, and a lack of capital relative to demand following a period of economic growth. During a period of two weeks in October and November 1907, John Pierpont Morgan acted as a "one-man Federal Reserve Bank," along with James Stillman, president of the National City Bank. They brought together the major players, agreed on a rescue plan, and obtained presidential approval for it, put it in place, And ended the panic. The crisis convinced the political leadership, and the financial leadership, that drastic reforms were necessary. The long-term result was the Federal Reserve System, established in 1913.

In 1913 the Pujo Committee, investigated the relationships in investment banking. Under the leadership of Attorney Samuel Untermyer, the committee decided that a small cabal of financiers had gained consolidated control of numerous industries through the abuse of the public trust in the United States. The chair of the House Committee on Banking and Currency, Representative Arsène Pujo, (D–La. 7th) headed a special committee to investigate a "money trust". The committee issued a scathing report on the banking trade, and found that the officers of J.P. Morgan & Co. also sat on the boards of directors of 112 corporations with a market capitalization of $22.5 billion (the total capitalization of the New York Stock Exchange was then estimated at $26.5 billion). The Pujo Report singled out individual bankers including Paul Warburg, Jacob H. Schiff, Felix M. Warburg, Frank E. Peabody, William Rockefeller and Benjamin Strong, Jr. The report identified over $22 billion in resources and capitalization controlled through 341 directorships held in 112 corporations by members of the empire headed by J.P. Morgan.

== New Deal-era reforms ==
By March 1933, the banking system in the United States had effectively ceased to function. The incoming Roosevelt administration and the incoming Congress took immediate steps to pass legislation to respond to the Great Depression. A major component of Roosevelt's New Deal was reform of the nation's banking system.

=== Glass-Steagall Act of 1933 ===
The Glass–Steagall Act of 1933 was passed in reaction to the collapse of a large portion of the American commercial banking system in early 1933. One of its provisions introduced the separation of bank types according to their business (commercial and investment banking). In order to comply with the new regulation, most large banks split into separate entities. For example, JP Morgan split into three entities: JP Morgan continued to operate as a commercial bank, Morgan Stanley was formed to operate as an investment bank, and Morgan Grenfell operated as a British merchant bank.

=== Securities Act of 1933 ===
Congress enacted the Securities Act of 1933 in the aftermath of the stock market crash of 1929 and during the ensuing Great Depression. Legislated pursuant to the interstate commerce clause of the Constitution, it requires that any offer or sale of securities using the means and instrumentalities of interstate commerce be registered pursuant to the 1933 Act, unless an exemption from registration exists under the law.

The 1933 Act was the first major federal legislation to regulate the offer and sale of securities. Prior to the Act, regulation of securities was chiefly governed by state laws, commonly referred to as blue sky laws. When Congress enacted the 1933 Act, it left in place a patchwork of existing state securities laws to supplement federal laws in part because there were questions as to the constitutionality of federal legislation.

=== Securities Exchange Act of 1934 ===
The Securities Exchange Act of 1934 is a law governing the secondary trading of securities (stocks, bonds, and debentures) in the United States of America. It was a sweeping piece of legislation. The Act and related statutes form the basis of regulation of the financial markets and their participants in the United States. The 1934 Act also established the Securities and Exchange Commission (SEC), the agency primarily responsible for enforcement of United States federal securities law.

=== Chandler Act of 1938 ===
One effect of the Bankruptcy Act of 1938 was to drive investment banks out of corporate reorganizations.

== Era of the dealmakers ==
After the reforms of the New Deal era, the major Wall Street investment banks focused on dealmaking, serving as advisers to corporation on mergers and acquisitions as well as public offerings of securities.

However, as of 1984, initial public underwriting offerings did not necessarily focus on institutional investors, and Eric Dobkin of Goldman Sachs is known for shifting the focus from regional stockbrokers selling shares to individual investors. For example, Dobkin participated in the 1986 privatization of British Gas, where his methods were unconventional.

== Emergence of boutique investment banking firms ==
A boutique investment banking firm is a small financial company that only provides specialized services for specific market segments. They may specialize by industry, asset size of the client, type of banking transaction or other factors, which allows them to address a niche market segment better than larger firms can.

Boutique firms have been gaining market share since the mid-1990s by being able to outperform larger banks and since the 2008 financial crisis, they have played an important role in the investment market. The most well-known boutique investment banks include Centerview Partners, LionTree Advisors and PJT Partners.

== Transition from dealmaking to trading ==
In the 1980s, the emphasis on dealmaking shifted to a new focus on trading, Firms such as Salomon Brothers, Merrill Lynch and Drexel Burnham Lambert became prominent as investment banks earned an increasing amount of their profits from trading for their own account. Advances in computing technology enabled banks to use sophisticated mathematical-models to develop and execute trading strategies. The high frequency and large volume of trades enabled them to generate a profit by taking advantages of small changes in market conditions.

== Junk bonds and the leveraged buyout ==
In the 1980s, Michael Milken, head of the high-yield bond department at Drexel Burnham Lambert, popularized the use of high yield debt (also known as junk bonds) in corporate finance, especially in mergers and acquisitions. This new source of capital sparked an explosion in leveraged buyouts and hostile takeovers.

== Repeal of the Glass-Steagall Act ==
Provisions of the Glass-Steagall Act that prohibit a bank holding company from owning other financial companies were repealed on November 12, 1999, by the Gramm–Leach–Bliley Act. This repeal is widely credited with precipitating the 2008 financial crisis.

== Vertical integration ==
Previously, investment banks had assisted lenders in raising more lending funds and having the ability to offer longer term fixed interest rates by converting lenders' outstanding loans into bonds. For example, a mortgage lender would make a house loan, and then use the investment bank to sell bonds to fund the debt, the money from the sale of the bonds can be used to make new loans, while the lender accepts loan payments and passes the payments on to the bondholders. This process is called securitization. However, lenders have begun to securitize loans themselves, especially in the areas of mortgage loans. Because of this, and because of the fear that this will continue, many investment banks have focused on becoming lenders themselves, making loans with the goal of securitizing them. Securitized house loans may have exacerbated the subprime mortgage crisis beginning in 2007, by making risky loans less apparent to investors.

== 2008 financial crisis ==
The importance of investment banking grew during the late 20th century, because of the growing demand for investment services, technological changes, deregulation, and globalization. Investment banks were at the heart of the shadow banking system. They invented many of the financial products used, often disguising its operation. Investment banking played a major role in the 2008 financial crisis. In the aftermath, leading American investment banks were converted into bank holding companies, and brought under new regulations. One result is the recent rapid growth of alternative financial institutions, especially long-time-horizon institutional investors, sovereign wealth funds, pension funds, and other beneficiary institutions not located in New York or London.

The 2007 credit crisis proved that the business model of the investment bank no longer worked without the regulation imposed on it by Glass-Steagall. Once Robert Rubin, a former co-chairman of Goldman Sachs became part of the Clinton administration and deregulated banks, the previous conservatism of underwriting established companies and seeking long-term gains was replaced by lower standards and short-term profit. Formerly, the guidelines said that in order to take a company public, it had to be in business for a minimum of five years and it had to show profitability for three consecutive years. After deregulation, those standards were gone, but small investors did not grasp the full impact of the change.

Investment banks Bear Stearns, founded in 1923 and Lehman Brothers, over 100 years old, collapsed; Merrill Lynch was acquired by Bank of America, which remained in trouble, as did Goldman Sachs and Morgan Stanley. The 2008 financial crisis caused Goldman Sachs and Morgan Stanley to "abandon their status as investment banks" by converting themselves into "traditional bank holding companies", thereby making themselves eligible to receive billions of dollars each in emergency taxpayer-funded assistance. By making this change, referred to as a technicality, banks would be more tightly regulated. Initially, banks received part of a $700 billion Troubled Asset Relief Program (TARP) intended to stabilize the economy and thaw the frozen credit markets. Eventually, taxpayer assistance to banks reached nearly $13 trillion, most without much scrutiny, lending did not increase and credit markets remained frozen.

A number of former Goldman-Sachs top executives, such as Henry Paulson and Ed Liddy moved to high-level positions in government and oversaw the controversial taxpayer-funded bank bailout. The TARP Oversight Report released by the Congressional Oversight Panel found, however, that the bailout tended to encourage risky behavior and "corrupt[ed] the fundamental tenets of a market economy".

The TARP has all but created an expectation, if not an emerging sense of entitlement, that certain financial and non-financial institutions are simply "too-big-or-too-interconnected-to-fail" and that the government will promptly honor the implicit guarantee issued for the benefit of any such institution that suffers a reversal of fortune. This is the enduring legacy of the TARP. Unfortunately, by offering a strong safety net funded with unlimited taxpayer resources, the government has encouraged potential recipients of such largess to undertake inappropriately risky behavior secure in the conviction that all profits from their endeavors will inure to their benefit and that large losses will fall to the taxpayers. The placement of a government sanctioned thumb-on-the-scales corrupts the fundamental tenets of a market economy – the ability to prosper and the ability to fail.

— Congressional Oversight Panel, TARP Oversight Report

Under threat of a subpoena by Senator Chuck Grassley, Goldman Sachs revealed that through TARP bailout of AIG, Goldman received $12.9 billion in taxpayer aid (some through AIG), $4.3 billion of which was then paid out to 32 entities, including many overseas banks, hedge funds and pensions. The same year it received $10 billion in aid from the government, it also paid out multimillion-dollar bonuses to 603 employees and hundreds more received million-dollar bonuses. The total paid in bonuses was $4.82 billion.

Morgan Stanley received $10 billion in TARP funds and paid out $4.475 billion in bonuses. Of those, 428 people received more than a million dollars and of those, 189 received more than $2 million.

== See also ==
- History of banking
- History of banking in the United States
- History of private equity and venture capital
- History of investment
