= China Investment Bank =

China Investment Bank (Chinese: 中国投资银行) was a bank of China. It became a subsidiary of China Construction Bank in 1994. In 2018, it was absorbed by China Development Bank, with some business was received by China CITIC Bank.
