= MAPFRE Insurance =

American insurance company

Commerce Insurance (MAPFRE Insurance)
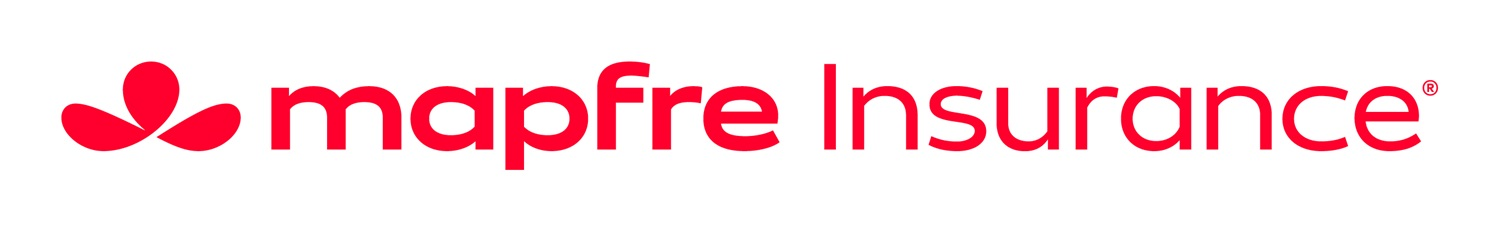
- Company type: Subsidiary
- Industry: Insurance
- Predecessor: Commerce Insurance Group
- Founded: 2008; 18 years ago
- Headquarters: Webster, Massachusetts, United States
- Area served: United States
- Key people: Jaime Tamayo (CEO)
- Products: Car insurance, general insurance, casualty insurance, Commercial property insurance
- Parent: Mapfre S.A.
- Rating: A− (AM Best)
- Website: www.mapfreinsurance.com

Commerce Insurance is an American insurance company headquartered in Webster, Massachusetts. It was founded in 1972 as the Commerce Insurance Group and was acquired in 2008 by Spanish Mapfre S.A. after which the company name was changed.

MAPFRE Insurance writes property and casualty insurance in 19 states across the United States through a network of more than 4,200 independent agents and brokers. The company provides a full range of insurance products, including coverage for automobiles, homes, motorcycles, watercraft, and businesses, as well as term life insurance in several states in the United States.

MAPFRE Insurance is a subsidiary of the Spanish multinational MAPFRE Group, an international insurer with business in 47 countries on five continents. The MAPFRE Group is a major insurer in Spain and also the non-life market in Latin America and the sixth-largest non-life insurer in Europe.

== History ==
Commerce Insurance was founded in 1972 as a small insurance company in the south-central Massachusetts town of Webster, where the company is still located and headquartered.

In April 2007, Commerce entered the New York personal lines insurance market through its acquisition of SWICO Enterprises, Ltd., the holding company for Hempstead, New York-based (link) property and casualty insurer State-Wide Insurance Company. State-Wide Insurance Company primarily writes private passenger automobile insurance in the state of New York.

In June 2008, The Commerce Group, Inc. was acquired by Mapfre S.A. Mapfre, based in Madrid, was founded in 1933 as a landowners' co-operative; it is now a public company and the largest insurance group in Latin America with a presence in 43 countries, and about 51,000 agents worldwide.

In January 2020, MAPFRE Insurance entered into an alliance with Banco Pichincha which operates in Colombia and Ecuador.

In February 2020, MAPFRE Insurance was involved in several claim cases due to Hurricane Maria in Puerto Rico.

In March 2020, MAPFRE Insurance's One Winthrop Sq. was acquired by Nan Fung Life Sciences Real Estate.
