= Joseph F.X. Zahra =

Maltese economist

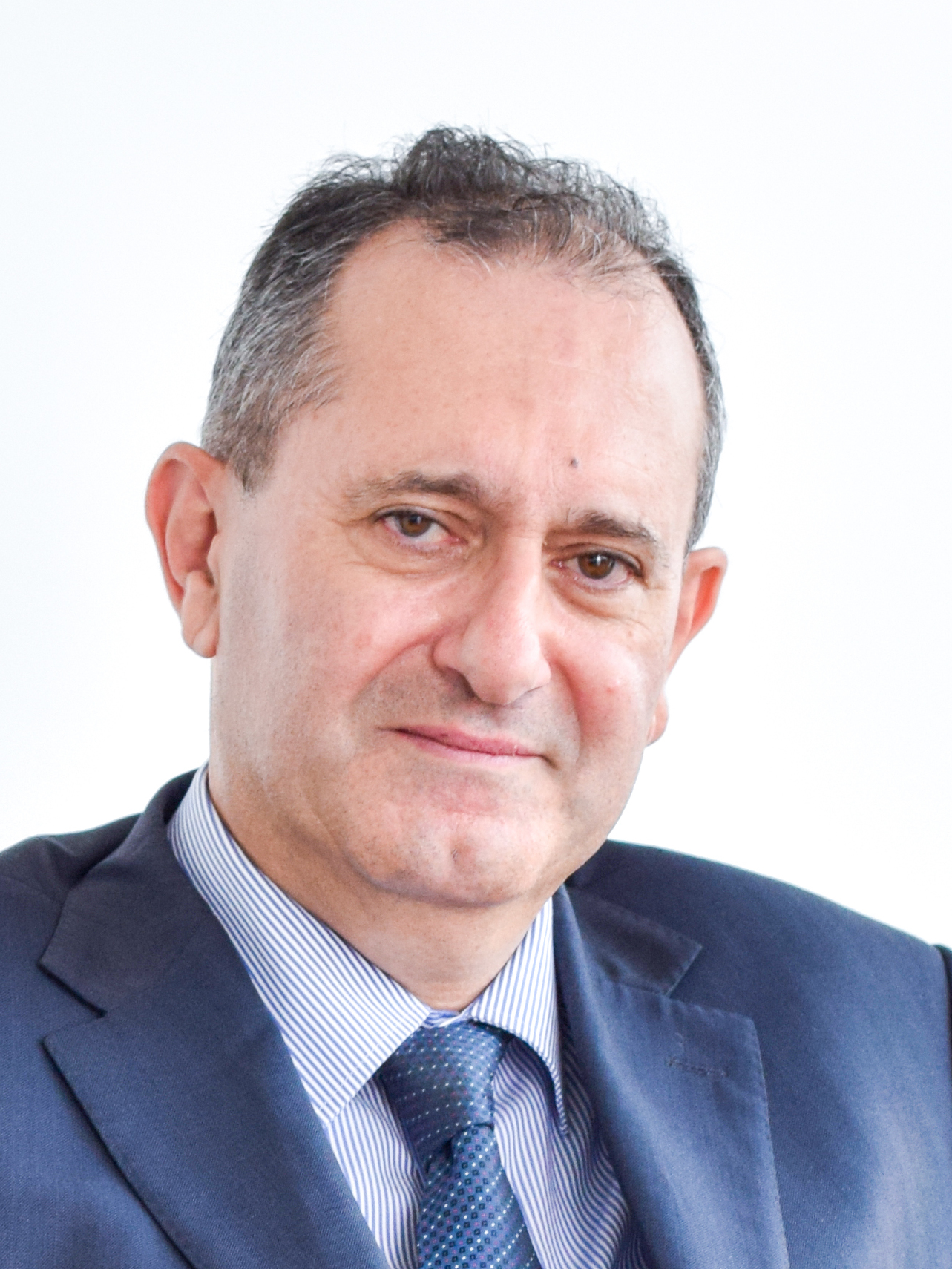
- Born: December 3, 1955 (age 70)
- Citizenship: Malta
- Education: University of Malta
- Occupation: Economist

Joseph F.X. Zahra (born December 3, 1955) is a Maltese economist. He has held a number of directorships in both private and public companies in Malta and abroad. He is a former director of the Central Bank of Malta and former chairman of Bank of Valletta plc, Maltacom plc and Middlesea Insurance plc. He is married with two children.

== Biography ==
=== Economy ===
Zahra graduated in economics from University of Malta (B.A. 1976, M.A. 1979). Zahra is a fellow member of the Salzburg Seminar on “Technology and Structural Unemployment” (1986). In 2001 he was granted Honorary Lifelong Membership in the Malta Institute of Management.

In 1983 Zahra co-founded Misco, a business advisory company, of which he became managing director.

The early 90s in Malta were times of change and restructuring for many companies and government authorities in preparation for membership in the European Union. Zahra's abilities in research, analysis, human resources and business consultancy were widely sought after to help ease this transition. From 2005 to 2008, Zahra was chairperson of the National Euro Changeover Committee which introduced the euro in Malta.

Zahra is a founding partner and managing director of SurgeAdvisory Limited, a corporate consultancy. He is a member of the audit committee of Birks Group Inc. (jewellery), United Finance plc and Pendergardens plc. Zahra is director and former chairman at Mapfre Middlesea Insurance plc, United Finance plc, Curmi & Partners Limited, Pendergardens Development plc and Vodafone Insurance plc.

His past directorships include Corinthia Hotels International Ltd (2005-2007), Central Bank of Malta (1992-1996), MSV Insurance plc (1998-2014) and Malta Development Corporation (1995-1996).

Zahra is a former chairman of Bank of Valletta (1998-2004), Mediterranean Bank Network (1999), Maltacom plc (2003), Malta Council for Culture and Arts (2002-2003), and National Higher Education Commission (2006-2008). He was appointed by then Prime Minister of Malta Lawrence Gonzi to chair the National Euro Changeover Committee to introduce the Euro currency in Malta. He was a lecturer of economics at the University of Malta and at the University of Messina.

=== Visual Arts & Literature ===
Zahra is also a playwright and the author of a book of verse. In 1973 he published his first book of verse entitled “Jien”. Two of his plays were produced at the University of Malta theatres in the 1970s. He is a keen follower of visual arts in Malta having held Chairmanship of the first Malta Council for Culture and the Arts in 2002, and a member of the Committee for the Guarantee of Maltese Heritage and Arts in the same year. In 2006, the Malta Society for Manufacturers and the Arts granted Zahra the Gold Medal Award for outstanding achievement in business and the arts.

==== Consultancy ====
Zahra is one of the five members on the International Audit Committee of the Holy See and the Vatican State. In July 2013, Pope Francis named Zahra the President of the new Pontifical Commission for Reference on the Economic-Administrative Structure of the Holy See (COSEA), chartered to investigate current accounting practices among Vatican offices and bodies and to help devise new strategies for greater fiscal responsibility and transparency. Zahra is also a board member of the Vatican-based Centesimus Annus Pro Pontifice Foundation.

As president of COSEA, Zahra presented a report with a list of recommendations on ways to make the Vatican and its actions more transparent, simplified and more efficient. In 2015, two former members of the commission were arrested on suspicion of having leaked highly confidential documents. The publication of two books featuring the leaked documents created a barrage of negative publicity for these reforms which continued nonetheless as requested by Pope Francis Zahra and the roles he occupied with previous organisations was mentioned in the publications and news articles. In February 2015 Zahra was appointed as vice-coordinator of the Vatican's Council for the Economy, headed by Cardinal Reinhard Marx.

In his latest interview given to the Malta Chamber of Commerce, as part of their Malta CEO 2019 profile complication, Zahra advocates for a CEO's position to be held for not more than 6 years. He believes that the crucial elements of a CEO are leadership skills, vision and empowering others. He considers this role as pivotal for any company to move forward and face constant challenges and change.

== Publications ==
- Zahra J.F.X., Towards Reforming the International Financial and Monetary System, Pontificial Council for Justice and Peace DISCERN, 2012, P. 8-19.
- Zahra J.F.X., Portraying Giorgio Borg Olivier's Political and Economic Vision - Still a Modern Foresight in Today's Economic Reality Address by Joseph F.X. Zahra, PN Press, 2009.
- Zahra J.F.X., The Sustainability of Malta's Social Security System: A glimpse at Malta's Welfare State and Suggestions for a Revised Change of Policy, The Today Public Policy Institute, 2009.
- Zahra J.F.X., Lessons from the Asian crisis: Turning uncertainty into Market Advantage. Globalisation policies, strategies & partnerships, Commonwealth Business Forum, Edited Papers, Commonwealth Business Council, 2000.
