= Andrew Bates =

Andrew Bates may refer to:

- Andrew J. Bates (Andrew Jackson Bates, 1839–1915), American industrialist and the founder of the Bates Shoe Company
- Andrew Bates (spokesman) (Andrew James Bates, born 1987), American political appointee
- Andrew Bates (game designer), game designer, illustrator, and author
