= Smith's Building =

- U.S. National Register of Historic Places
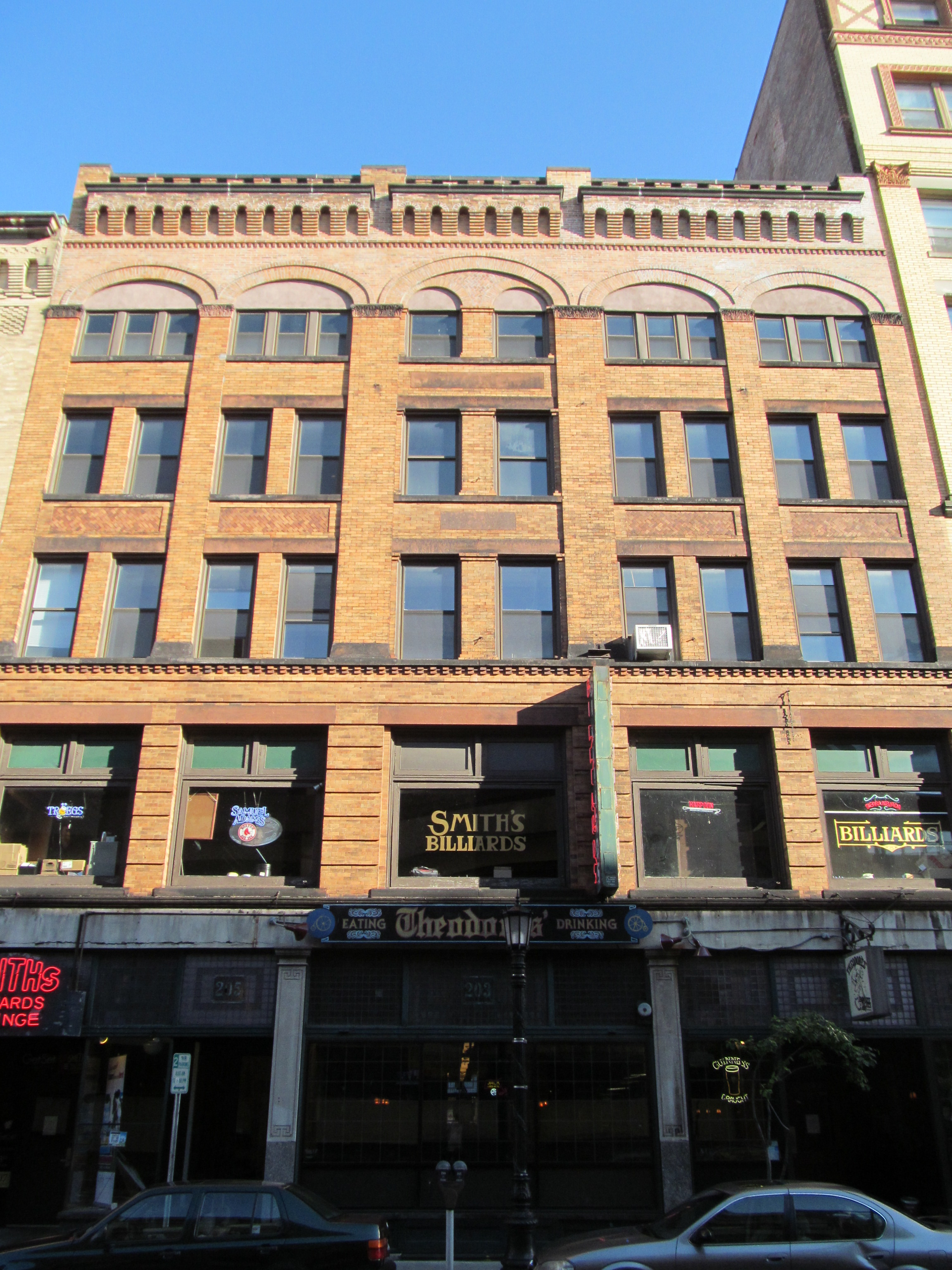
- Smith's Building

- Location within Massachusetts Location within the United States
- Location: Springfield, Massachusetts
- Coordinates: 42°6′14″N 72°35′34″W
- Built: 1897
- Architectural style: Romanesque
- MPS: Downtown Springfield MRA
- NRHP reference No.: 83000764
- Added to NRHP: February 24, 1983

Smith's Building is a historic commercial building at 201-207 Worthington Street in downtown Springfield, Massachusetts. The five-story building was built in 1897, and first occupied by the McIntosh Corporation, a major area shoe manufacturer. McIntosh occupied the premises until 1913, when it moved into a new building at Chestnut and Worthington. The next major tenant was Fred Smith, who moved his recreation center business there.

Fred Smith began his billiard and bowling business on an adjacent block in 1903. He acquired a number of billiard tables from the 1904 St. Louis Exposition, and installed them on the second floor of this building. On the upper floors he installed a bowling alley, with seven lanes of candlepins on each of the third and fourth floors, and eight on the fifth. The lanes were removed due to declining popularity and moved to a bowling alley in Connecticut. The pool hall is still in business.

The building is five-story brick construction. The ground floor has glass storefronts. The second floor-facade is shown as a mezzanine level, with five windows separated by brick piers. The upper three floor fronts are divided into five bays, each with two windows, separated by piers and topped by a decorative arch. The facade is topped by a corbelled cornice and pierced parapet.

The building was listed on the National Register of Historic Places in 1983.

== See also ==
- National Register of Historic Places listings in Springfield, Massachusetts
- National Register of Historic Places listings in Hampden County, Massachusetts
