= St. Joseph Parish, Webster =

Coordinates: 42°3′1.35″N 71°52′26.85″W

St. Joseph Parish
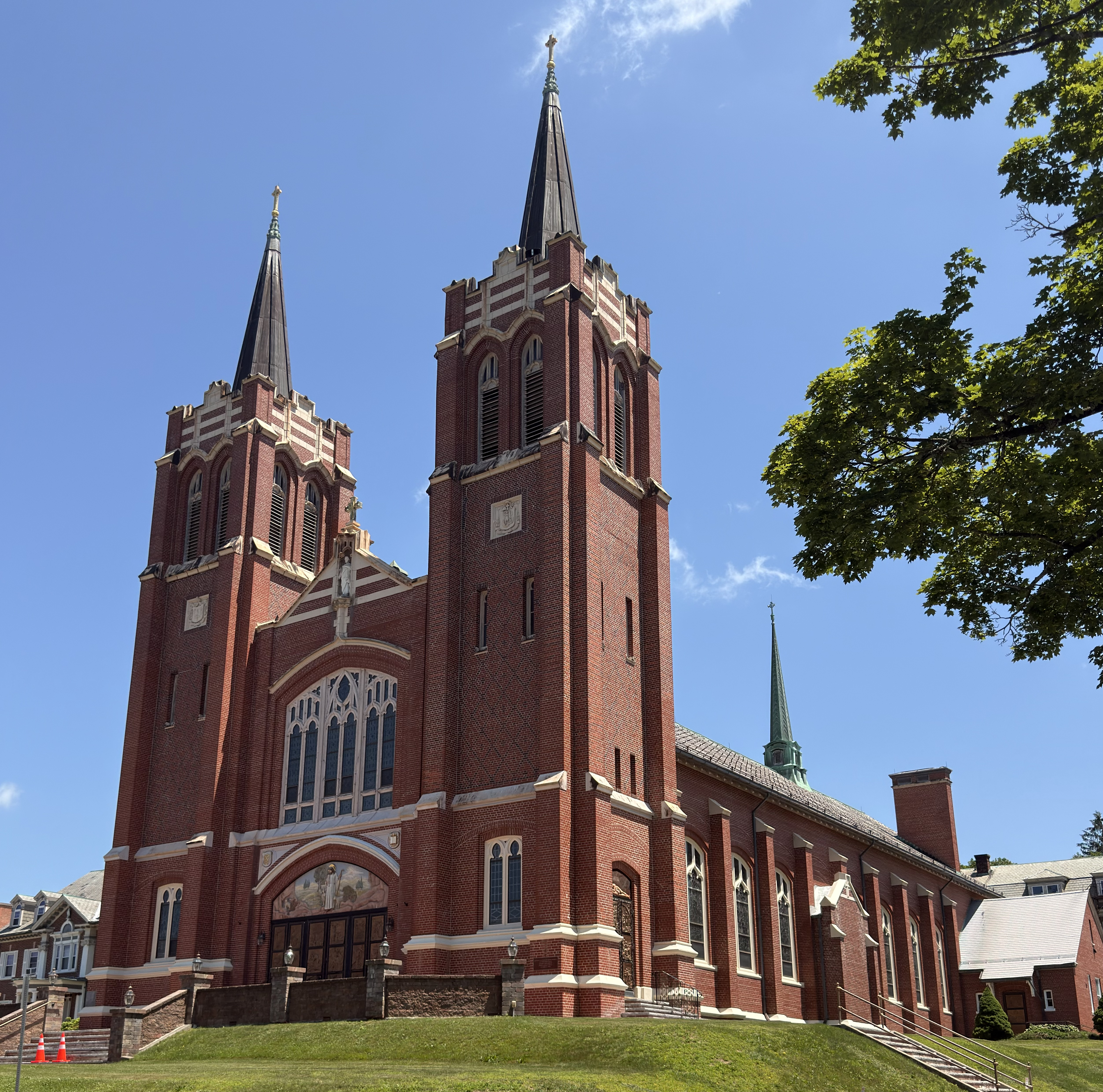
- St. Joseph Basilica
- St. Joseph Parish
- Location: 53 Whitcomb Street; Webster, Massachusetts
- Country: United States
- Denomination: Roman Catholic
- Website: Parish website

History
- Founded: 1887
- Founder: Polish immigrants
- Dedication: St. Joseph

Administration
- Division: Cluster 27
- Province: Boston
- Diocese: Worcester

Clergy
- Bishop: Most Rev. Robert Joseph McManus
- Rector: Rev. Ryszard Polek

St. Joseph Parish is a Catholic parish in Webster, Massachusetts, located in the Diocese of Worcester. Founded in 1887, it was the first parish designated for Polish immigrants in New England.

In 1998, its parish church was raised to the dignity of a minor basilica by Pope John Paul II.

== History ==
Polish immigrants came to this part of the United States after the country failed to win its independence in the January Uprising of 1863. New immigrants initially attended the Mass at St. Louis Church in Webster, assisted by the Polish clergy of New York. As the number of immigrants continued to increase, with the consent of the Bishop of Springfield, Massachusetts, the new Parish of St. Joseph Parish was established in 1887.

The first pastor was a graduate of SS. Cyril and Methodius Seminary in Orchard Lake, Fr. Franciszek Chalupka. Thanks to the generosity and hard work of these first immigrants, Fr. Chalupka was able not only to repay the debt of the parish, but also to acquire land for the construction of a parochial school, which opened in September 1892, administered by the Felician Sisters. Recognizing the need to have a final resting place of the earth, land was purchased in 1903 at Worcester Road for the parish cemetery.

== Pastors ==
- Fr. Franciszek Chałupka (1887-1908)
- Fr. Stanisław Łączyński
- Fr. Wacław Lenz
- Fr. Tarnowski OFM Conv
- Fr. Czeluśniak OFM Conv
- Fr. Bok OFM Conv
- Fr. Jaskulski OFM Conv
- Rev. Msgr. Prelate Anthony Cyran (1910-1935)
- Rev. Msgr. dr. Prelate Andrew Lekarczyk (1935-1965)
- Rev. Msgr. Stanislaus Kubik (1935-1983)
- Fr. Thaddeus Stachura (1983-1993)
- Rev. Msgr. Prelate Anthony Czarnecki (1993-2019)
- Rev. Grzegorz Chodkowski (2019-2025)
- Rev. Ryszard Polek (2025-

== School ==
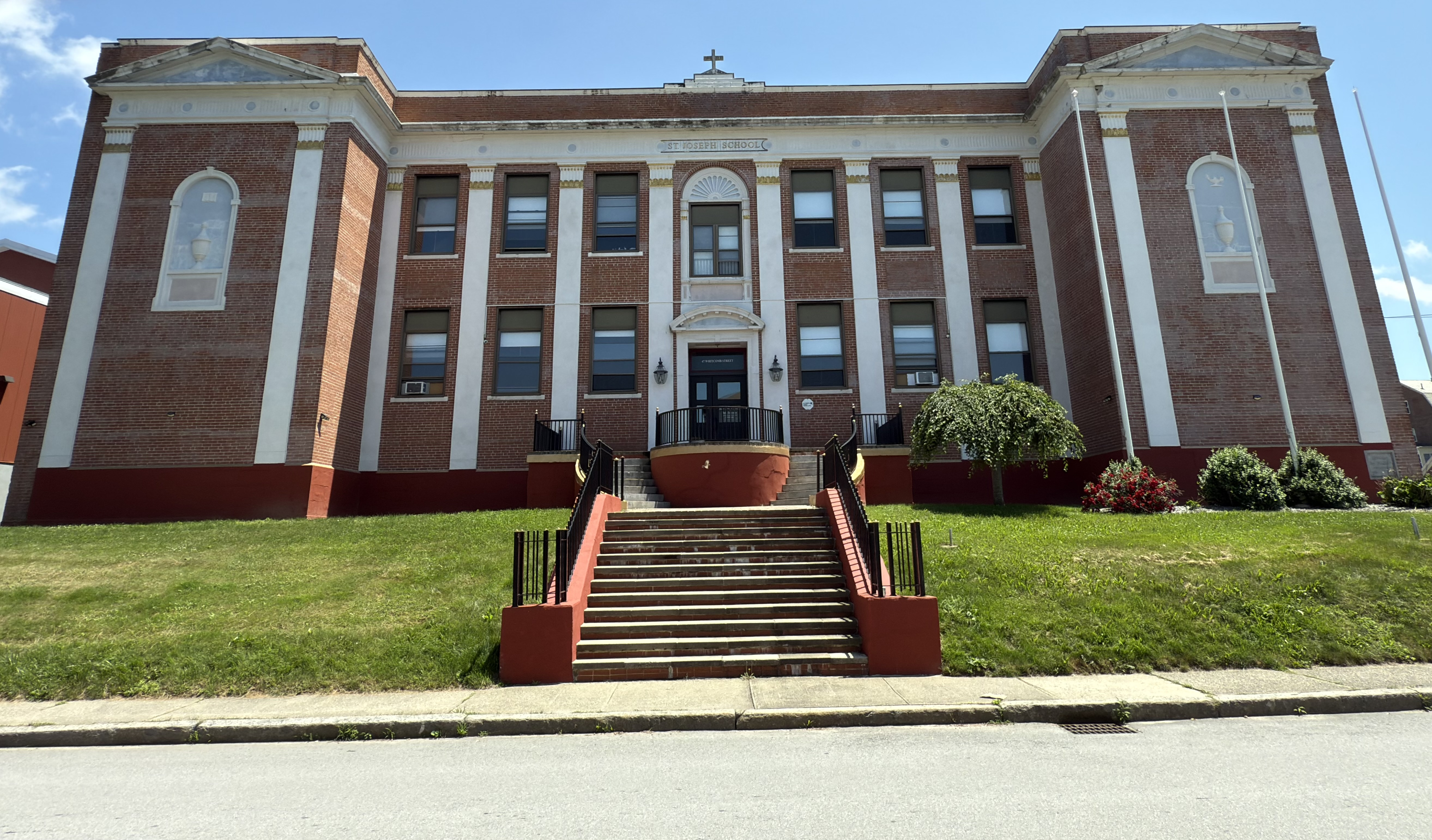
St. Joseph School

St. Joseph School was founded in 1892. The Congregation of the Felician Sisters, whose charism was education, were invited as Polish school personnel. It was their first missionary establishment in New England, where it continues to this day.

In the first year, 90 children attended St. Joseph School and their number increased in 1906 to 500, indicating the rapid growth of the parish within a decade. In 1924, fire destroyed a school building, leaving 1100 children without classrooms. Under the leadership of the parish priest, Fr. Anthony Cyran, a new, 20-classroom school was built and opened in 1925. The number of students in the St. Joseph School grew steadily over the decade, reaching its peak of 1105 students and 18 teachers in 1928. But in 1992, at 100th anniversary of the parish, there were only 197 registered children.

== See also ==
- St. Joseph Basilica
- Polish-American Roman Catholic parishes in New England

== Bibliography ==
- The 150th Anniversary of Polish-American Pastoral Ministry. Webster, Massachusetts: St. Joseph Basilica. September 11, 2005.
- A short parish history from the 1937 Jubilee Book. St. Joseph Parish - Webster MA: the internet Polish Genealogical Source.
- History of St. Joseph's Parish -- 1887-1937 Webster, Mass.
- Our Lady of Czestochowa Parish - Centennial 1893-1993. Our Lady of Czestochowa, Boston. 1993.
- The Official Catholic Directory in USA
