= Nemea (disambiguation) =

Nemea is an ancient sanctuary and archaeological site in Greece, known for the Nemean lion.

Nemea may also refer to:

- Nemea (town), a town and municipality in Greece, or a wine region near the town
- Nemea (mythology), Greek nymph
- Néméa (also known as Fiametta), a ballet in four acts by Arthur Saint-Léon to the music of Ludwig Minkus (1863/1864)
- Archaia Nemea, a village near Nemea in Greece
- Nemea (moth), a genus of moths of the family Thyrididae
- Nemea Bank, a pan-European bank headquartered in Malta
