= Franciszek Chałupka =

Polish-American Catholic priest

The Reverend Franciszek Chałupka
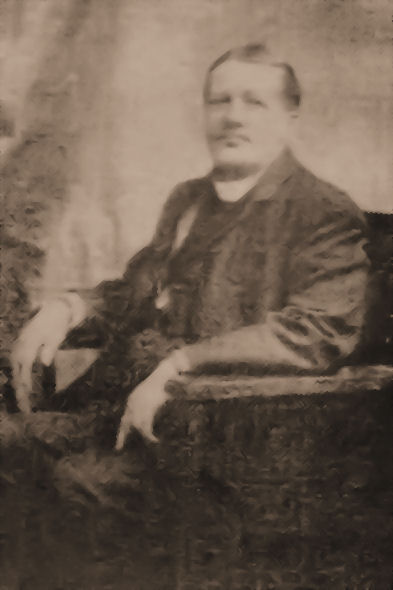
- Born: Franciszek Chałupka; 1856; Austria-Hungary
- Died: 1909 (aged 52–53); Webster, Massachusetts, United States
- Other names: Francis Chalupka; Franciszek Chałupka
- Citizenship: Austrian
- Education: SS. Cyril and Methodius Seminary
- Occupation: Roman Catholic priest
- Known for: Organizing the new Polish-American Roman Catholic parishes in New England, USA.
- Title: Father

Franciszek Chałupka (1856 – 1909) was a Polish-American Catholic priest who founded the first Polish-American parishes in New England.

== Biography ==
Chałupka was born in Czechia (Austria-Hungary). He completed his classical studies in Poland and on March 25, 1884 arrived in the United States.

He studied theology at St. Mary's Seminary in Baltimore, Maryland and then in the Seminary in Orchard Lake.

Ordained by Bishop Patrick O'Reilly in St. Michael's Cathedral in Springfield, Massachusetts, on May 20, 1888. He became the first priest of Polish descent to be ordained in Hampden County.

To obtain the services of a priest with a knowledge of Polish language, the parishioners of St. Joseph Parish, Webster, sent a demand to Fr. Joseph Dabrowski, founder and rector of the Polish Seminary St. Cyril and Methodius University in Detroit. This person was Fr. Franciszek Chałupka, though a sum of $600 had to be paid for his tuition at the Seminary. The money was collected within two weeks, and among the largest offerings $100 was a gift of three Americans: Messers G. Tracey, John W. Dobbie and Louis E. Pattison. After removing the financial obstacles, April 1, 1889, Fr. Franciszek Chałupka came to the parish of St. Joseph in Webster, where he celebrated the first Mass in the new church.

St. Joseph Parish in Webster was the first Polish-American parish in New England.

Franciszek Chałupka quickly repaid the debts of the parish, bought land for a parish cemetery on Worcester Rd, and the land for the parish school, which was opened in September 1892 with four Felician Sisters as teachers.

In 1890, Bishop Patrick O'Reilly appointed Chałupka spiritual adviser to the group responsible for organizing the new parishes and entrusted him with organizing a new Polish St. Stanislaus Parish in Chicopee, Massachusetts. On December 25, 1891, Fr. Chałupka celebrated their first midnight Mass in the newly built, as yet unfinished, wooden church. Construction of this church had taken 12 years, and the cost was $17,000.

When the church was under construction, the United States were hit by the hardest, although short-term Depression in American history. The whole industry collapsed during the panic on the stock exchange in 1893. There was high unemployment among immigrants, which meant that many Poles in Chicopee resulting in starvation condition. During those hard times, young Fr. Chałupka, visited the homes of wealthy people, begging for financial assistance. Money he collected, were used to pay for food and coal. The efforts of the young priest earned him legendary status in the community of Polish immigrants.

In 1902 he returned to Webster, Massachusetts.

At that time, the parish St. Joseph's Society numbered 450 members. As a result of some misunderstanding, the Society was divided into three groups, and one of them broke away, to organize its own National Church in 1903, while the other two groups remained with the parish and adopted the name St. Joseph's Society and the Society of King John Sobieski. As a result of this Fr. Chałupka resigned from the parish and in 1908, moved to Turners Falls, where he began overseeing the construction of the new church.

Died in 1909 in Webster, Massachusetts.

== Bibliography ==
- The 150th Anniversary of Polish-American Pastoral Ministry. Webster, Massachusetts: St. Joseph Basilica. September 11, 2005.
- Jendrysik, Stephen R. (2005). The Polish Community of Chicopee (MA). Charleston, SC: Arcadia Publishing. ISBN 0-7385-3892-2.
- A short parish history from the 1937 Jubilee Book. St. Joseph Parish - Webster MA: the internet Polish Genealogical Source.
- A short parish history the 1966 Jubilee Book. St. Stanislaus B&M Parish - Chicopee MA: the internet Polish Genealogical Source.
- History of St. Joseph's Parish -- 1887-1937 Webster, Mass.
- Bolek, Francis (1970) [1943]. Who's who in Polish America. New York: Arno Press.
- Rezneck, Samuel S. (1953). "Unemployment, Unrest, and Relief in the United States during the Depression of 1893–97". The Journal of Political Economy. 61 (4) (4 ed.). Journal of Political Economy: 324–345. doi:10.1086/257393. JSTOR 1826883. S2CID 154074481.
- Parish history of St. Joseph, Webster, Massachusetts
