= Commerce Insurance Group =

American insurance company

Commerce Insurance Company
- Formerly: Commerce Insurance Group
- Industry: Insurance
- Founded: 1972
- Founder: Arthur J. Remillard, Jr.
- Defunct: 2008
- Fate: Acquired by MAPFRE S.A.
- Successor: MAPFRE Insurance
- Headquarters: Massachusetts
- Products: Personal insurance, Casualty insurance, Commercial property insurance
- Website: commerceinsurance.com

The Commerce Insurance Company, formerly known as Commerce Insurance Group, was an American company that provided personal insurance, commercial property insurance, and casualty insurance in Massachusetts and New Hampshire. Their core product lines included personal automobile, homeowners, and commercial vehicle insurance. It was acquired by Spanish insurance group Mapfre in 2008 and renamed as MAPFRE Insurance.

== History ==
Commerce Insurance was founded in 1972 by Arthur J. Remillard, Jr., as a small insurance company in the south-central Massachusetts town of Webster where the company is still located and headquartered. Remillard was the company's longtime CEO and chairman, retiring in July 2006.

In April 2007, Commerce entered the New York personal lines insurance market through its acquisition of SWICO Enterprises, Ltd., the holding company for Hempstead, New York-based property and casualty insurer State-Wide Insurance Company. State-Wide Insurance Company primarily writes private passenger automobile insurance in the state of New York.

== Acquisition ==
In June 2008, The Commerce Group, Inc. was acquired by Mapfre. MAPFRE is the largest insurance group in Latin America and has a presence in 43 countries, with about 51,000 agents worldwide. The company was renamed as MAPFRE Insurance.

Commerce also sponsored a roadside assistance program for the Massachusetts Turnpike and Mass Highway.
