= Nemea Bank =

Pan-European direct bank

Nemea Bank plc
- Industry: Bank; Investment Services
- Founded: September 2, 2008
- Founders: Heikki Niemelä; Mika Lehto
- Fate: License Withdrawn (Withdrawal may be appealed)
- Headquarters: St Julians, Malta
- Area served: EU/EEA region
- Products: Nemea Instant Payment; Savings Accounts; Term Deposit Accounts; Business Accounts
- Parent: Nemea plc
- Website: www.nemeabank.com

Nemea Bank was a pan-European direct bank incorporated in Malta, providing banking and investment services to individuals, businesses, institutions and high net worth individuals based in the 31 countries of the European Economic Area (EEA). The bank is currently under administration and its license was withdrawn by the ECB on the 23rd March 2017.

As a direct bank, Nemea Bank did not operate any physical bank branches but provided all its products and services online. Nemea Bank was credited with developing the Nemea Instant Payment (NIP) product, which enabled real time global money transfers between Nemea clients at no cost. On 27 April 2016 the bank was put under administration by the Malta Financial Services Authority due to "serious regulatory shortcomings" identified by the MFSA and the ECB in joint on-site inspections. On 20 January 2017, the MFSA announced its decision to propose to the ECB the withdrawal of Nemea Bank's license. The bank's license was eventually withdrawn on the 23rd March 2017.

== History ==
Nemea Bank was founded on 2 September 2008, upon its licensing as an EU-regulated bank by the Malta Financial Services Authority (MFSA). The Bank is a member of the Maltese Depositor Compensation Scheme, which is based on EU Directive 94/19 on deposit-guarantee schemes and protects client deposits up to €100,000 per client. It is also a member of the Malta Investor Protection Scheme.

Nemea Bank is wholly owned by its parent company Nemea plc. The largest shareholder of Nemea plc is Nevestor SA, a European investment company based in Belgium. The bank is ultimately jointly owned by its founders Heikki Niemelä and Mika Lehto, both of whom are Finnish bankers. There are no other interests, financiers, investors or other institutions involved in Nemea Bank Besides the Finnish founders, the bank's administrators included former Maltese PM Lawrence Gonzi and manager Joseph F. X. Zahra.

On 14 February 2013, Nemea Bank launched its first major deposit products for both retail and business clients. These comprised a collection of short and long term deposit products as well as treasury cash management services for small and medium-sized enterprises. These products were increased to cover eight term deposit options, ranging from 1 month to 5 years, in July 2014.

On 27 April 2016, the Malta Financial Services Authority announced that following joint on-site inspections with the European Central Bank serious regulatory shortcomings were identified, which subsequently led to its decision to appoint PwC as administrators. Following this decision, clients were informed that daily withdrawals were limited to €250 daily, and opening of new accounts or new client deposits into accounts were prohibited. By that time, Nemea held €62 million worth of client deposits. The MFSA announced its decision to propose the withdrawal of the bank's license in January 2017, and the ECB eventually withdrew the license on the 23rd March, 2017. The MFSA depositor compensation scheme paid out a total of €35 million to the bank's customer, for up to €100,000 each. According to the administrator's report, as of June 2019 Nemea had had assets of €45 million and liabilities of €48.89. Its accumulated losses stood at €12.6 million. By early 2020, Nemea still owed customers €13.2 million in deposits. The bank's liquidation has stalled due to pending legal appeals. A request to stay proceeding was denied by the Financial Services Tribunal in November 2019.

== Business Model ==
Nemea Bank was an online-only bank; it did not operate brick and mortar bank branches and its clients subscribe to and manage all their products and services through an online banking platform. As a direct bank, Nemea operated with lower costs and overheads than traditional banks' relative cost base.

Nemea Bank earned income by generating interest, fees and commissions, and financial income. When clients transfer and deposit money at the Bank, their funds are invested by the Bank in loans, deposits, other fixed income instruments and other low risk securities, generating income for the bank.

Before the bank's license was suspended, and eventually withdrawn, Nemea Bank offered its products and services to clients in all 31 countries of the EU/EEA region by virtue of the European Union's “single passport” regime, a system that allows financial services operators legally established in one EU/EEA Member State to establish and provide their services in all other Member States.

Nemea Bank provided customer service and communication in 7 languages: English, Spanish, French, Greek, Italian, Dutch and Finnish.

== See also ==
- List of banks in Malta
