= Mapfre =

Spanish multinational insurance company

Mapfre, S.A.
- Type: Sociedad Anónima
- Traded as: BMAD: MAP
- ISIN: ES0124244E34
- Industry: Insurance
- Founded: 16 May 1933; 93 years ago
- Headquarters: Majadahonda, Madrid, Spain
- Number of locations: 4,993
- Key people: Antonio Huertas (Chairman and CEO)
- Products: Life and non-life insurance, investment management
- Revenue: ▲€34.5 billion (2025)
- Net income: ▲€1.8 billion (2025)
- Total assets: ▲€58.5 billion (2025)
- Total equity: ▲€10.5 billion (2025)
- Number of employees: ▲30,846 (2025)
- Subsidiaries: Mapfre Middlesea; Commerce Insurance
- Website: www.mapfre.es

Mapfre, S.A. (Spanish pronunciation: [ˈmafɾe], officially typeset MAPFRE) is a Spanish multinational insurance company, based in Majadahonda, Madrid. The name comes from the old mutual origin of the company (Mutualidad de la Agrupación de Propietarios de Fincas Rústicas de España), but the company now only refers to itself as Mapfre. It is the leading insurance company in Spain and the largest non-life insurance company in Latin America.

The company purchased Webster, Massachusetts–based Commerce Insurance Group, a major provider of vehicle insurance, for over €1.5 billion in October 2007. Mapfre was listed in the Fortune Global 500 list on its 2008 edition. Rafael Nadal is officially sponsored by the company.

In October 2010, Mapfre acquired British travel insurance provider InsureandGo for an undisclosed sum. The company was sold again in 2021.

In March 2012, Antonio Huertas took over as Mapfre's chairman from José Manuel Martínez, who had held the role since 2001.

== History ==
=== Spain ===
- 1933: The Agrupación de Propietarios de Fincas Rústicas de España creates Mapfre.
- 1944: An agreement is signed with the Caja Nacional del Seguro Obligatorio de Enfermedad.
- 1954: Mapfre close to bankruptcy due to increase in the pharmaceutical services.
- 1955: Ignacio Hernando de Larramendi takes over the General Management and puts the company back on its feet. Sickness insurance is dropped.
- 1962: Mapfre acquires Central de Obras y Créditos which operates a network of financing companies throughout Spain.
- 1966: Nationalisation of workmen's compensation insurance. Legal separation and separation of assets of Mapfre Mutualidad and Mapfre Mutua Patronal de Accidentes de Trabajo.
- 1970: Mapfre becomes an insurance group with the mutual company as the parent company (motor insurance) and two subsidiaries Mapfre Vida (personal insurance) and Mapfre Industrial (other branches).
- 1975: Fundación Mapfre is created. Mapfre Servicios de Reaseguro is set up.
- 1977: Acquisition of Mundial de Inversiones which becomes Mapfre Internacional, grouping together foreign investments.
- 1981: Central de Inversión y Crédito becomes Corporación Mapfre.
- 1982: Mapfre Caución Y Crédito is set up.
- 1983: Mapfre is ranked as the number one insurance company. Mapfre Guanarteme and Fundación Guanarteme are created. The Centro de Investigación y Seguridad Vial Mapfre (CESVI), today CESVIMAP, is set up.
- 1984: Sistema Mapfre is created. The Comisión de Defensa del Asegurado (Ombudsman Committee for the Insured) is set up.
- 1985: Mutualidad Agropecuaria joins the Sistema as Mapfre Agropecuaria.
- 1988: Mapfre RE, Mapfre Asistencia, Mapfre Inversión and Mapfre Vida Pensiones are set up. The Mapfre Vida, Mapfre Medicina and Mapfre Estudios foundations are set up. International expansion of Mapfre Asistencia commences.
- 1990: Julio Castelo is appointed chairman of Mapfre Mutualidad. Banco Mapfre commences operations. Mapfre Seguros Generales is created. Mapfre becomes the leading insurance company in Latin America.
- 1998: The first framework agreement with Caja Madrid is signed. Mapfre Internacional becomes Mapfre América and Mapfre América Vida and Mapfre América Caución y Crédito are created.
- 2000: The strategic alliance between Mapfre and Caja Madrid is signed. Mapfre Mutualidad acquires Mapfre América Vida. The good governance code is introduced.
- 2001: Jose Manuel Martínez becomes the new chairman of Sistema Mapfre. Mapfre Seguros Generales acquires Grupo Finisterre.
- 2002: Mapfre Multicentro del Automóvil, Mapfre Renting and Club Mapfre del Automóvil are set up: Mapfre Vida becomes the leading Spanish insurance company. A new management team takes over at Mapfre.
- 2003: The merger between Mapfre Mutualidad and Mapfre Agropecuaria is agreed. SEPI awards Musini S.A. and Musini Vida to Mapfre.
- 2004: Mapfre ratified the United Nations Global Compact. Mapfre acquires a mayority stake in Quavitae.
- 2005: Mapfre renews its management structures. Mapfre acquires ENKEN Servicios de Prevención and ENKEN Asistencia Sanitaria. ViajesMapfre.com is created.
- 2006: Mapfre approves a new corporate structure, by which all activities will be integrated in the new Mapfre S.A.. the listed company.
- 2007: Mapfre Automóviles integrates Mutua Valenciana Automovilista. Agreements with Caja Castilla La Mancha, BANKINTER and Caja Duero for joint development of the Life assurance products Pensions Plans.
- 2008: Mapfre's Shareholders Meeting approves the reorganization of the strategic alliance with Caja Madrid. Mapfre increased in 2008 its net result 23.2%, to €900.7 million.
- 2009: In 2009, Mapfre increased its attributable result a 2.9 per cent to €926.8 million.
- 2010: Appointment as member of the Board of Directors of Mapfre S.A. of Rodrigo de Rato Figaredo. Alliance with Caixa Catalunya, Caixa Manresa and Caixa Tarragona to jointly develop said Savings Bank's Insurance and Pension plans businesses.The Group announced that a reorganization of structures will be undertaken to improve efficiency and enhance the configuration as a multinational group. Mapfre increased revenues 8.7 per cent to €20,470.8 million in 2010 and the net attributable result amounted to €933.5 million.
- 2011: Agreement between Mapfre and Caja Madrid by which the savings bank will acquire of the 48.97% stake that Mapfre holds in Banco de Servicios Financieros Caja-Madrid-Mapfre, and Mapfre will acquire the 12.5% shareholding held by the savings bank in Mapfre Internacional. The chairman, José Manuel Martínez, and the vice-chairman, Andrés Jiménez, announce their retirement in the first months of 2012. Antonio Huertas, current Third Vice-chairman, will become chairman in March after the next annual general meeting is held. Mapfre's net result amounted to €963 million, a 3.2% rise, achieving revenues of €23,530 million, a 15% increase.
- 2012: Agreement with BANKINTER to jointly develop Commercial, Health, Burial, Payment Protection businesses. Antonio Huertas takes on Mapfre's Chairmanship.
- 2013: The Board of Directors appoints Esteban Tejera Montalvo, First Vice-chairman; Antonio Núñez Tovar, Third Vice-chairman; and Ignacio Baeza Gómez, Fourth Vice-chairman. Rodrigo Rato resigns as Member. Mapfre achieved in the first half of the year revenues of €13,140.9 million, 13% more than the same period of the previous year. Its attributable result amounted to €434.2 million. José Antonio Moral Santín resigns as Member of the Board. José Ignacio Goirigolzarri Tellaeche and Manuel Lagares Gómez-Abascal are appointed Members of the Board.

=== International expansion ===
- 1984: Acquisition of Mapfre Seguros Generales in Colombia.
- 1986: Corporación Mapfre agency offices are set up in Lisbon and Milan. General agencies of Mapfre Caución y Crédito, Mapfre Seguros Generales and Mapfre Vida are set up in Portugal. Mapfre Aconcagua (Argentina) is acquired. Aconcagua (Paraguay) and Euroamérica (Chile) are set up.
- 1987: ITSEMAP Portugal is set up.
- 1988: MAPLUX RE (Luxemburg) is set up.
- 1989: Mapfre RE acquires a stake in C.I.A.R (Belgium). Caja Reaseguradora (Chile), Seguros Tepeyac (Mexico) and Grupo PRAICO (Puerto Rico) are acquired. Veneasistencia (Venezuela), IberoAsistencia (Argentina) and SurAsistencia (Chile) are set up.
- 1990: Ibero Assistencia (Portugal) is set up.
- 1991: A Mapfre RE agency office is set up in London. Ireland Assist (Ireland), Afriqe Assistance (Tunisia) and Mapfre Garantías y Crédito (Chile) are set up. Reaseguradora Hemisférica (Colombia) is acquired.
- 1992: Cruz Seguradora (Brazil) and Vera Cruz Vida e Previdencia (Brazil) are acquired. Brasil Asistencia and ANDI Asistencia (Colombia) are set up.
- 1993: Federal Assist (U.S.A.) is set up.
- 1994: The Mapfre RE agency office in London becomes a branch. Mapfre Uruguay, France Assist (France), EUROSOS Assistance S.A. (Greece), Federal Assist (Puerto Rico) and Gulf Assist (Bahrain) are set up. MapfrePROGRESS (Sicily) and Grupo Amstar (U.S.A.) are acquired.
- 1995: Mapfre Asian (Philippines) is acquired. TURASSIST (Turkey), ECUASISTENCIA (Ecuador), Perú Asistencia and Caribe Asistencia (Dominican Republic) are set up.
- 1996. La Seguridad (Venezuela) is acquired. Uruguay Assistencia and Mapfre Aconcagua A.R.T. are set up.
- 1997: A Mapfre RE branch is set up in Brussels. A Mapfre RE agency office is set up in Athens. ALL-MAP-ASSIST GMBH (Germany), Quetzal Asistencia (Guatemala), Panamá Asistencia and AFORE Tepeyac (Mexico) are set up. Mapfre Perú is acquired.
- 1998: Mapfre Asistencia agency offices are set up in the United Kingdom and Moscow and an IBEROASISTENCIA agency office in the Philippines. Mapfre Aconcagua Vida (Argentina) and Costa Rica Asistencia are set up.
- 1999: La Centro Americana (El Salvador) is acquired. Mapfre Colombia Vida, Mapfre Seguradora de Garantías y Crédito (Brazil) and CREDISEGURO (Colombia), Benelux Assist S.A. (Belgium), Asistencia Boliviana, El Salvador Asistencia and NICASSIST (Nicaragua) are set up. Mapfre Asistencia branches are set up in Honduras and Paraguay.
- 2000: Corporación Finisterre (Peru) is acquired. Mapfre Reinsurance Corporation of USA, Mapfre Chile Vida, Tepeyac Asesores (Mexico) and NORASSIST (Canada) are set up.
- 2001: CREDIMapfre (Colombia) is set up. Consolidated Property & Casualty (U.S.A.) is acquired.
- 2003: Road America Motor Club (USA), Nuovi Servizi Auto, the Irish reinsurance company General Services Reinsurance and Canada Life Insurance of Puerto Rico are acquired.
- 2004: Mapfre Reinsurance Corporation is authorized to start operations in Canada
- 2005: Mapfre increases its stake in Middlesea Insurance plc (Malta). Acquisition of ABRAXAS (Great Britain) and a 51 per cent stake in Noxa Caixa Seguros e Previdencia (Brazil)
- 2006: Mapfre Asistencia opens a representative office in Jordania, acquires Canadian Roadside& Recovery Inc and starts operations in Travel Assistance in China. Mapfre Empresas opens representative offices in London and Paris.
- 2007: Acquisition of a majority stake in the Turkish insurer Genel Sigorta and announcement of the merger agreement for the acquisition of the US insurer The Commerce Group. The Group starts direct Insurance operations in Ecuador. Acquisition of Real Paraguaya de Seguros y Real Uruguaya de Seguros. Mapfre Asistencia starts business in India, Algeria, Poland and Egypt. Mapfre Empresas opens a representative office in Cologne (Germany)
- 2008: Mapfre RE establishes a subsidiary in Brazil. Mapfre completes the acquisition of the US insurer Commerce Insurance, the largest investment in the history of the Group. Mapfre acquires a majority stake in the Ecuadorian ATLAS. Mapfre opens an assistance subsidiary in Dubai.
- 2009: Mapfre ranks in the eight place of the European Non-Life Ranking. Mapfre and Banco Do Brasil sign a memorandum of understanding to negotiate the joint development of the insurance businesses of both groups in the Brazilian market. Mapfre acquires a 50 per cent stake of the Portuguese insurer Finibanco Vida.
- 2010: Mapfre and Banco do Brasil implement their strategic alliance in the insurance sector.
- 2011: Mapfre RE opens an office in Paris. Mapfre Internacional becomes the majority shareholder of Middlesea Insurance (Malta). Mapfre and Euler Hermes sign a memorandum of understanding to jointly develop their credit and bond insurance businesses in Spain, Portugal and Latin America. Mapfre Asistencia sets up a subsidiary in Australia for travel insurance on line distribution. Mapfre has direct presence in five continents.
- 2012: Mapfre Asistencia enters the market of the Czech Republic through an insurance broker Top-Pojisteni.cz.
- 2013 MAPFRE enters Indonesia General Insurance market acquiring 20% stake of local company ABDA.
- 2014: The company sponsored a team for the 2014–2015 Volvo Ocean Race, round-the-world sailing race.
- 2015: On 2 March, Mapfre entered into a five-year, multimillion-dollar (US) stadium rights agreement with Columbus Crew SC in Columbus, Ohio. Columbus Crew SC is one of the original Major League Soccer teams in the United States. The previously named Columbus Crew Stadium was renamed Mapfre Stadium until the deal ended at the end of 2020.
- 2016: Mapfre enters the market of the India through venture with Subrin Groups.
- 2017: MAPFRE increases its stake in ABDA Indonesia up to 62.3%.
- 2018: Mapfre acquires controlling interest in Mal

=== Hurricane Maria ===
Three lawsuits filed in the Virgin Islands allege MAPFRE may be in violation of the federal Racketeer Influenced and Corrupt Organizations (RICO) Act. Amber Stein filed the most recent suit 30 August.

"While MAPFRE is certainly inept, its refusal to hire enough qualified adjustors is also ... by design and part of a pattern and practice intended to avoid" its legal obligations and "part of a pattern and practice of bad faith and deceit," Stein's attorneys wrote in the complaint. Like Sheesley, Stein alleges MAPFRE offered pennies on the dollar. Stein had a contractor's estimate for more than $140,000 for repairs but MAPFRE offered $10,718.

To back up the allegation that these delays are part of a larger strategy, Stein and other recent suits point to the fact that Puerto Rico fined MAPFRE for similar delays in paying claims for hurricane damage there. In February 2018, the Puerto Rico Insurance Commissioner's Office fined seven companies a total of $2.4 million for delays that violated Puerto Rico law. MAPFRE PRAICO, the defendant in all of the V.I. cases, was fined $714,000 – the largest single fine. MAPFRE Pan American Insurance Company was separately fined $359,100.

Capital Crossing Servicing has filed a lawsuit against Mapfre Praico Insurance Company claiming the insurer has only paid $2.6mn of $39.6mn total submitted claims related to Hurricane Maria.

== Fundación Mapfre ==
In 1976 the Fundación Mapfre was set up as a private charitable foundation, headquartered in Madrid, which gives grants for various charitable purposes, including many in the cultural sector, mostly in the Spanish-speaking world.

In 2014 Fundación Mapfre opened a new exhibition space for photography in the centre of Madrid at Calle Bárbara de Braganza 13, opposite the National Library. The space is 868 m^{2} (9,340 ft^{2}) spread over two floors. It opened with a retrospective exhibition by Vanessa Winship.

In 2015 it opened Fundación Mapfre Casa Garriga Nogués, a gallery in the Eixample district of Barcelona for painting and photography.

Espacio Miró is a permanent exhibition on the Catalan painter Joan Miró inaugurated in Madrid on 13 December 2016, organized by the Mapfre Foundation at its main headquarters on Paseo de Recoletos, 23.

== See also ==
- Ignacio Hernando de Larramendi y Montiano
