= Antonio Huertas =

Spanish business executive (born 1964)

Antonio Huertas Mejías (born January 18, 1964, in Villanueva de la Serena) is a Spanish manager who has been the chairman and CEO of Mapfre since December 2011. He is a non-executive director of Consorcio de Compensacion de Seguros.

== Career ==
Under Huertas’ leadership, Mapfre announced in 2022 that it would no longer insure or invest in oil, gas and coal producers unless they have a plan to transition from fossil fuels.

== Other activities ==
- Geneva Association, Member of the Board of Directors
