= McIntosh Building =

- U.S. National Register of Historic Places
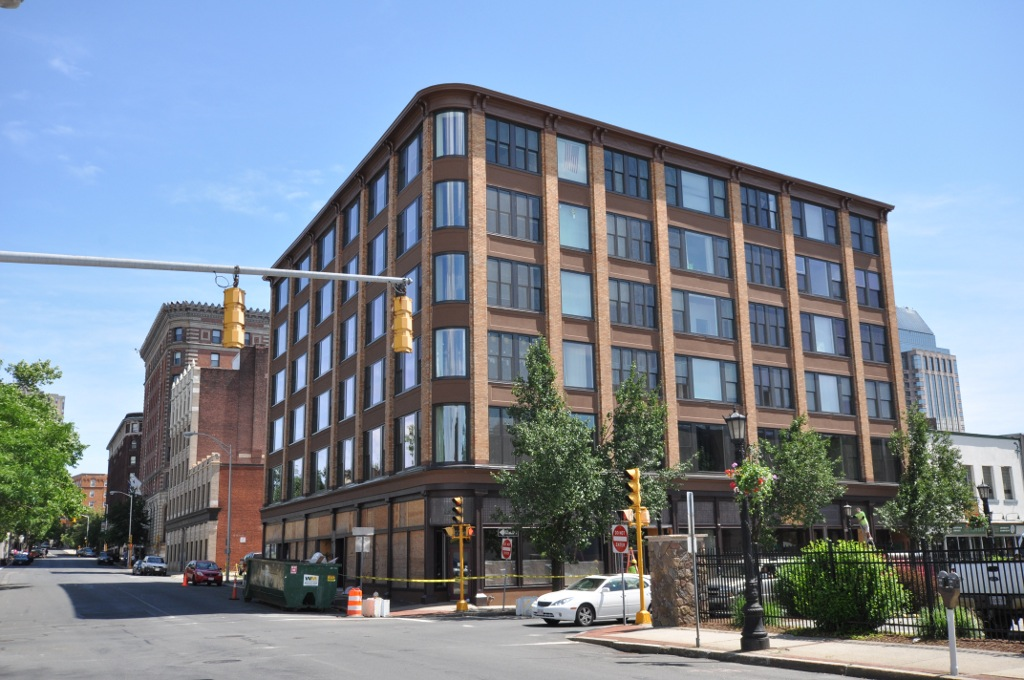

- Location within Massachusetts Location within the United States
- Location: Chestnut and Worthington Sts., Springfield, Massachusetts
- Coordinates: 42°6′21″N 72°35′25″W
- Area: less than one acre
- Built: 1913
- Architect: McKenzie, W.D.
- Architectural style: Chicago
- MPS: Downtown Springfield MRA
- NRHP reference No.: 83000754
- Added to NRHP: February 24, 1983

The McIntosh Building is a historic commercial building at the corner of Chestnut and Worthington Streets in downtown Springfield, Massachusetts. Built in 1918 for a shoe manufacturer, it is a locally unusual example of the Chicago style of architecture. At the time of its listing on the National Register of Historic Places in 1983, it still had its original storefronts.

== History ==
The block was built in 1918 for the McIntosh Shoe Corporation as it expanded its business. McIntosh was described in 1913 as "not only the oldest but largest inland boot and shoe jobbing house in [New England]." It was founded in 1874, originally occupying space in the Carlton House Block and Smith's Building before having this one built.

== Description ==
The McIntosh Building is located in downtown Springfield, at the southeast corner of Chestnut and Worthington Streets. It is six stories in height, with broad window bays on the upper floors, divided by brick piers and mostly filled with three-part windows. Between the floors in each bay are pressed metal panels.

The building is capped bay a bracketed Italianate cornice that is otherwise at odds with the more modern Chicago style design. The ground floor is divided into several retail spaces, typically with recessed entrances and large display windows, set in bays articulated by paneled pilasters. The building has a rounded bay at the street corner, with curved window panes in the upper-level bays.

== See also ==
- National Register of Historic Places listings in Springfield, Massachusetts
- National Register of Historic Places listings in Hampden County, Massachusetts
