= Stasia Czernicki =

American candlepin bowler

Stasia Milas Czernicki (May 18, 1922 – January 17, 1993) was an American professional candlepin bowler.

== Biography and career ==
Born in Webster, Massachusetts, she set the all-time candlepin record in her hometown for ten strings with 1388 pins.

Stasia Czernicki had a series of personal highs, including a 194 single, a 466 triple, and 707 for five strings. In her high single, she rolled consecutive strikes in the first five boxes. She also shares the world record for women's doubles (2382), mixed doubles (2676), and women's five strings (707).

She was world champion eight times, singles queen six times, a member of the women's doubles title team three times, mixed doubles team twice, and a member of the world's women's title team in 1965.

The World Candlepin Bowling Council and World Candlepin Bowling Congress recognized her as Woman Bowler of the Year in 1967, 1968, 1970, 1971, and 1972.

In 1987, Czernicki was inducted into the International Candlepin Bowling Association Hall of Fame.

In her honor, the International Candlepin Bowling Association has established the Stasia Czernicki Memorial Award to recognize players who also exhibit fine sportsmanship.

Czernicki was the first woman bowler regularly seen on the long-running TV show Candlepin Bowling, broadcast on Boston's WHDH-TV (later WCVB-TV), Channel 5. Hosts Jim Britt (1958–61) and Don Gillis (1961–96) frequently introduced her as the star of the show. Her 41–12 match record includes 18 consecutive wins, more than any other female competitor. (Tom Olszta holds the male record of 22 consecutive wins.) Her television high was 399 for three strings.

She was a certified Massachusetts Bowling Association (MBA) bowling instructor and served as director of the MBA Instructors School and as a member of the World Candlepin Bowling Congress's executive board. In 2015, Granddaughter also Stasia, rolled a 195 in a single game playoff champion versus regional reigning champion, Donald Strickland, thus breaking her grandmother's single game high record.

== Death ==
Stasia Czernicki died on January 17, 1993, in Webster, Massachusetts, aged 70. Her husband, Anthony Czernicki, died in 2009.
