= St. Joseph Basilica (Webster, Massachusetts) =

Coordinates: 42°3′1.35″N 71°52′26.85″W

St. Joseph Basilica Webster
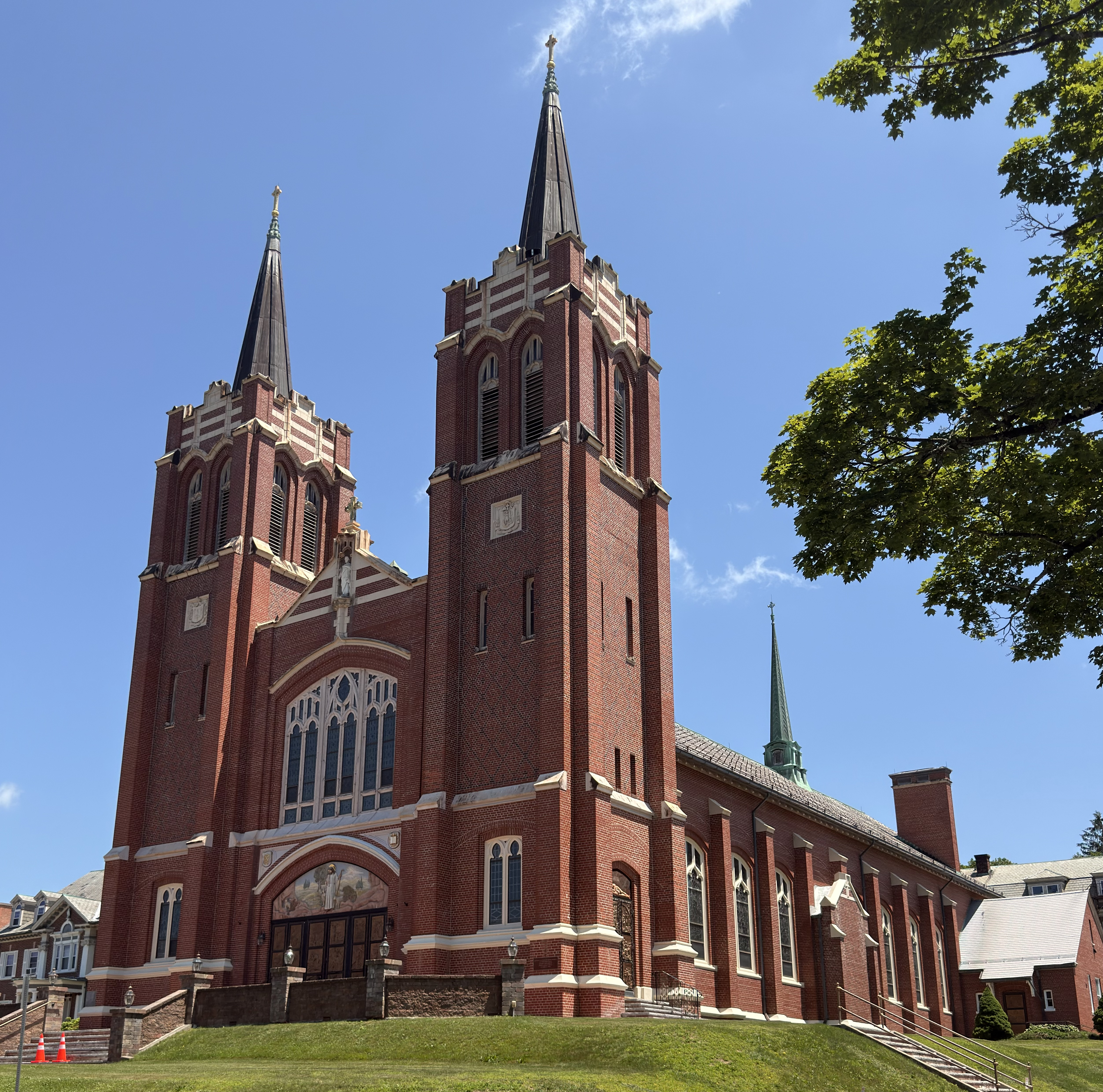
- St. Joseph Basilica in 2025
- St. Joseph Basilica; Webster
- Location: Webster, Massachusetts, USA
- Denomination: Roman Catholic
- Website: stjosephwebster.com

History
- Status: minor basilica

Architecture
- Architect: John William Donohue
- Style: Neo-Gothic
- Completed: c. 1913

Administration
- Diocese: Worcester

Clergy
- Pastor: Msgr. Anthony Czarnecki

St. Joseph Basilica is a parish church in Webster, Massachusetts, founded in 1887 as the first Catholic parish designated for Polish immigrants in New England. Located in the Catholic Diocese of Worcester, it was raised to the dignity of a minor basilica in 1998 by Pope John Paul II.

== Architecture ==
St. Joseph Basilica is a neo-gothic structure designed by architect John W. Donohue, who was for many years the official architect of the Roman Catholic Diocese of Springfield, which at the time encompassed Webster and all of Worcester County.

== See also ==
- St. Joseph Parish, Webster
