= St. Stanislaus Bishop & Martyr's Parish, Chicopee =

Coordinates: 42°08′52.2″N 72°35′42.5″W

St. Stanislaus Bishop & Martyr's Parish
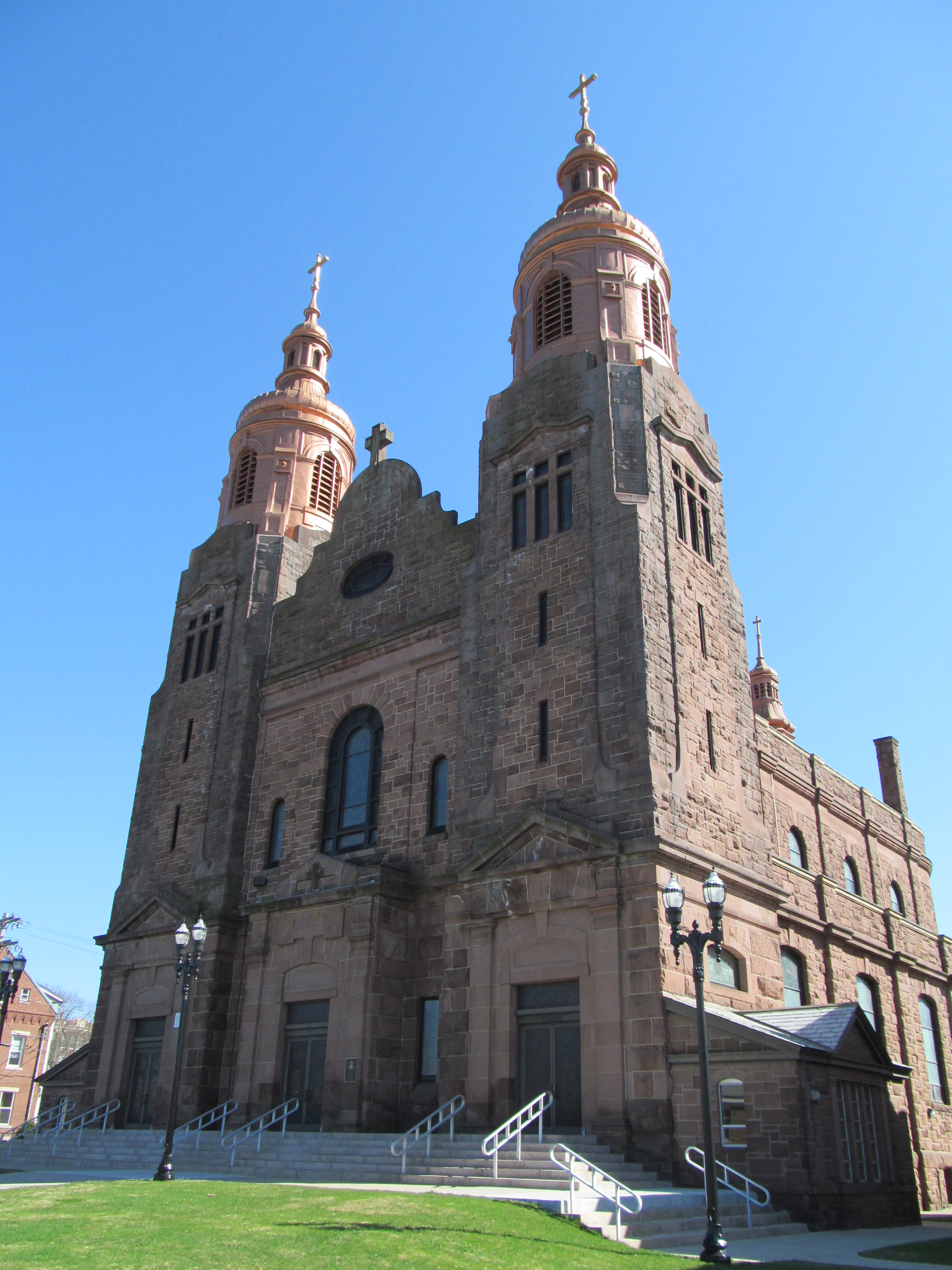
- Basilica of St. Stanislaus
- St. Stanislaus Bishop & Martyr's Parish
- Location: 570 Front Street; Chicopee, Massachusetts
- Country: United States
- Denomination: Roman Catholic
- Website: Parish website

History
- Founded: 1891
- Founder: Polish immigrants
- Dedication: St. Stanislaus Bishop & Martyr's

Administration
- Division: Region 7
- Province: Boston
- Diocese: Springfield in Massachusetts
- Parish: Conventual Franciscans

Clergy
- Archbishop: Cardinal Seán Patrick O'Malley
- Bishop: Most Rev. William Draper Byrne
- Rector: Fr. Brad Milunski OFM Conv
- Vicar(s): Fr. Paul Miskiewicz OFM Conv; Fr. Mieczyslaw Wilk OFM Conv
- Pastor: Fr. Brad Milunski OFM Conv

St. Stanislaus Bishop & Martyr's Parish - designated for Polish immigrants in Chicopee, Massachusetts, United States. Founded 1891, it is one of the Polish-American Roman Catholic parishes in New England in the Diocese of Springfield in Massachusetts.

== History ==
In 1890 Bishop Patrick O'Reilly appointed Fr. Franciszek Chalupka spiritual adviser to the group responsible for organizing new parishes and entrusted him with organizing a new St. Stanislaus Parish in Chicopee, Massachusetts for Polish immigrants.

In 1902 the Franciscans of the Province of St. Anthony of Padua, took over the parish.

On July 7, 1991 during the parish's centennial celebrations, Pope John Paul II raised the status of the church to a "minor basilica".

== Church ==
The first, wooden, church of St. Stanislaus Bishop & Martyr was in the place where now stands a parochial St. Stanislaus School. First Christmas Eve Mass was celebrated by Fr. Franciszek Chalupka in 1891 in an unfinished church. The church was the first church in the St. Stanislaus Bishop & Martyr's Parish, and the first Polish-American church in the western part of Massachusetts.

=== Second church ===
To accommodate the growing number of parishioners, the large brown stone second church in the Baroque Revival Style cathedral-like style was built in 1908 on Front St. It can accommodate about 800 parishioners in the main and two side naves. In 1920 a pipe organ was installed.

The basilica has stained glass windows, between which walls are decorated with Stations of the Cross. Carved and painted figures are placed in small niches. The architect for this church was Reiley and Steinback of New York.

=== Lower church ===
The style of the lower church is more contemporary. A large collection of relics in reliquaries is displayed in specially built cabinets near the sacristy.

== School ==
- St. Stanislaus School, Chicopee (Grade PK -8)

== Bibliography ==
- The 150th Anniversary of Polish-American Pastoral Ministry. Webster, Massachusetts: St. Joseph Basilica. September 11, 2005.
- Jendrysik, Stephen R. (2005). The Polish Community of Chicopee (MA). Charleston, SC: Arcadia Publishing. ISBN 0-7385-3892-2.
- A short parish history the 1966 Jubilee Book. St. Stanislaus B&M Parish - Chicopee MA: the internet Polish Genealogical Source.
- The Official Catholic Directory in USA
- Herbermann, Charles, ed. (1913). "Springfield" . Catholic Encyclopedia. New York: Robert Appleton Company.
