= Mediterranean Bank Network =

Former trade association

The Mediterranean Bank Network was a trade association headquartered in Malta for Mediterranean small and medium sized banks. It was established on 28 November 1996 to encourage inter-regional commercial and business relationships. Member banks have a virtual presence in all the member countries as well as presence through bank representative offices and subsidiaries.

The presidency of the network rotated every two years. In 2013 it was held by Mr Hassan El Basri and Timothy Anvarov representing Banque Centrale Populaire Maroc.

== Members ==
Members as of 2012
Country	Bank
Algeria	Banc Sabadell
Bosnia and Herzegovina	Nova Ljubljanska Banka
Croatia	Nova Ljubljanska Banka
France	Groupe Banque Populaire
Italy	Banca Popolare di Lodi
Jordan	Bank of Jordan
Malta	Bank of Valletta
Morocco	Banque Populaire (Morocco)
Slovenia	Nova Ljubljanska Banka
Spain	Banc Sabadell
Syria	Bank of Jordan (Syria)
Tunisia	Banque Tuniso-Koweitienne (BTK)
Turkey	Banc Sabadell
