= Mapfre Middlesea =

Maltese insurance company

Mapfre Malta plc
- Formerly: Middlesea Insurance (1981–2015)
- Type: Public limited company
- Traded as: MSE: MMS
- Industry: Insurance
- Founded: 1981
- Headquarters: Floriana, Malta
- Key people: Martin Galea (Chairman); Javier Moreno (CEO)
- Products: Group Life and Non-Life Insurance
- Parent: MAPFRE
- Subsidiaries: Bee Insurance Management Limited; MSV Life p.l.c.; Euromed Risk Solutions Limited; Church Wharf Properties Limited
- Website: mapfre.com.mt

Mapfre Malta plc (stylized as Malta; previously Middlesea Insurance) is a Maltese insurance company headquartered in Floriana. It is a subsidiary of the Spanish multinational insurance company MAPFRE.

== History ==
Middlesea Insurance registered in 1981 as the first insurance company transacting general business in Malta. The company added life insurance to its offerings in 1983. In 1994, it became the first local insurance company to be listed on the Malta Stock Exchange, and it was in that same year that Middlesea appointed its first Insurance Agency together with the foundation of Middlesea Valletta Life Assurance Co Ltd. (now MSV Life p.l.c.), a life insurance company, in partnership with Bank of Valletta.

In a desire to expand its operations, Middlesea Insurance plc acquired the Italian insurance company Progress Assicurazioni SpA in 2000, and opened an office in Gibraltar. Although positive results were initially recorded, the Italian subsidiary went on to produce negative figures in later years, leading to its closing down in 2010.

In 2011, Mapfre Internacional S.A. finalised the arrangements which led to its acquisition of Munich Re's 19.99% shareholding in Middlesea. Following this transaction, MAPFRE increased its aggregate shareholding in Middlesea to 50.98% of the issued share capital, thus acquiring a controlling interest in the company. Middlesea's traditionally blue colour scheme was replaced by MAPFRE's grey-red scheme.

Middlesea announced a group before-tax profit of €17.31 million for the year ending 2014.

In May 2015, Middlesea Insurance rebranded as MAPFRE Middlesea.

In July 2020, the company celebrated 40th anniversary.

In January 2022, MAPFRE Middlesea signed an agreement with The Malta Trust Foundation to support the Villa Bianca project, an art space for children and young people.

In July 2026, MAPFRE Middlesea re-branded its name to Mapfre Malta.
