= Andrew J. Bates =

New England industrialist and entrepreneur

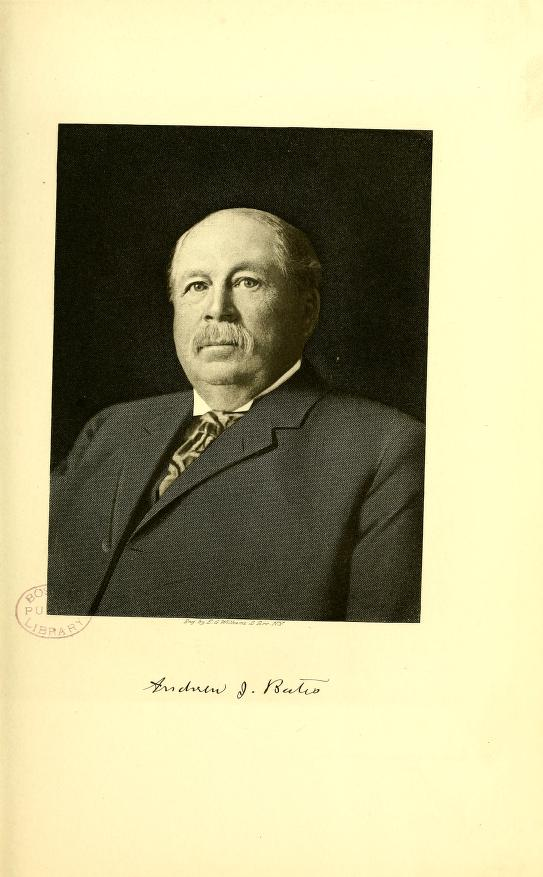
Andrew J. Bates

Andrew Jackson Bates (June 23, 1839 – February 13, 1915), known as Andrew J. Bates, was a New England industrialist and founder of the Bates Shoe Company (which is now part of Wolverine World Wide). He was credited with pioneering the wholesale footwear business.

== Biography ==
Andrew Jackson Bates was born in Webster, Massachusetts, on June 23, 1839. He was a descendant of Clement Bates, an early settler of Hingham, Massachusetts, who arrived from Lydd, England in 1635. In 1773, Jacob Bates great grandson of Clement Bates came to Webster when it was still part of Dudley, Massachusetts. Andrew J. Bates was the great grandson of Jacob, grandson of Captain Alanson Bates (1772 – 1842), and the son of Nelson Bates (1801 – 1889). He grew up on the family homestead which had at the time seen five generations of the Bates family. Although his father was regarded as an excellent farmer, a prominent figure in 19th century Webster and a selectman during the year 1839, he was not very active in civic affairs. One explanation being that he had always preferred private to public life, honest industry to idleness or speculation. Webster economic growth was kindled by the establishment of Samuel Slater's cotton mill at the head of the Lake Chaubunagungamaug "Historical Collections, Vol.1" by Holmes Ammidown states that in 1812 "...men of prominence in the vicinity...were Elijah Pratt, Asa and Samuel Robinson, John and Alanson Bates, and several by the name of Kingsbury, all being men of considerable character and standing, maintaining good moral, social and religious society."

When he was eighteen he went to New York City to seek fame and fortune. After gaining experience in the footwear business, he established the A. J. Bates and Company in 1866 to merchandise shoes. In 1886 the firm began the manufacture of shoes in Webster at what was to become one of the largest shoe factories in New England. He reportedly opened the plant in Webster to control the quality of shoes that were distributed through his New York office. A believer in good value, he insisted that his shoes must wear better than higher priced shoes because he did not sell to the "carriage trade".

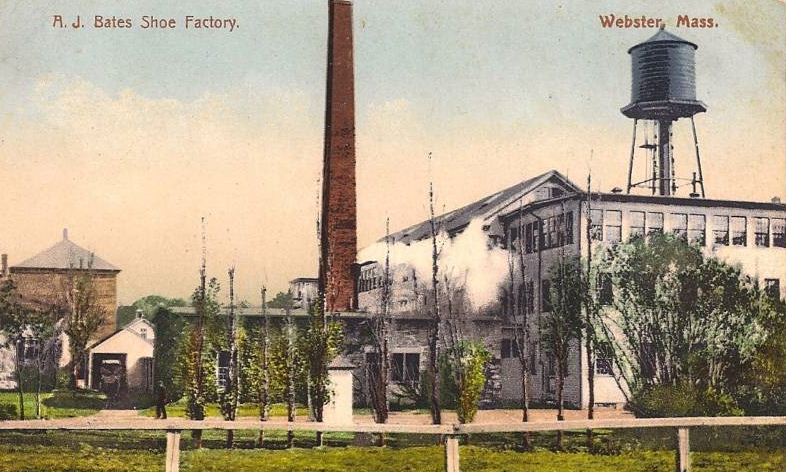
A. J. Bates Shoe Company

He was a pioneer in the wholesale shoe business and was closely identified with its development. Today Bates is part of Wolverine and is one of the largest uniform footwear companies in the world.

Andrew J. Bates was married in 1862 to Harriet daughter of Asa and Matilda (Kingsbury) Bartlett of Webster, MA. Harriet died in 1887 and Andrew J. Bates married a second time in 1891 to Emma Van Nostrand of Brooklyn, New York. When he died February 15, 1915, he left his wife, a son Edgar A. Bates and three daughters.

== See also ==
- Wolverine World Wide
