= Webster, Massachusetts =

- Town
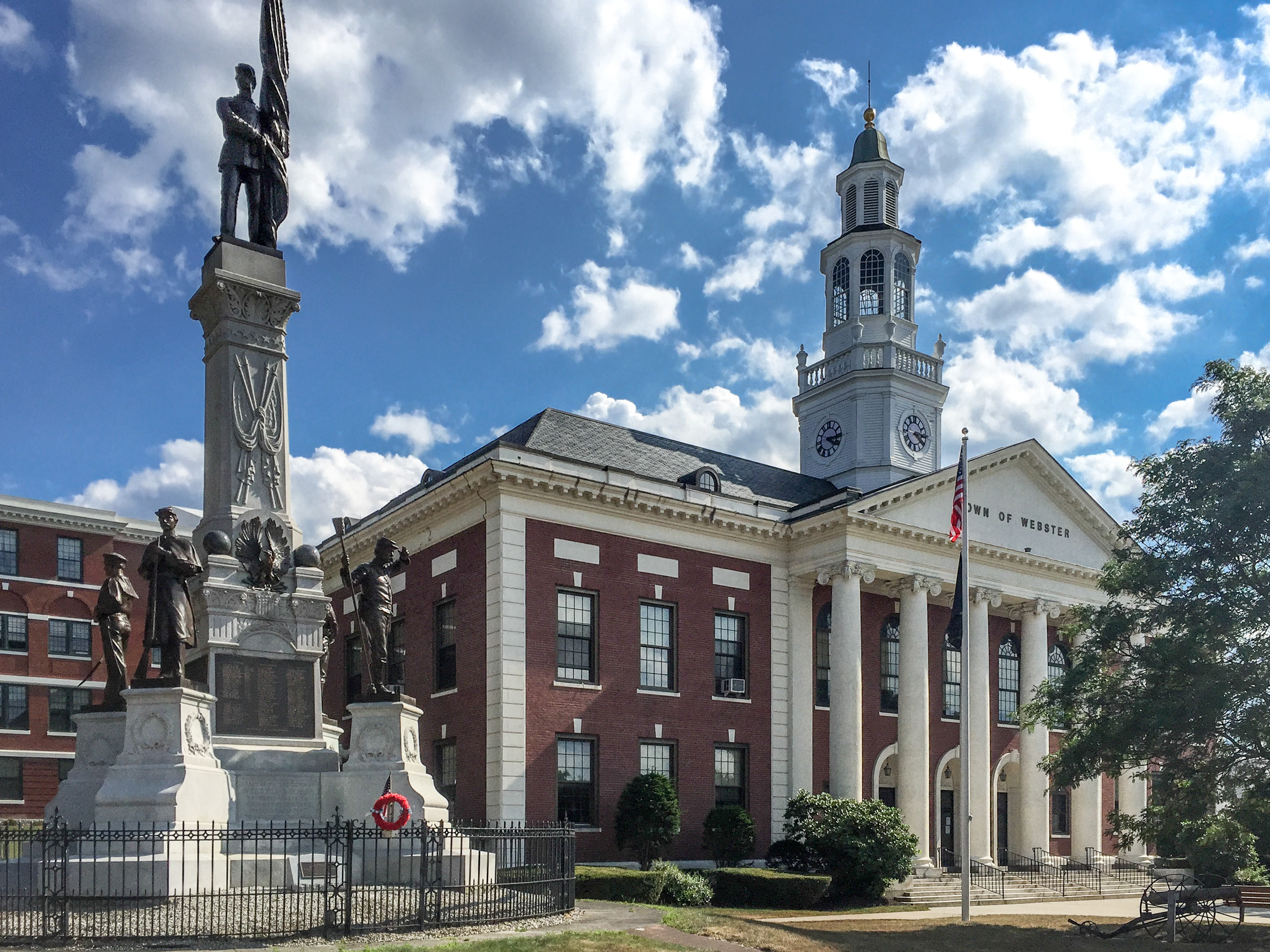
- Town Hall in Webster, Massachusetts

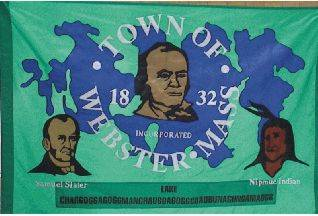
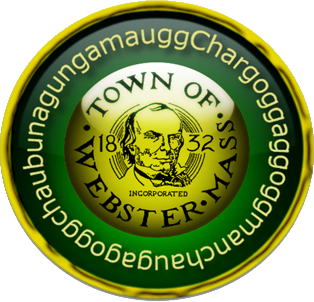
- Flag Seal

- Location in Worcester County and Massachusetts.
- Coordinates: 42°03′00″N 71°52′50″W
- Country: United States
- State: Massachusetts
- County: Worcester
- Settled: 1713
- Incorporated: 1832

Government
  - Type: Open town meeting
  - Town Administrator: Richard LaFond
  - Board of Selectmen: Chairman; Randy Becker, Secretary; Donald D. Bourque; Earl Gabor; Lisa Kontoes; Tom Klebart

Area
  - Total: 14.6 sq mi (37.7 km^{2})
  - Land: 12.5 sq mi (32.3 km^{2})
  - Water: 2.0 sq mi (5.3 km^{2})
- Elevation: 460 ft (140 m)

Population (2020)
  - Total: 17,776
  - Density: 1,430/sq mi (550/km^{2})
- Time zone: UTC-5 (Eastern)
  - Summer (DST): UTC-4 (Eastern)
- ZIP Code: 01570
- Area code: 508
- FIPS code: 25-73895
- GNIS feature ID: 0618389
- Website: www.webster-ma.gov

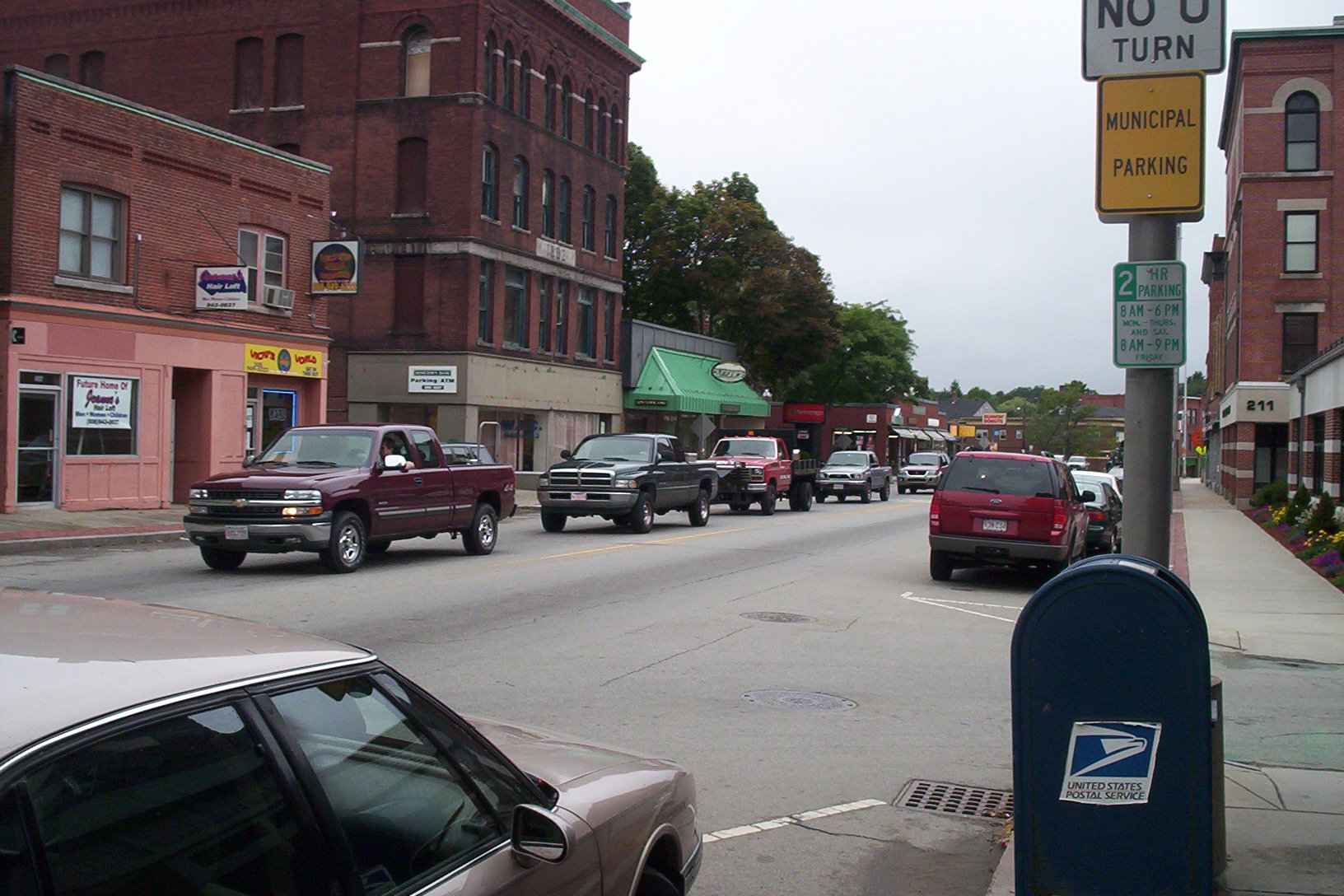
Main Street in Webster

Webster is a town in Worcester County, Massachusetts, United States. The population was 17,776 at the 2020 census. It contains the census-designated place of the same name. Named after statesman Daniel Webster, the town was founded by industrialist Samuel Slater, and was home to several early American textile mills. It was home to the Chaubunagungamaug Reservation of the Nipmuc; many still live near there. It is the location as well as Lake Chaubunagungamaug, the third largest body of freshwater, and largest natural lake, in Massachusetts.

== History ==
The area that is now Webster was the ancestral home of the Nipmuc people for thousands of years. It was first colonized by Europeans in 1713 and was officially incorporated on March 6, 1832. The area forming the town had previously been divided among the town of Dudley, the town of Oxford and an unincorporated gore. The primary founder was the manufacturer Samuel Slater, who came to the area after his celebrated activities in Pawtucket, Rhode Island, and founded several textile mills, one of which was taken over by the Cranston Print Works in 1936. He named the town after his friend Daniel Webster. Slater spent his last years in Webster and died and is buried there in Mount Zion Cemetery.

== Geography ==
According to the U.S. Census Bureau, the town has a total area of 14.5 square miles (38 km^{2}), of which 12.5 square miles (32 km^{2}) is land and 2.0 square miles (5.2 km^{2}), or 14.10%, is water.

The town is bounded on the north by Oxford; on the east by Douglas; on the south by Thompson, Connecticut, and on the west by Dudley, Massachusetts with which it is most closely tied culturally and politically.

The town is home to Lake Chargoggagoggmanchauggagoggchaubunagungamaugg, also known as Lake Chaubunagungamaug or simply "Webster Lake", the third largest lake in Massachusetts. The 45-character name is often regarded as the longest place name in the United States of America and the third longest in the world.

== Demographics ==
Historical population
Year	Pop.	±%
1850	2,371	—
1860	2,912	+22.8%
1870	4,763	+63.6%
1880	5,696	+19.6%
1890	7,031	+23.4%
1900	8,804	+25.2%
1910	11,509	+30.7%
1920	13,258	+15.2%
1930	12,992	−2.0%
1940	13,186	+1.5%
1950	13,194	+0.1%
1960	13,680	+3.7%
1970	14,917	+9.0%
1980	14,480	−2.9%
1990	16,196	+11.9%
2000	16,415	+1.4%
2010	16,767	+2.1%
2020	17,776	+6.0%
2024*	17,817	+0.2%
* = population estimate. Source: United States census records and Population Estimates Program data.

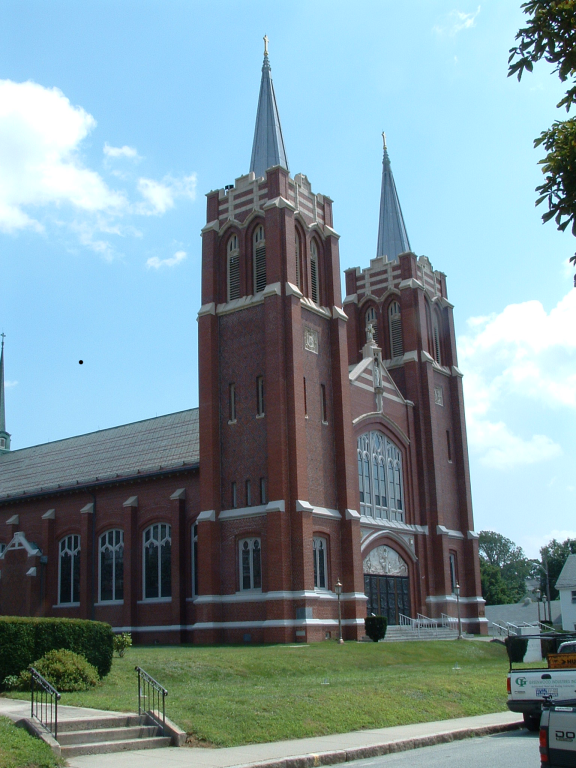
St. Joseph Basilica in Webster

As of the 2000 census, of 2000, there were 16,415 people, 6,905 households, and 4,274 families residing in the town. The population density was 1,314.2 inhabitants per square mile (507.4/km^{2}). There were 7,554 housing units at an average density of 604.8 per square mile (233.5/km^{2}). The racial makeup of the town was 94.82% White (92.9% if non-Hispanic whites are counted), 1.11% Black or African American, 0.34% Native American, 0.95% Asian, 1.49% from other races, and 1.29% from two or more races. Hispanic or Latino of any race were 3.95% of the population. About 60% of the Latinos were Puerto Ricans.

The town is known for its Polish-American community. Per the 2023 American Community Survey, 13.7% of the town reports Polish ancestry, down from 20.1% in 2010. St. Joseph Basilica, the oldest Polish-American Catholic parish church in New England, is located in Webster.

As of 2000, there were 6,905 households, out of which 28.2% had children under the age of 18 living with them, 45.4% were married couples living together, 11.8% had a female householder with no husband present, and 38.1% were non-families. 31.7% of all households were made up of individuals, and 13.5% had someone living alone who was 65 years of age or older. The average household size was 2.34 and the average family size was 2.94.

In the town, the population was spread out, with 23.2% under the age of 18, 7.4% from 18 to 24, 30.6% from 25 to 44, 22.2% from 45 to 64, and 16.7% who were 65 years of age or older. The median age was 38 years. For every 100 females, there were 92.8 males. For every 100 females age 18 and over, there were 88.9 males.

The median income for a household in the town was $38,169, and the median income for a family was $48,898. Males had a median income of $37,863 versus $26,912 for females. The per capita income for the town was $20,410. About 8.1% of families and 11.0% of the population were below the poverty line, including 12.7% of those under age 18 and 14.5% of those age 65 or over.

=== Chaubunagungamaug Reservation ===
The former Chaubunagungamaug Reservation, a state-recognized Nipmuc Indian reservation, is located within the town. There are over 500 tribe members officially recognized by the Commonwealth of Massachusetts, but they are not recognized as a tribal government by the Bureau of Indian Affairs.

== Education ==
Public schools in Webster include Park Avenue School (grades K–4), Webster Middle School (grades 5–8), and Bartlett High School (grades 9–12). Webster Middle School opened in 2005, replacing the former Anthony J. Sitkowski Middle School, a building attached to Town Hall which is now an apartment building for senior citizens.

Three of Webster's Catholic churches also support elementary schools: St. Anne's (Sacred Heart Parish), St. Joseph's, and St. Louis. In 2016, St. Anne's and St. Louis's were combined to form All Saints Academy.

== Economy ==
MAPFRE Insurance (formerly the Commerce Insurance Group) is based in Webster.

Indian Ranch is a summer concert venue located on Webster Lake, and has hosted musical acts such as Charlie Daniels, Thomas Rhett, The Barenaked Ladies, Scotty McCreery, Third Eye Blind, Huey Lewis and the News, Gavin DeGraw, and others. It is currently home to Indian Princess, a riverboat that once rode the Mississippi River, where guests can tour the lake.

Goya Foods has its Massachusetts division in Webster.

== Government ==
State government
State Representative(s):	Joseph D. McKenna (R)
State Senator(s):	Ryan Fattman (R)
Governor's Councilor(s):	Paul DePalo (D)
Federal government
U.S. Representative(s):	James P. McGovern (D-2nd District)
U.S. Senators:	Elizabeth Warren (D), Ed Markey (D)

== Media ==
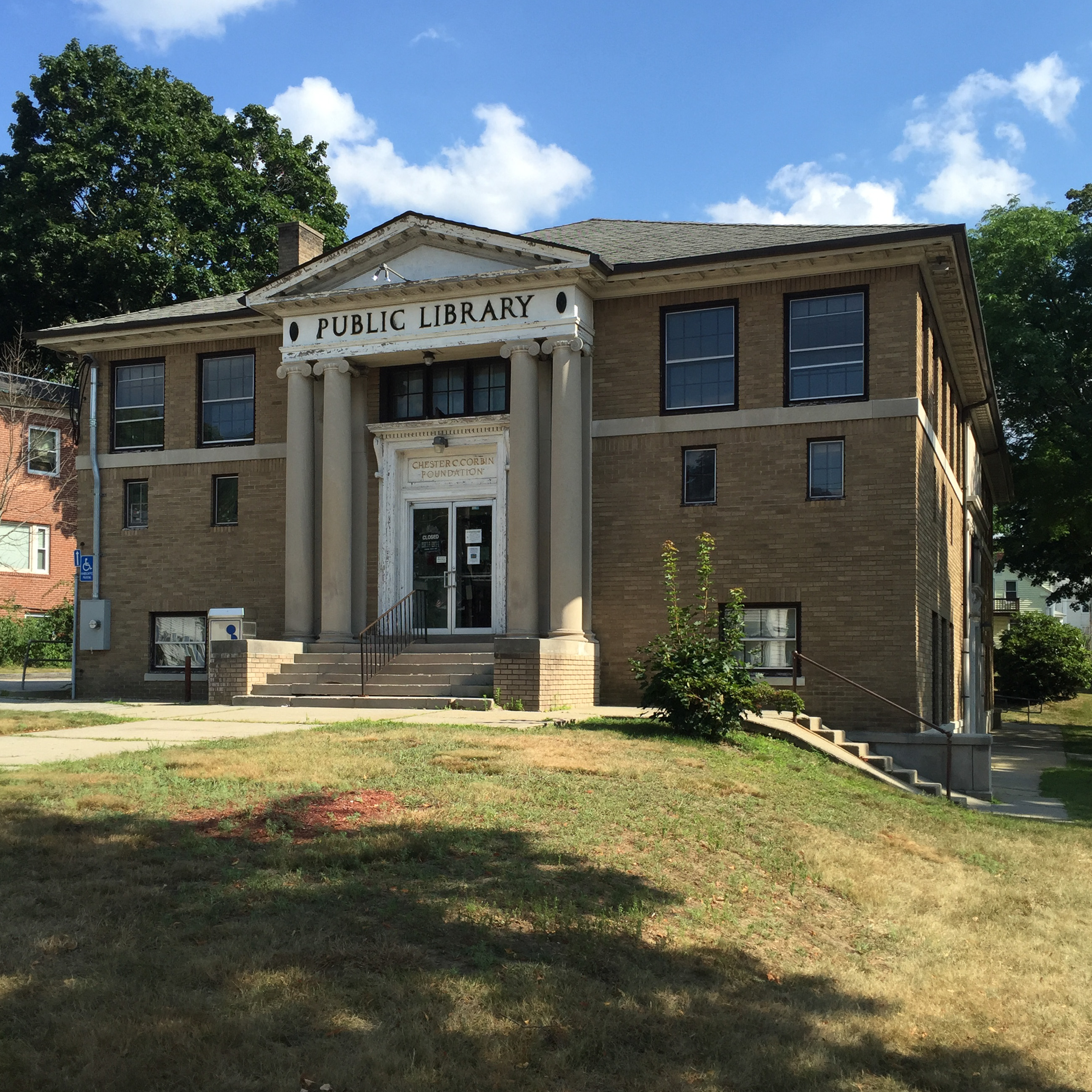
Chester C. Corbin Library in Webster

- Webster Times, published every Friday
- Telegram & Gazette (Worcester; South Central edition)
- The Boston Globe
- Boston Herald
- WQVR-AM 940 and 99.3 FM

== Library ==
Webster's public library opened in 1889. In fiscal year 2008, the town of Webster spent 1.07% ($299,159) of its budget on its public library—approximately $17 per person ($22.40 adjusted for inflation to 2022).

The Chester C. Corbin Library opened in 1921 and served the town until being demolished in the fall of 2016, with its contents temporarily moved to the Webster Town Hall while a new building was constructed. The new library, named for Gladys E. Kelly, opened in 2018.

== Notable people ==
- Andrew J. Bates (1839–1915), industrialist and founder of the Bates Shoe Company
- Bette Boucher (born 1943), retired professional wrestler
- William Slater Brown (1896–1997), novelist, biographer, and translator of French literature
- Stasia Czernicki (1922–1993), professional candlepin bowler
- George Derby (1857–1925), professional baseball player
- Gene Filipski (1931–1994), professional football player
- Frank Gilmore (1864–1929), professional baseball player
- George R. Stobbs (1877–1966), member of the United States House of Representatives
- Mike Sullivan (1860–1929), professional baseball player
- Lyman T. Tingier (1862–1920), Lieutenant Governor of Connecticut
- Members of the Slater family

== See also ==
- Webster (CDP), Massachusetts, the census-designated place
- Civil War Memorial (Webster, Massachusetts)
- List of mill towns in Massachusetts
