= Economy of Malta =

Highly industrialised service-based economy

- Currency: Euro (EUR, €) (Note: Before 1 January 2008: Maltese lira)
- Fiscal year: Calendar year
- Trade organisations: EU, WTO and the OSCE
- Country group: Advanced economy; High-income economy

Statistics
- Population: ▲588,254 (1 January 2026)
- GDP: ▲$22.7 billion (nominal, 2024); ▲$36.9 billion (PPP, 2024)
- GDP rank: 118th (nominal, 2024); 140th (PPP, 2024)
- GDP growth: ▲8.1% (2022); ▲5.6% (2023f); ▲5.0% (2024f)
- GDP per capita: ▲$41,738 (nominal, 2024); ▲$67,682 (PPP, 2024)
- GDP per capita rank: 25th (nominal, 2024); 20th (PPP, 2024)
- GDP by sector: agriculture: 1.4%; industry: 11.4%; services: 87.2%; (2015 est.)
- Inflation (CPI): 0.8% (2020 est.); 1.5% (2019); 1.7% (2018)
- Population below national poverty line: 15.1% (2012); ▲20.2% at risk of poverty or social exclusion (AROPE, 2019)
- Gini coefficient: ▼28.0 low (2019, Eurostat)
- Human Development Index: ▼0.915 very high (2022) (25th); ▼0.837 very high IHDI (23rd) (2022)
- Corruption Perceptions Index: ▼55 out of 100 points (2023) (51st)
- Labour force: ▼226,582 (2019); ▲81.7% employment rate (2023)
- Labour force by occupation: Public Administration: 26.6%; Trade, Transport, Accommodation & Food: 28.6%; Manufacturing & Industry: 15.7%; Professional, Scientific & Technical: 7.7%; Construction: 5.6%; Financial & Insurance: 4.4%; Agriculture & Fishing: 1.6%; Information & Communication: 3.5%; Other Services: 5.6%; (2014 est.)
- Unemployment: ▼4.1% (August 2020); ▼8.7% youth unemployment (2018)
- Average gross salary: €1,829 monthly (Q3 2023)
- Average net salary: €1,416 monthly (Q3 2023)
- Main industries: Tourism, electronics, ship building and repair, construction, food and beverages, pharmaceuticals, footwear, clothing, tobacco, aviation services, financial services, information technology services

External
- Exports: ▲$4.87 billion (2022 est.)
- Export goods: Machinery and mechanical appliances, mineral fuels, oils and products, pharmaceutical products, printed books and newspapers, aircraft and parts, toys, games and sports equipment
- Main export partners: Germany 16.84%; Japan 7.67%; France 7.56%; Italy 5.47%; Singapore 5.27% (2022)
- Imports: ▲$15.7 billion (2022 est.)
- Import goods: Mineral fuels, oils and products, electrical machinery, aircraft and parts, machinery and mechanical appliances, plastic and other semi-manufactured goods, vehicles and parts
- Main import partners: Italy 22.32%; Canada 9.42%; France 6.57%; Spain 5.65%; Germany 5.08% (2022)
- FDI stock: ▲$2.03 billion (2017)
- Gross external debt: ▲$5.241 billion (2013 est.)

Public finance
- Government debt: ▲9,767 billion 50,3% of GDP (2023)
- Foreign reserves: ▲$928 million (October 2020)
- Budget balance: 950,4 million deficit (2023); -4,89% of GDP (2023)
- Revenue: 6,481 billion 33.4% of GDP (2023)
- Spending: 7,431 billion 38.3% of GDP (2023)
- Economic aid: €855 million from European Structural and Investment Funds (2007–2013); €828 million from European Structural and Investment Funds (2014–2020)
- Credit rating: Standard & Poor's: BBB+ (Domestic); BBB+ (Foreign); AAA (T&C Assessment); Outlook: Stable; Moody's: A3; Outlook: Positive; Fitch: A; Outlook: Stable; Scope Ratings: A+; Outlook: Stable
- All values, unless otherwise stated, are in US dollars.

The economy of Malta is a highly industrialised service-based economy. It is classified as an advanced economy by the International Monetary Fund and is considered a high-income country by the World Bank and an innovation-driven economy by the World Economic Forum. It is a member of the European Union and of the eurozone, having formally adopted the euro on 1 January 2008.

The strengths of Malta's economy are its advantageous location, being situated in the middle of the Mediterranean Sea at a crossroads between Europe, North Africa and the Middle East, its fully developed open market economy, multilingual population (88% of Maltese people speak English), productive labour force, low corporate tax and well developed finance and ICT clusters. The economy is dependent on foreign trade, manufacturing (especially electronics), tourism and other services in the tertiary sector of the economy. In 2014, over 1.7 million tourists visited the island.

Malta's GDP per capita in 2024, adjusted by purchasing power parity, stood at $67,682 and ranked 15th in the list of EU countries in terms of purchasing power standard. In the 2013 calendar year, Malta recorded a budget deficit of 2.7%, which is within the limits for eurozone countries imposed by the Maastricht criteria, and Government gross debt of 69.8%. At 5.9%, Malta had the sixth-lowest unemployment rate in the EU in 2015.

Malta is the 33rd-most democratic country in the world according to the Economist Intelligence Unit's Democracy Index with an upper-middle score on V-Dem's Democracy Indices.

== History ==
In the mid-thirteenth century, Abate Giliberto indicated that the population of the Maltese islands consisted of 1,119 families. At the time, Maltese agriculture transitioned from subsistence agriculture to a more commerce-based one through the cultivation for export of cotton and cumin, which were introduced during the Arab period. As a result, there was a need to import food from neighbouring Sicily. Eventually, in the late fourteenth century, cotton production became the principal agricultural product in the archipelago, since it was one of the few production hubs in the western Mediterranean. Processing cotton to weave it into the fabric was a labour-intensive activity, so the boost in cotton trade led to the population surging to 33,000. In an exploratory mission in 1524, the Knights of St. John noted how the islands were dependent on grain imports since agriculture was dedicated to the production of cotton, honey and cumin. By the late 18th century, cotton was Malta’s principal cash crop and occupied most of the islands’ farmland.

During the Napoleonic Wars (1800–1815), Malta's economy prospered and became the focal point of a major trading system. In 1808, two-thirds of the cargo consigned from Malta went to Levant and Egypt. Later, one half of the cargo was usually destined for Trieste. Cargo consisted of largely British and colonial-manufactured goods. Malta's economy became prosperous from this trade and many artisans, such as weavers, found new jobs in the port industry.

In 1820, during the Battle of Navarino, which took place in Greece, the British fleet was based in Malta. In 1839, P&O and East India Company used Malta as a calling port on their Egypt and Levant runs.

In 1869, the opening of the Suez Canal benefited Malta's economy greatly as there was a massive increase in the shipping which entered in the port. The economy had entered a special phase. The Mediterranean Sea became the "world highway of trade" and a number of ships called at Malta for coal and various supplies on their way to the Indian Ocean and the Far East. From 1871 to 1881, about 8,000 workers found jobs in the Malta docks and a number of banks opened in Malta. By 1882, Malta reached the height of its prosperity.

However, the boom did not last long. By the end of the 19th century, the economy began declining and by the 1940s, Malta's economy was in serious crisis. This was primarily due to the invention of large ships which had become oil-fired and therefore had no need to stop in the Grand Harbor of Malta to refuel. The British Government had to extend the dockyard.

At the end of World War II, Malta's strategic importance had reached a low point. Modern air warfare technology and the invention of the atomic bomb had changed the importance of the military base. The British lost control of the Suez Canal and withdrew from the naval dockyard, transforming it for commercial shipbuilding and ship repair purposes.

== Overview ==
The Maltese economy is dependent on foreign trade, manufacturing (especially electronics and pharmaceuticals), and tourism. Malta adopted the Euro currency on 1 January 2008.

Tourist arrivals and foreign exchange earnings derived from tourism have steadily increased since 1987. Following the September 11 attacks, the tourist industry suffered a temporary setback. With the help of a favorable international economic climate, the availability of domestic resources, and industrial policies that support foreign export-oriented investment, the economy has been able to sustain a period of rapid growth. Growing public and private sector demand for credit has led — in the context of interest rate controls — to credit rationing to the private sector and the introduction of non-interest charges by banks. Despite these pressures, consumer price inflation has remained low (2.2% according to the Central Bank of Malta in 2007), reflecting the impact of a fixed exchange rate policy (100% hard peg to the euro, in preparation for currency changeover) and lingering price controls.

There is a strong manufacturing base for high value-added products like electronics and pharmaceuticals, and the manufacturing sector has more than 250 foreign-owned, export-oriented enterprises. Tourism generates around 15% of GDP. Film production in Malta is another growing industry (approx. 35 million euros between 1997 and 2011), despite stiff competition from other film locations in Eastern Europe and North Africa, with the Malta Film Commission providing support services to foreign film companies for the production of feature cinema, commercials and television series.

From 2001 to 2005 the mean GDP real growth was 0.4% due to Malta losing pace in tourism and other industries. Unemployment was down to 4.4%, its lowest level in 3 years. Many formerly state-owned companies are being privatised—and the market liberalised.

Fiscal policy has been directed toward bringing down the budget deficit after public debt grew from a negative figure in 1988 to 56% in 1999 and 69.1% in 2009. By 2007, the deficit-to-GDP ratio was comfortably below 3% as required for eurozone membership, but due to pre-election spending has gone up to 4.4% in 2008 and 3.8% in 2009.

== Economic sectors ==
=== Industry ===
Average annual employment and average annual earnings in manufacturing industry (2007)
Sector	Average annual employment	Average annual earnings per capita in euros
Food and beverages; tobacco	2,873	13,441
Textiles and textile products	422	15,512
Wearing apparel and clothes	733	11,698
Leather and leather products	185	9,308
Wood and wood products	78	12,000
Paper and paper products	265	15,698
Publishing and printing	1,669	17,615
Chemicals and chemical products	1,038	19,052
Rubber and plastic products	1,578	15,254
Other non-metallic mineral products	766	11,928
Fabricated metal products	596	14,451
Machinery and equipment n.e.c.	446	13,518
Electrical machinery and apparatus	1,409	16,515
Radio, TV and communication equipment	3,168	18,673
Medical, precision and optical instruments	877	15,582
Motor vehicles, trailers and semitrailers	50	10,220
Other transport equipment	258	20,938
Furniture and manufacturing n.e.c.	1,597	15,753
Total	18,008	15,812

=== Banking ===
Largest banks in Malta, 2022
Rank	Company	Founded	Market %
1	Bank of Valletta	1974	44.67 %
2	HSBC Bank Malta p.l.c.	1999	20.48 %
3	APS BANK P.L.C.	1910	8.41 %
4	MeDirect Bank (Malta) plc	2004	6.87 %
5	FIMBank plc	1995	5.70 %
6	Lombard Bank Malta plc	1955	3.85 %
7	BNF Bank plc	2008	3.13 %

=== Agriculture ===
Agriculture constitutes a relatively small proportion of the GDP of Malta, at around 0.7%. The country produces a diverse range of crops, including potatoes, olives, and tomatoes. Animal livestock within Malta include cattle, goat, pigs and poultry.

== Infrastructure ==
=== Transport ===
Malta has an airport, Luqa International Airport, and two majors ports, Malta Freeport and Valletta Cruise Port. Malta Freeport is used for all cargo ships and imports-exports while Valletta Cruise Port is only used by cruise ships. The Malta Freeport reported revenues of 170 million euros, while €90 million came from the Valletta Cruise Port, totaling €260 million. The Freeport connects Malta with 110 others ports in the world including 55 in the Mediterranean. Furthermore, 2,189 container ships carried 2.80 million TEU of container traffic in and out of Malta Freeport in 2022. The Valletta Cruise Port welcomed 900,000 passengers in 2023, contributing €53 million to the Maltese economy.

Luqa International Airport serves 35 different airlines with 115 destinations. In 2023, 7.8 million people travelled through the airport, providing $2.7 billion in revenues to the Maltese economy, equivalent to 24% of Malta's Gross Domestic Product (GDP). Specifically, the former air flag carrier of Malta Air Malta, KM Malta Airlines since 2024, had a revenue of €679.4 million in 2022. Another new airline operating from Luqa Airport, Universal Air, started operations in April 2024 with a fleet of 6 aircraft. The airlines, airport, and surrounding businesses employ almost 7,000 people.

=== Energy ===
Despite a great potential for solar and wind power, Malta produces almost all its electricity from oil, importing 100% of it. Energy and the cost of energy, which is oft-quoted as the highest in Europe, was a key issue in the 2013 election.

== International trade ==
Exports of Malta by product category (2019) Chemical products Transportation Machines Mineral products Plastics and rubbers Metals Foodstuffs Precious metals Textiles Instruments Animal products Vegetable products Paper goods Footwear and headwear Miscellaneous Stone and glass Wood products Animal and vegetable bi-products Animal hides Arts and antiques Weapons

Malta's principal merchandise exports include integrated circuits, banknotes and other printed securities, pharmaceuticals and refined petroleum products. In 2023, the country exported US$3.5 billion worth of goods, with Germany, Japan, Italy and Hong Kong as its largest identified export markets.

Merchandise imports amounted to US$8.4 billion in 2023. Major imports included refined petroleum products, motorboats, integrated circuits, aircraft and pharmaceuticals. Italy, Germany, France, Spain and the Netherlands were Malta's largest import partners.

== Labour market and social welfare ==
=== Poverty ===
Poverty and social exclusion are significant problems in Malta. As of 2008, an estimate of 15% of Malta's citizens were living below the poverty line, which was slightly better than the EU average of 17% at the time. To address the issue of poverty, on 24 December 2014 Malta addressed poverty in the six branches of social services, health and environment, culture, income and social benefits, education and employment, by unveiling the National Strategic Policy for Poverty Reduction and Social Inclusion; this will stay in effect from 2014 to 2024. Under this policy, stakeholders will be involved in the discussion of how to reduce hardships experienced by families living in Malta.

=== Unemployment benefits ===
Benefits for unemployment are given out based on contributory and non-contributory schemes. Contributory schemes distribute unemployment benefits within 50 weeks of contribution. Non-contributory schemes a Social Unemployment Benefit is granted after a means test to the head of a household. In order to qualify for unemployment benefits, a person must be able to do work and have registered as unemployed.

There are three categories to the Malta registrar of unemployment. People who have never worked fall into category one. Those who quit or were dismissed from their jobs fall into category two. Category three is for people who are currently employed but are looking for other job prospects. Benefits for unemployment are given for 156 days after which a person may qualify for the means tested unemployment assistance. People eligible for unemployment benefits are Maltese citizens who are aged sixteen years or older, people signed up for eligible work-study programs, and citizens outside of Malta who are employed by foreign entities.

Some scholars have noted that Malta's unemployment system has created a dependency on the benefits provided by the system. From 1992 to 2005, there was an increase in the number of recipients of both short-term and long-term benefits. Additionally, in 2016, 969 Maltese citizens were cut off the employment register for abusing the system. For these reasons, there has been movements from politicians to reduce and reshape the unemployment system. After the election of the Labour Party in 2013, the number of people receiving unemployment benefits dropped by 75%. This same government introduced the "in-work" benefit which forces more people to work while helping the most poor and desperate.

In order to be eligible for in-work benefit, applicants must first have children under the age of 23, and from that point, benefits vary depending on marital status and the number of people employed per family. For a single parent in employment who earns between €6,600-€16,500, they are eligible for a maximum payable rate of up to €1,250 annually per child. For a married couple whose collective income is between €10,000 and is less than €24,000 (the income of one of the spouses must be over €3,000), they are eligible for a maximum payment rate of up to €1,200 annually per child. In 2016, the in-work benefit was extended to married couples where only one parent works, extending the benefit to an additional 3,700 families. For a married couple with only one parent gainfully employed whose income is greater than €6,600 and less than €16,500, they are eligible for a maximum payable rate of up to €350 yearly per child. The in-work benefit is paid quarterly in January, April, July, and October.

At 42.3% in 2017, female workforce participation rate in Malta is relatively low. For over half of Maltese women who stay out of the workforce altogether, they do not receive direct unemployment benefits. Rather, most unemployment benefits are given to men because to receive unemployment benefits, one must first be employed. However, because older women tend to stay out of the workforce, those women who do participate in the workforce tend to be younger and have higher levels of education. This has led to a lower long-term unemployment rate amongst women than men. In 2011, the long-term unemployment rate of women was 2.5% while the long-term unemployment rate of men was 3.3%.

=== Pensions ===
Malta has public and private pension systems. There are two types of contributions for the public pension system: class one and class two. Employed people contribute to class one and those are self-employed contribute to class two. There was a gradual increase in pension age in Malta in the 1950s and 1960s; for example, someone who was born in 1953 needs to be 62 years old in order to collect pensions while another person born in 1960 would have to be 64 years old in order to collect pensions. Another requirement to qualify for a Malta pension program is that a person must have been contributing to the program for a certain time period or they will not be eligible. In Malta there is a state Malta Retirement Programme for foreign pensioners. According to the programme, a foreigner whose income is more than 75% from pension payments, can receive a residence permit in the country and a special tax status.

== Companies ==
According to HitHorizons, companies registered in Malta generate €88,255,174,701 in sales per annum. The company with the highest sales is ALKAGESTA LTD with €2.075B followed by HC TRADING MALTA LIMITED and ADVAITA TRADE PRIVATE LIMITED with €1.346B and €1.253B in sales respectively.

== Statistics ==
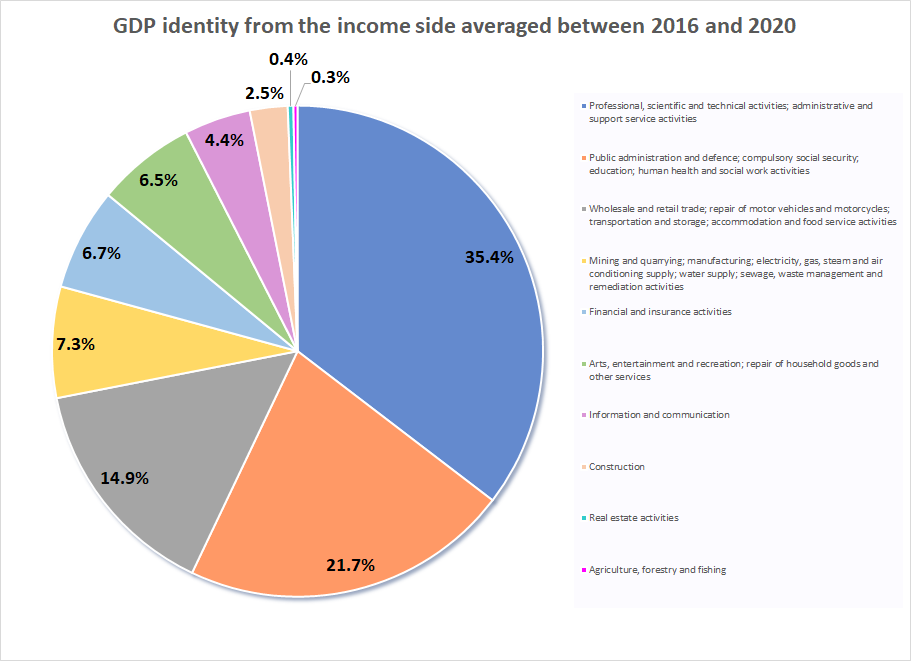
GDP identity from the income side: Percentage compensation of employees by industry averaged for the period 2016 to 2020. (NSO, Gross Domestic Product: 2020 report.)

Electricity - production: 1,620 GWh (1998)

Electricity - production by source:
fossil fuel: 98.6%
hydro: 0%
nuclear: 0%
Renewable sources: 1.4%
other: 0% (1998)

Electricity - consumption: 1,507 GWh (1998)

Electricity - exports: 0 kWh (1998)

Electricity - imports: 0 kWh (1998)

Agriculture - products: potatoes, cauliflower, grapes, wheat, barley, tomatoes, citrus, cut flowers, green peppers; pork, milk, poultry, eggs

Currency: 1 euro = 100 cents since 1 January 2008
previously 1 Maltese lira = 100 cents;

Exchange rates: Maltese liri (LM) per US$1 – 0.4086 (January 2000), 0.3994 (1999), 0.3885 (1998), 0.3857 (1997), 0.3604 (1996), 0.3529 (1995) Irrevocably fixed conversion rate to the euro: Maltese liri (LM) per EUR1 - 0.4293 (2007)

== See also ==
- History of banking in Malta
- Tourism in Malta
- List of companies of Malta
- Agriculture in Malta
- Economy of Europe
- General Retailers and Traders Union
