= List of banks in Malta =

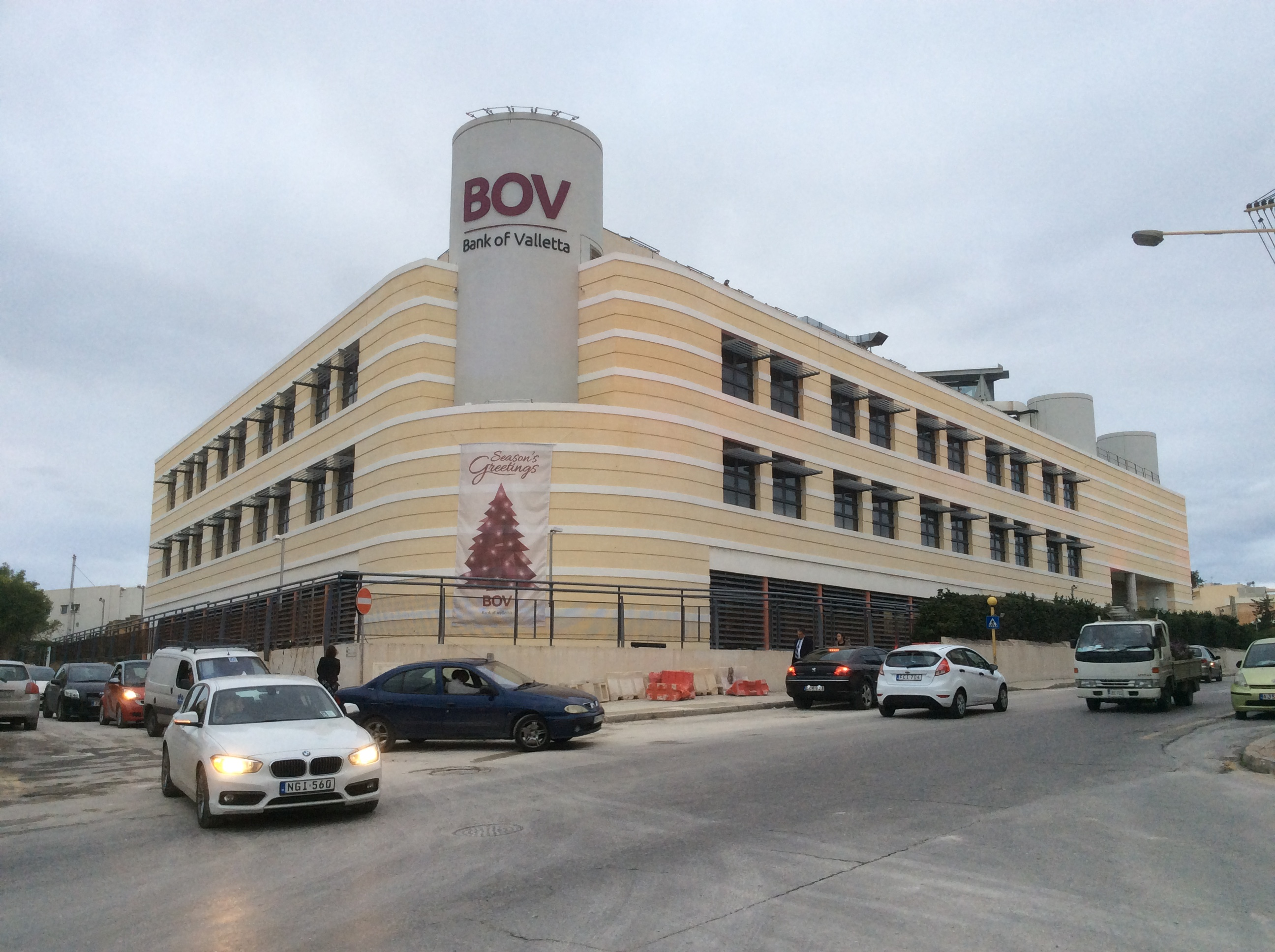
Bank of Valletta head office, Santa Venera

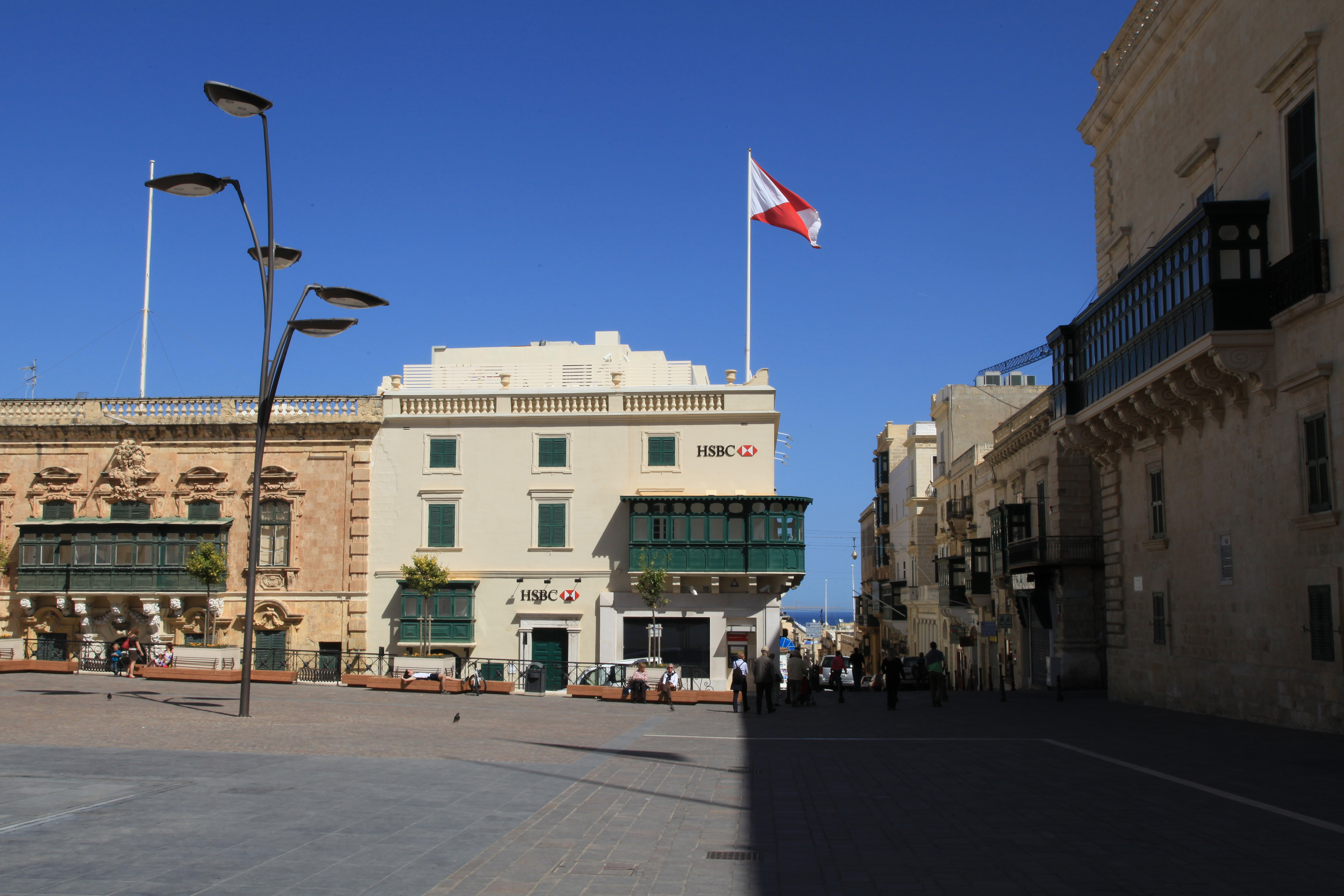
HSBC Malta head office, Valletta

The following list of banks in Malta is to be understood within the framework of the European single market and European banking union, which means that Malta's banking system is more open to cross-border banking operations than peers outside of the EU.

== Policy framework ==
European banking supervision distinguishes between significant institutions (SIs) and less significant institutions (LSIs), with SI/LSI designations updated regularly by the European Central Bank (ECB). Significant institutions are directly supervised by the ECB using joint supervisory teams that involve the national competent authorities (NCAs) of individual participating countries. Less significant institutions are supervised by the relevant NCA on a day-to-day basis, under the supervisory oversight of the ECB. In the case of Malta, the NCA is the Malta Financial Services Authority.

== Significant institutions ==
As of 1 September 2025, the ECB had two Maltese banking groups in its list of significant institutions:

- Bank of Valletta plc
- MDB Group Ltd

A study published in 2024 estimated that, as of end-2023, Bank of Valletta had €14.5 billion assets in Malta, followed by HSBC Bank Malta with €7.7 billion and MDB Group with €5 billion. Since then, HSBC has sold its Maltese subsidiary to Athens-based CrediaBank, and MDB has been separately acquired by Prague-based Banka Creditas. No other SIs based in the euro area have subsidiaries in Malta.

== Less significant institutions ==
As of 1 September 2025, the ECB's list of supervised institutions included 18 Maltese LSIs.

=== High-impact LSIs ===
Of these, three were designated by the ECB as "high-impact" on the basis of several criteria including size:

- APS Bank plc
- FIMBank plc
- Lombard Bank Malta plc

=== Other Maltese LSIs ===
The other 11 domestic Maltese LSI were:

- Banasino Investments Ltd (in Cyprus), owner of ECCM Bank
  - ECCM Bank plc
- FCM Bank Ltd
- Izola Bank plc
- Lidion Holding plc
  - Lidion Bank plc, subsidiary of Lidion Holding
- Merkanti Bank Ltd
- Multitude Bank plc
- Novum Bank Ltd
- Sparkasse (Holdings) Malta Ltd, owned by Anteilsverwaltungssparkasse Schwaz (parent of Sparkasse Schwaz) in Austria
  - Sparkasse Bank Malta plc, subsidiary of Sparkasse (Holdings) Malta

=== Non-euro-area-controlled LSIs ===
Based on the same ECB list, four Maltese LSIs were affiliates of financial groups based outside the euro area:

- (Nigeria) Access Group Malta Holdings Ltd, subsidiary of Access Bank Group
  - Access Bank Malta Ltd, subsidiary of Access Group Malta Holdings Ltd
- BNF Bank plc, subsidiary of Qatar-based Al Faisal International for Investment
- (United States) IIG Bank (Malta) Ltd, subsidiary of IIG Capital

== Third-country branches ==
As of 13 October 2025, (Turkey) Akbank was the only banking group established outside the European Economic Area with a branch in Malta.

== Other institutions ==
The Central Bank of Malta and Malta Development Bank are public credit institutions that do not hold a banking license under EU law.

== Defunct banks ==
The following former Maltese banks are documented on Wikipedia in English, listed in chronological order of establishment:

- Nemea Bank (2008-2017)
- Pilatus Bank (2014-2018)

== See also ==
- Economy of Malta
- History of banking in Malta
- List of banks in the euro area
- List of banks in Europe
