= List of banks in the Czech Republic =

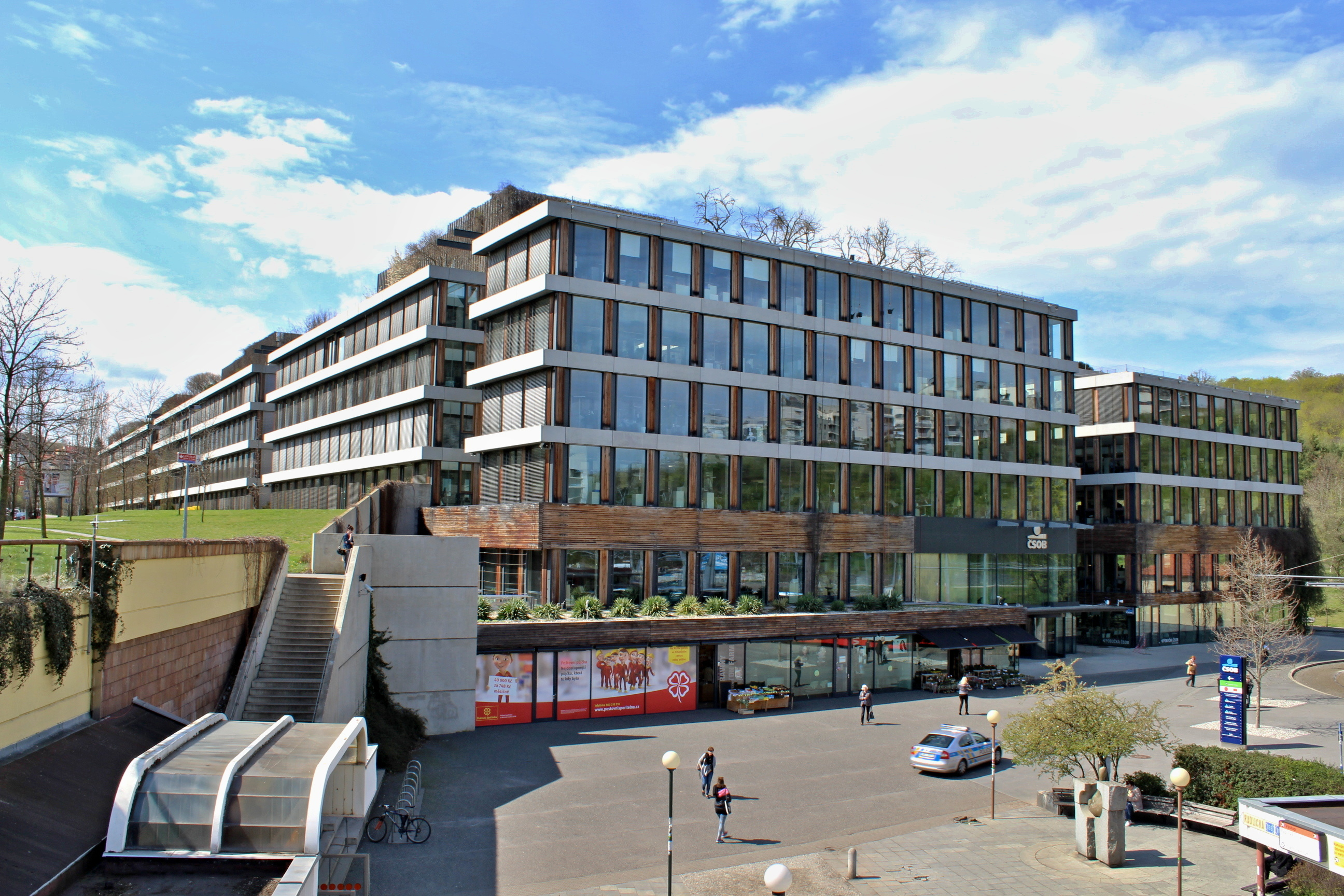
ČSOB head office, Prague

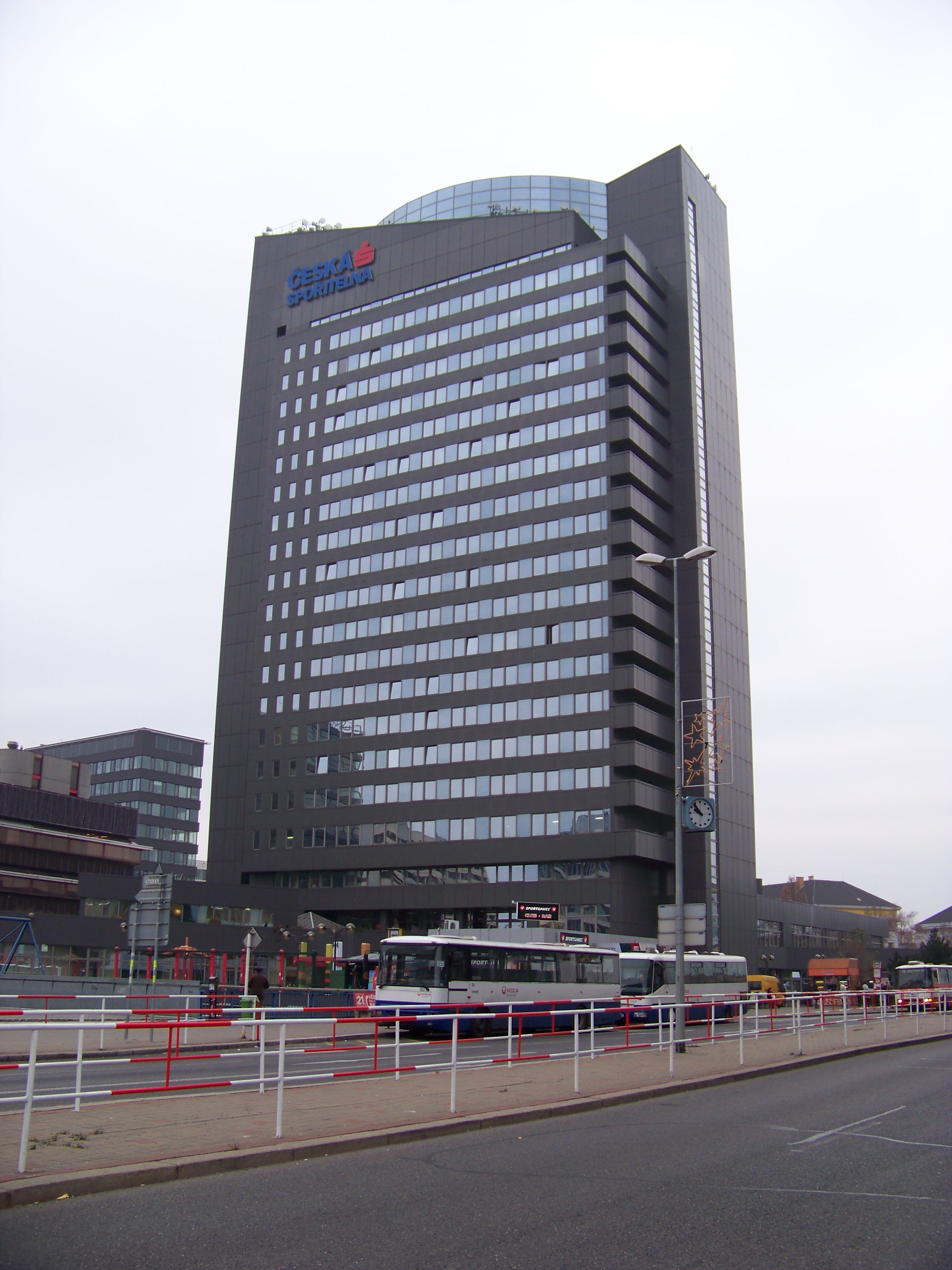
Česká Spořitelna head office, Prague

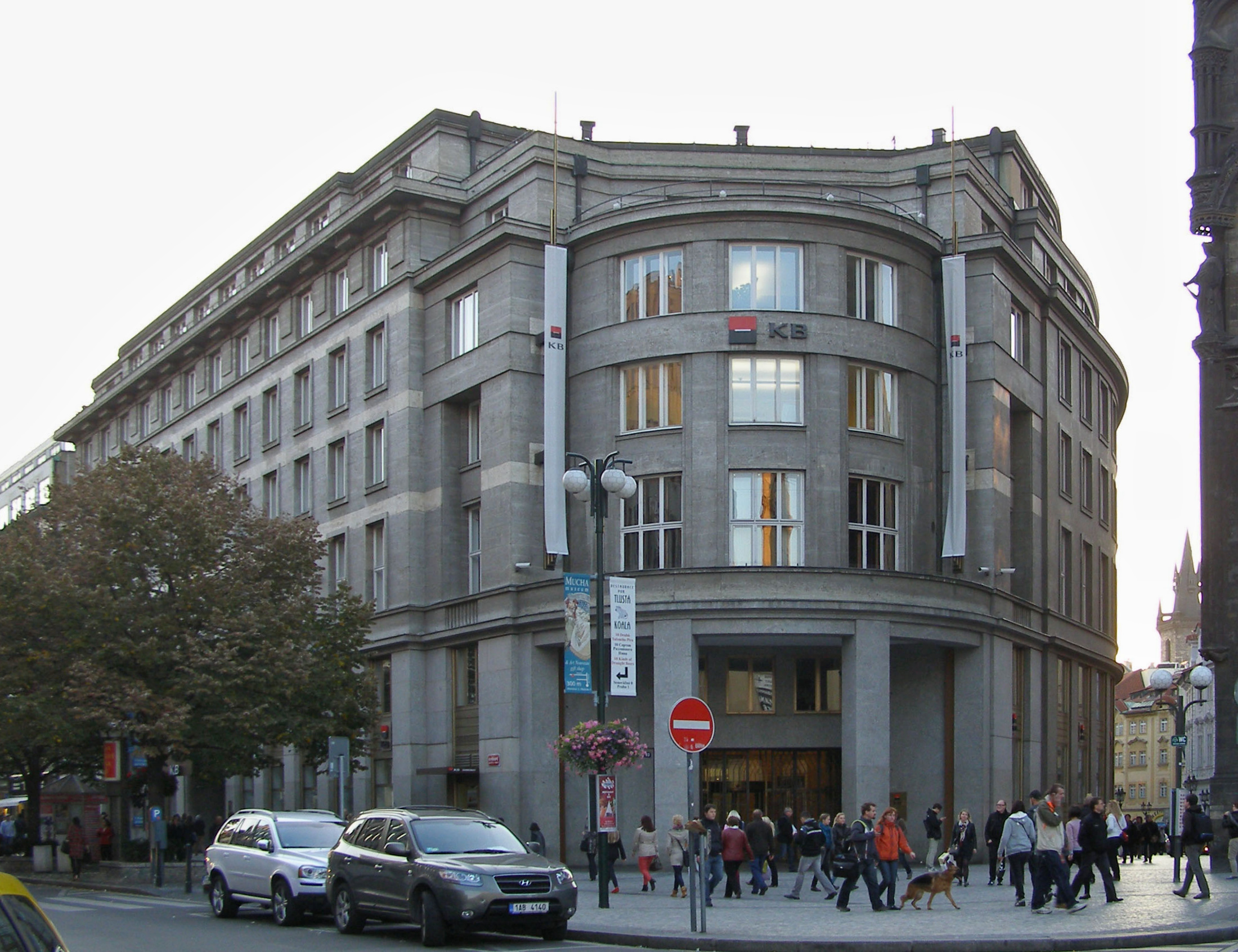
Komerční Banka head office, Prague

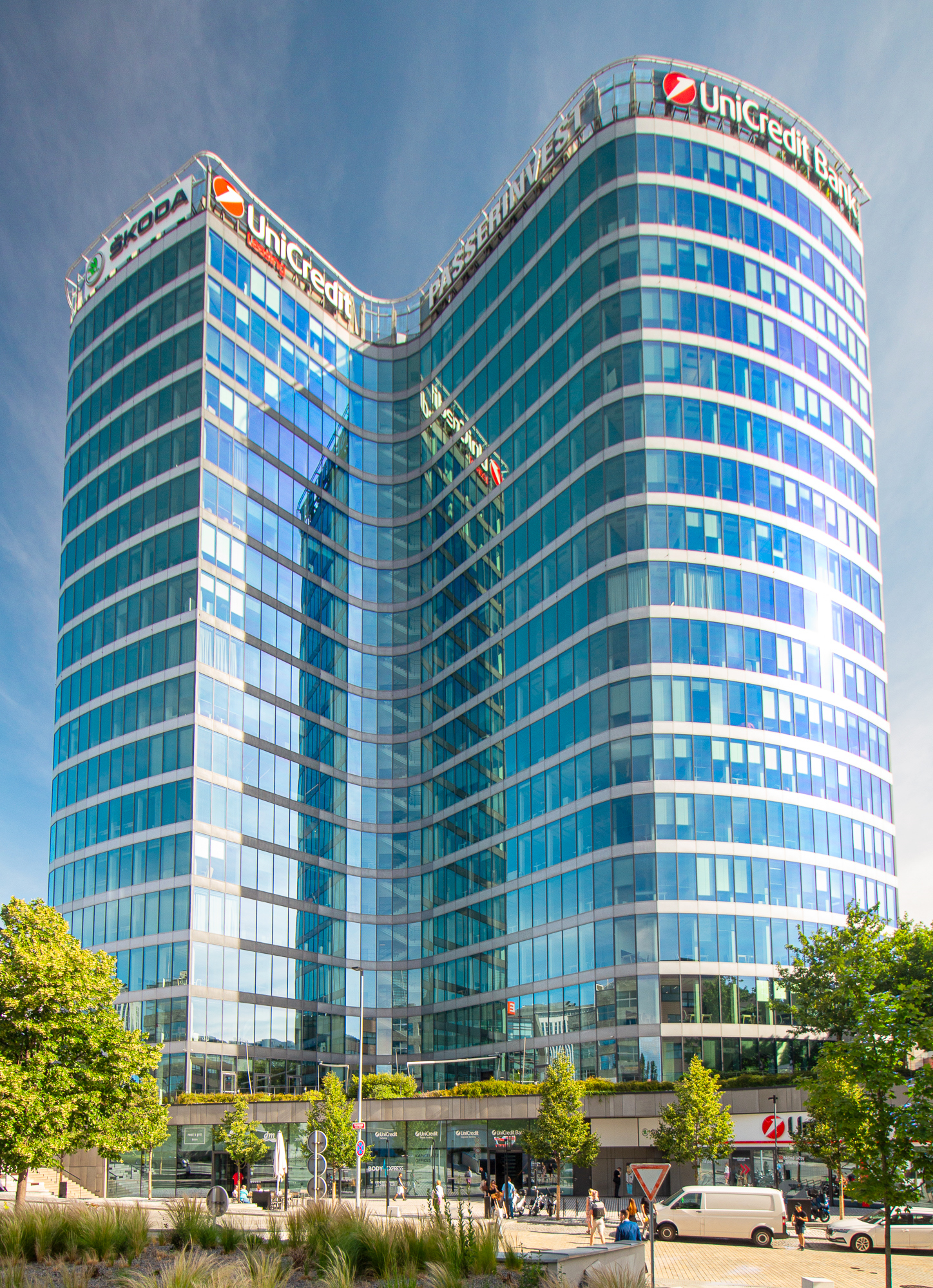
UniCredit Bank Czech Republic and Slovakia head office, Prague

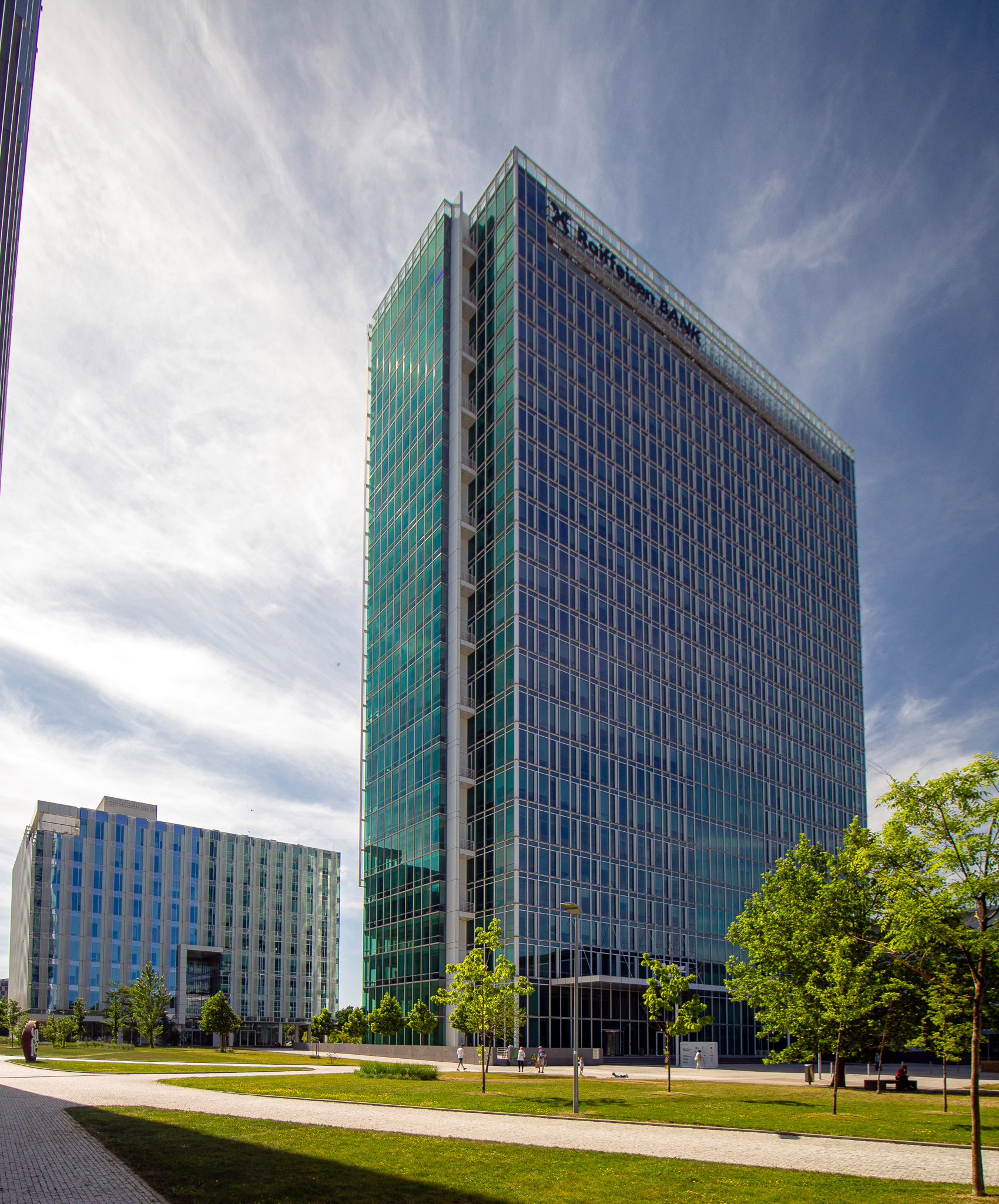
Raiffeisenbank head office, Prague

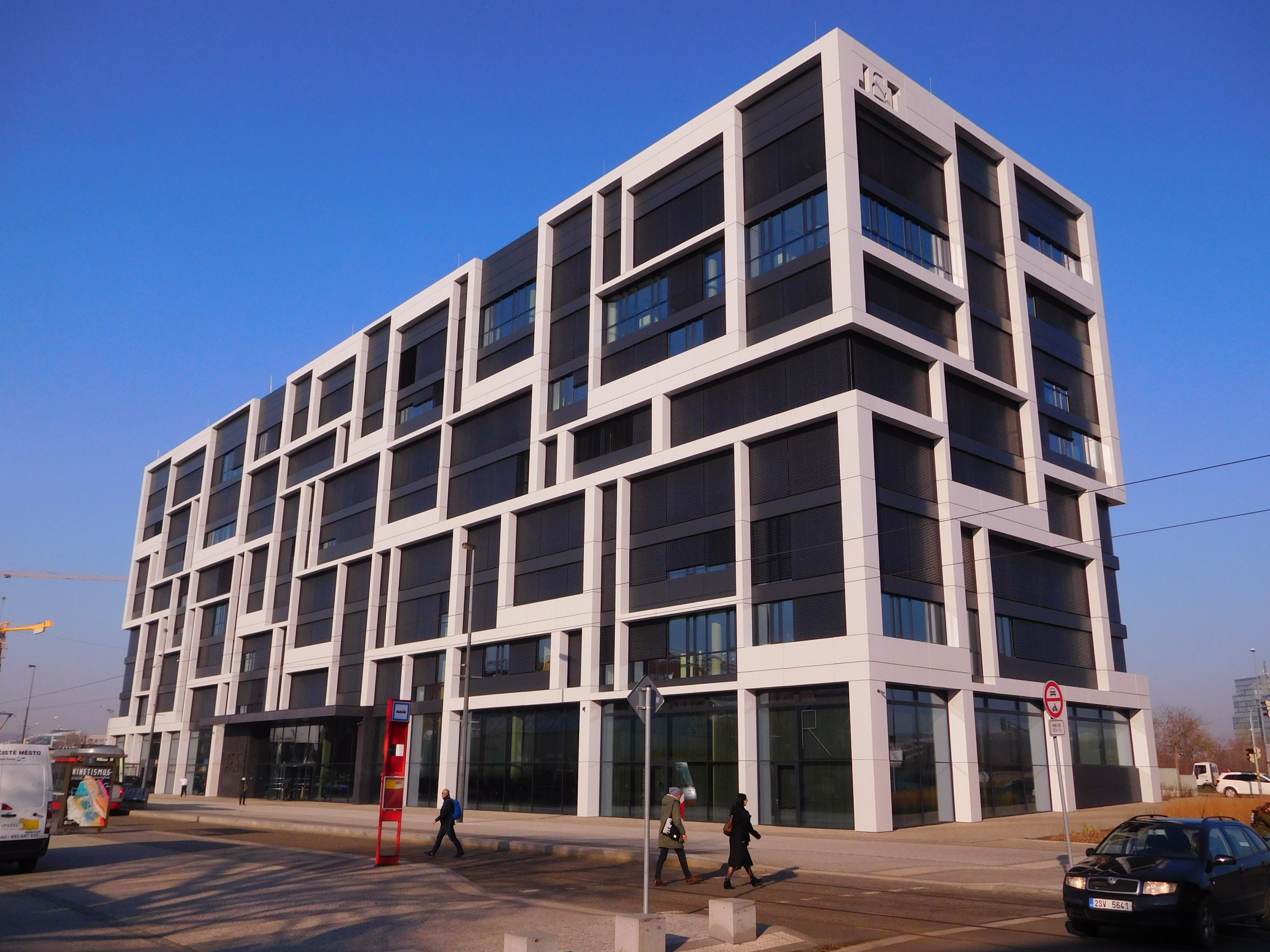
J&T Finance Group head office, Prague

The following list of banks in the Czech Republic is to be understood within the framework of the European single market, which means that the Czech Republic's banking system is more open to cross-border banking operations than peers outside of the European Union.

The Czech National Bank (ČNB) is the country's banking supervisor.

== Systemically important banks ==
As of 2026, the following Czech banks were designated as systemically important, listed here by decreasing score of systemic importance:

- Československá Obchodní Banka, a.s. (ČSOB), subsidiary of KBC Group (Belgium)
- Česká Spořitelna, a.s., subsidiary of Erste Group (Austria)
- Komerční Banka, a.s., subsidiary of Société Générale (France)
- UniCredit Bank CZ and SK, a.s., subsidiary of UniCredit (Italy)
- Raiffeisenbank, a.s., subsidiary of Raiffeisen Bank International (Austria)

== Other commercial banks ==
In addition to the above, the list of banks maintained by the ČNB indicated the following banks as of 13 November 2026:

- Air Bank a.s., majority-owned by PPF
- Banka Creditas a.s.
- ČSOB Hypoteční banka, a.s., subsidiary of ČSOB (Belgium)
- ČSOB Stavební spořitelna, a.s., subsidiary of ČSOB (Belgium)
- Česká exportní banka, a.s. (state-owned)
- Fio banka, a.s.
- J&T Banka
- Moneta Money Bank, 30-percent-owned by PPF
- Moneta Stavební Spořitelna, a.s., subsidiary of Moneta Money Bank
- Modrá pyramida stavební spořitelna, a.s.
- Národní Rozvojová Banka, a.s., a state-owned policy bank
- Partners Banka, a.s.
- PPF banka a.s.
- Raiffeisen stavební spořitelna a.s., subsidiary of Raiffeisenbank (Austria)
- Stavební spořitelna České spořitelny, a.s., subsidiary of Česká Spořitelna (Austria)
- Trinity Bank a.s.

== Credit unions ==
Also as of 13 November 2026, the ČNB's list featured three credit unions (Czech: spořitelní družstvo):

- Artesa Credit Union
- Citfin Credit Union
- Peněžní Dům Credit Union

== Branches ==
=== EEA branches ===
Also as of 13 November 2026, the following credit institutions established in the European Economic Area (EEA) operated a branch in the Czech Republic:

- (Estonia) AS Inbank
- (France) BNP Paribas SA
- (Austria) Bank Gutmann AG
- (Hungary) Bank of China (CEE) Ltd, subsidiary of Bank of China
- (Luxembourg) Banking Circle SA, controlled by EQT AB (Sweden)
- (Germany) Commerzbank AG
- (Republic of Ireland) Citibank Europe plc, subsidiary of Citigroup (United States)
- (Germany) Deutsche Bank AG
- (Malta) FCM Bank
- (France) HSBC Continental Europe, subsidiary of HSBC (United Kingdom)
- (Netherlands) ING Bank NV
- (Poland) mBank SA, subsidiary of Commerzbank (Germany)
- (Austria) Oberbank AG
- (Austria) Partner Bank AG
- (Slovakia) Penta Bank
- (Poland) PKO BP SA
- (Slovakia) Privatbanka a.s., subsidiary of Penta Investments (Slovakia)
- (Germany) SMBC Bank EU AG, subsidiary of SMBC Group (Japan)
- (Denmark) Saxo Bank A/S
- (Germany) Volksbank Raiffeisenbank Nordoberpfalz eG
- (Slovakia) Všeobecná úverová banka a.s., subsidiary of Intesa Sanpaolo (Italy)

=== Third-country branches ===
As of 13 October 2025, the following banks established outside the European Economic Area had branches in the Czech Republic ("third-country branches" in EU parlance):

- (China) Bank of Communications Co., Ltd.
- Industrial and Commercial Bank of China Ltd

== Defunct banks ==
- České Budějovice City Savings Bank (1856-1948)
- Böhmische Escompte-Bank (1863-1945)
- Czech Mortgage Bank (1865-1945)
- Economic Credit Bank for the Czechs (1867-1921)
- Živnostenská Banka (1868-1950)
- Prague Credit Bank (1870-1930)
- Böhmische Union Bank (1872-1945)
- Moravské Budějovice CIty Savings Bank (1875-1948)
- Zemská Banka (1890-1948)
- Böhmische Industriebank (1898-1943)
- Legiobanka (1919-1948)
- Czech Commercial Bank (1921-1930)
- Anglo-Czechoslovak Bank (1922-1930)
- National Bank of Czechoslovakia (1926-1939 and 1945-1950)
- Anglo-Czechoslovak and Prague Credit Bank (1930-1948)
- State Bank of Czechoslovakia (1950-1993)
- Agrobanka (1990-1998)
- eBanka (1990-2008)
- Max Banka (1991-2024)
- Union Banka (1991-2003)
- Equa Bank (1993-2021)
- Investiční a Poštovní Banka (1993-2000)
- Sberbank CZ (1993-2022)

== See also ==
- List of banks in Europe
