= Lombard Bank =

Bank in Malta

Lombard Bank Malta Plc
- Type: Public
- Traded as: MSE: LOM
- Founded: 1955
- Headquarters: 67, Republic Street, Valletta, Malta
- Net income: €4.35 mln (2014)
- Total assets: €0.676 bln (2014)
- Website: www.lombardmalta.com

Lombard Bank Malta Plc is one of Malta's major banks, together with Bank of Valletta, HSBC Bank Malta and APS Bank. The Government of Malta through the National Development and Social Fund (NDSF) owns 49.1% of the bank. It acquired these shares from the now defunct Cyprus Popular Bank. Over 1,200 shareholders, and investment funds, hold the remaining shares. The bank has a 71.5% stake in MaltaPost plc., the Maltese national postal operator.

== Branches ==
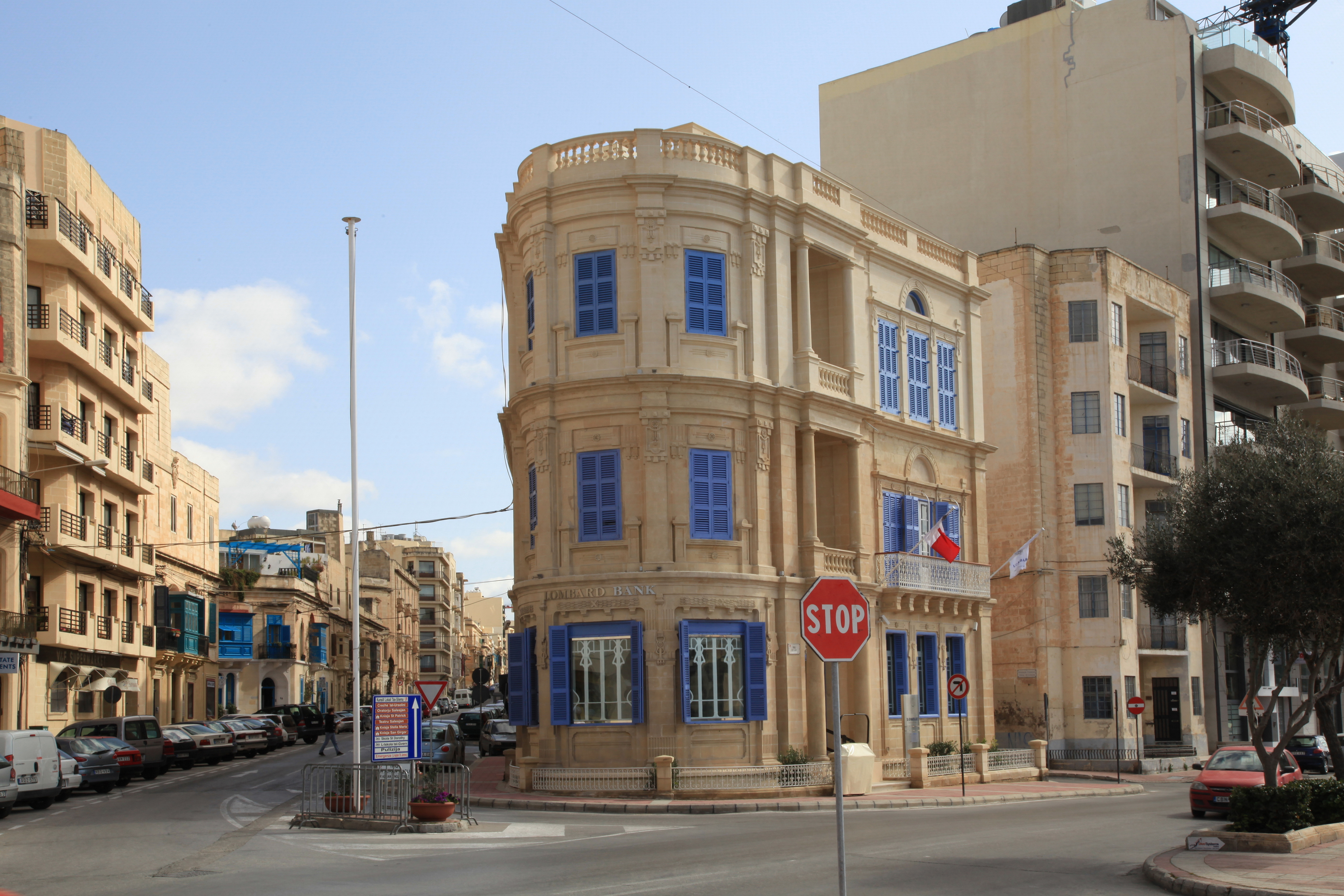
Lombard Bank branch at 225 Tower Road in Sliema

The bank operates a network of seven branches in Malta and Gozo, with its head office at Spinola Palace in 67 Republic Street, Valletta. The branches are located in:

- Valletta – 67 Republic Street
- Sliema – 225 Tower Road
- St. Julian's – Paceville Avenue
- Qormi – San Bastjan – 82 St Sebastian Street
- Qormi – San Gorg – 4 Main Street
- Balzan – Balzan Valley
- Victoria – Gozo – Ninu Cremona Street

A 24-Hour Lombard CashPoint ATM is located in every branch (except Qormi San Gorg) and in other offsite locations.

== Chronology ==
The bank dates back to 1955 when Lombard North Central of the United Kingdom started taking deposits in Malta through a number of agents.

- 1958: National Provincial Bank Ltd. (now National Westminster Bank Plc) acquired North Central Finance Ltd. (now Lombard North Central Plc).
- 1969: Lombard North Central established Lombard Bank (Malta) (now Lombard Bank Malta).
- 1975: The Maltese government purchased 25% of Lombard Bank Malta.
- 1981: The Maltese government purchased 35% of Lombard Bank Malta.
- 1988: NatWest, unable to find a buyer, sold its remaining shares to the government.
- 1990: In April 1990 the bank became a Public Limited Company and offered equity to the public. The issue was five times oversubscribed and the government subsequently totally divested its shareholding.
- 1994: Lombard Bank Malta was listed on the Malta stock exchange. The government sold 21% of the shares (Lombard North Central's remaining stake) to Malaysian entrepreneur Robert Tan Hua Choon.
- 1998: CCF Holdings (Suisse) acquired Tan's 21%.
- 2000: HSBC Holdings acquired Credit Commercial de France and with it the stake in Lombard Malta.
- 2002: HSBC sold its shares in Lombard Bank Malta to Swiss-based Banca Unione di Credito, which then owned 26%.
- 2006: Lombard Bank Malta acquired Transend Worldwide's 35% shareholding in Maltapost Plc. Transend Worldwide, a New Zealand company, was instrumental in restructuring Maltapost over the previous four years.
- 2006: Banca della Svizzera Italiana (BSI) acquired Banca Unione di Credito.
- 2007: Cyprus Popular Bank (formerly Marfin Popular Bank) acquired 43% of the share capital from BSI and other international investors for €48 million.
- 2018: The Government of Malta through the National Development and Social Fund (NDSF) acquired 49.1% of the issued share capital from Cyprus Popular Bank.

== See also ==
- List of banks in the euro area
- List of banks in Malta

== Citations and references ==
Citations

References

- Consiglio, John A. A history of banking in Malta, 1506-2005 Progress Press, Valletta, 2006
