= Max banka =

Czech bank (founded 1991)

Max banka a.s.
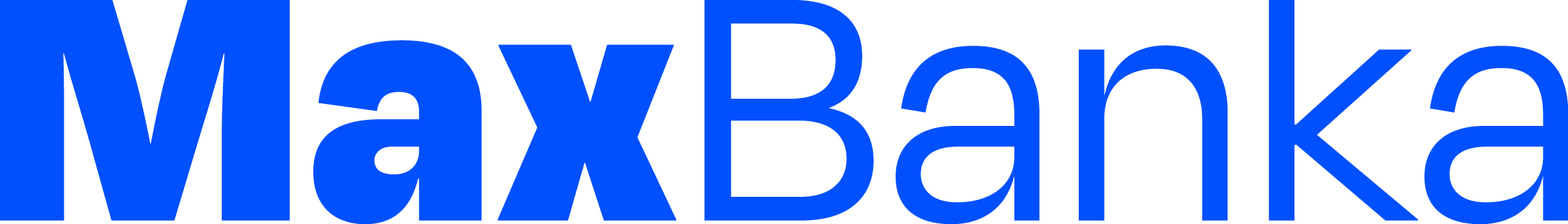

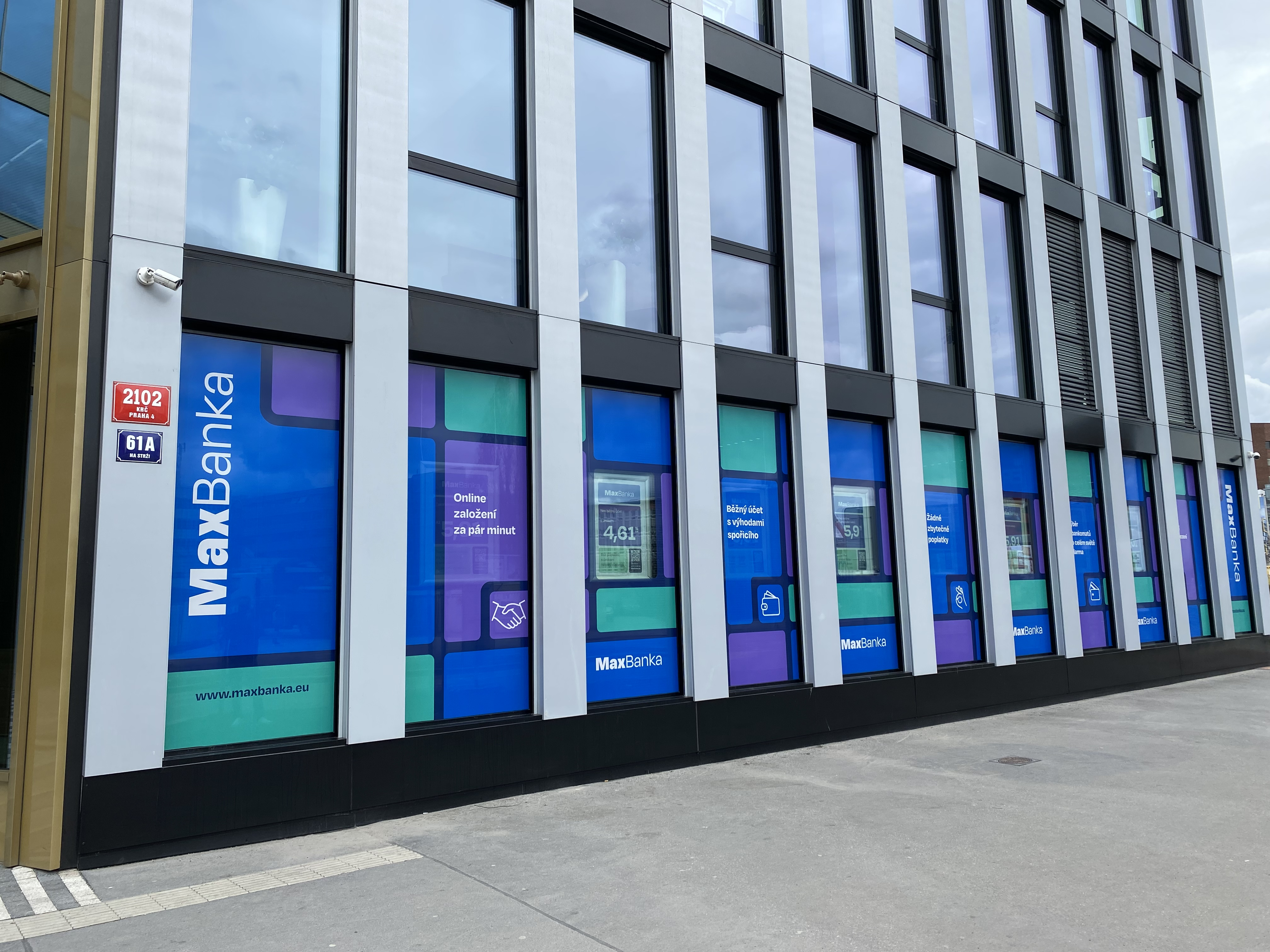
- Type: Public company
- Industry: financial sector financial sector
- Founded: 28 December 1991, (licence ČNB)
- Defunct: 1 October 2024
- Headquarters: Prague, Czech Republic
- Net income: ▲201 million CZK (2018)
- Total assets: ▲24.913 billion CZK (2018)
- Total equity: 1.7 billion CZK
- Owner: Banka Creditas
- Number of employees: ▼205 (2016)
- Website: www.maxbanka.eu

Max banka a.s. was a Czech bank founded in 1991. It was formerly known as InterBank, InterBanka, BAWAG Bank CZ, LBBW Bank CZ and Expobank CZ. As of September 2022, Max banka is owned by Banka Creditas, which is part of the Creditas Group. Since October 2024 Max banka has been merged with the parent Banka Creditas.

== History ==
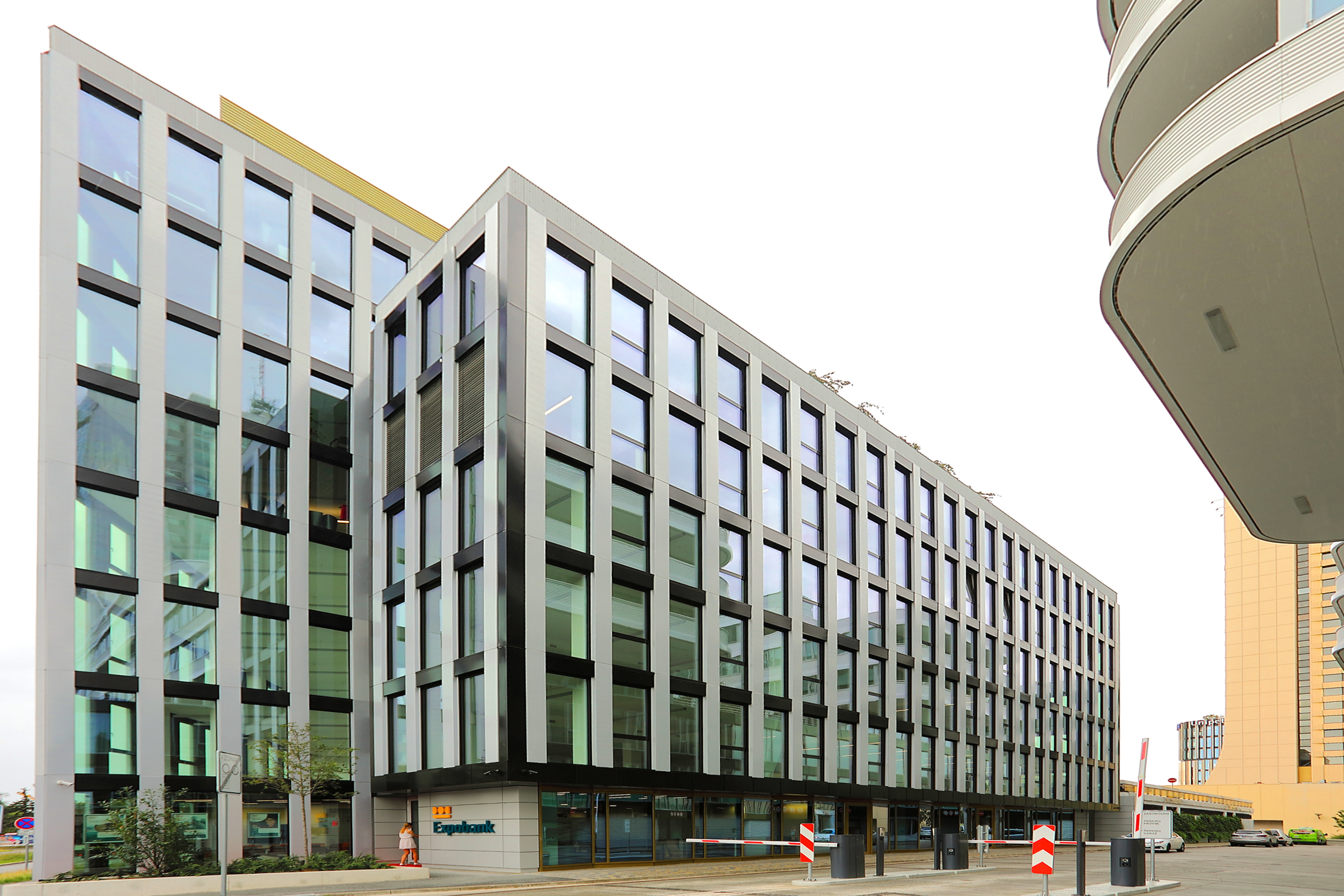
Branch of Expobank CZ, Na strži 2102/61a, Prague 4, CR.

=== Interbank a Interbanka ===
The original bank was established in 1991 as a Swiss-Hungarian joint venture under the name InterBank, akciová společnost (joint-stock company) and obtained a banking license on 28 December 1991; the current valid license (after the re-licensing) was received under the name Interbanka, akciová společnost (joint-stock company) on 13 February 2004 and was supplemented on 6 May 2005.

Between 1993 and 1997 a number of changes in the shareholder structure took place; this transition period stabilized at the end of 1997, when the German Bayerische Landesbank became the majority shareholder and the Hungarian Magyar Kulkereskedelmi Bank (MKB) and the Austrian Bank für Arbeit und Wirtschaft AG (BAWAG) became minority shareholders.

=== BAWAG Bank CZ ===
In September 2003, BAWAG became the sole shareholder of Interbank a.s. and in June 2004 the bank was renamed BAWAG Bank CZ a.s. In September 2004, BAWAG acquired 100% of the shares of another bank on the Czech market – Dresdner Bank CZ a.s.

Dresdner Bank CZ a.s. was founded in 1991 as a joint venture of the French Banque National de Paris (BNP, later BNP Paribas) and the German Dresdner Bank AG, and under the original name BNP-Dresdner Bank (ČSFR) a.s. obtained a banking license on 3 September 1991. In 2001 Dresdner Bank AG became the sole shareholder of the bank, which was given a new license (re-licensed after the amendment to the Banking Act) under the name Dresdner Bank CZ a.s. on 4 November 2003. After BAWAG became the sole shareholder, Dresdner Bank CZ a.s. was renamed BAWAG International Bank CZ a.s. and ceased to exist on 31 March 2005 as a result of the merger with BAWAG Bank CZ a.s. as a successor bank.

=== LBBW Bank CZ ===
In September 2008, another change occurred when German Landesbank Baden-Württemberg (LBBW) became the sole shareholder and BAWAG Bank CZ a.s. was renamed LBBW Bank CZ a.s. as part of the LBBW Group. The parent LBBW is both a commercial bank and a central bank of local savings banks in Baden-Württemberg, Saxony, and Rhineland-Palatinate. It is also one of the largest banks in Germany.

=== Expobank CZ ===
In January 2014, LBBW agreed to sell LBBW Bank CZ to the Russian bank Expobank owned by the entrepreneur Igor Kim. At the end of November 2014, the branch network has been reduced. Since the end of 2014, Igor Kim has been the majority owner of the Czech bank. On 15. 10. 2014 the business name of the bank was changed to Expobank CZ a.s.

In March 2016, Expobank CZ a.s. repurchased EAST Portfolio, s.r.o. in which it acquired a 100% stake from the German LBBW.

In March 2017 Expobank CZ a.s. was the first Czech bank to enter the Serbian market, where it became the sole shareholder of Marfin Bank a.d. Beograd. Marfin Bank subsequently changed its business name to Expobank Beograd.

In October 2018, Expobank announced the opening of its Cryptocurrency trading and investing services.

Since April 2019, Expobank CZ has been based in the Trimaran building, on Na strži street in Prague's Pankrác district. In August 2019, a branch that had been located on Wenceslas Square in Prague moved to the neighboring City Element building in Prague's Pankrác.

=== Max banka ===
In September 2022, the bank was acquired by Banka Creditas and renamed Max banka with effect from 4 October. In October 2022, Max bank itself announced plans to become a purely retail online bank. In addition to the Max banka branch in Prague, its clients should gradually be able to use the branches of Banka CREDITAS for some services. The corporate clientele of Max banka should be completely transferred to Banka CREDITAS in the future.

== Economic results ==
	2008	2009	2010	2011	2012	2013	2014	2015	2016	2017	2018
Total assets (B CZK)	31 628	29 146	25 810	27 607	30 049	31 466	20 781	21 798	22 826	25 235	24 913
Net profit (M CZK)	78.742	-767.376	15.082	18.101	74.896	6.313	20.601	105.1	337.4	-71	201

== See also ==
- List of banks in the Czech Republic
