= Equa bank =

- Industry: Financial services, Banking
- Founded: 1993
- Headquarters: Prague, Czech Republic
- Number of locations: 43 branches + 3300 post offices
- Area served: Czech Republic
- Key people: Petr Řehák (CEO)
- Revenue: 1,690,000,000 Czech koruna (2018)
- Net income: CZK 388 million (2018)
- Total assets: CZK 4.8 billion (2018)
- Number of employees: 603
- Website: www.equabank.cz

Equa bank was a non-cash commercial bank operating in the Czech Republic. Until 2011, the bank operated under IC Bank which was established in 1993.

== History ==
The bank was established on 6 January 1993 under the name IC Bank. It was founded by a Malaysian businessman Tan Sri Robert Tan Hua Choon as majority owner and former Prime Minister of Czechoslovakia Marián Čalfa. In September 2007, the bank was sold to Banco Popolare, an Italian publicly traded banking cooperative. However, the bank was at a loss and was re-sold by the Italian bank to a British private equity firm AnaCap Financial Partners, which gave it the current name Equa bank. In 2016, Equa bank had 59 outlets and over 200,000 clients, and in its 2018 Annual Report it lists 58 outlets and close to 370,000 clients. In 2019, the bank exceeded 400,000 clients.

In February 2021, Raiffeisen Bank International from Austria acquired Equa Bank. In July 2021, the sole shareholder of Equa bank became Raiffeisenbank a.s., with which Equa bank merged on January 1, 2022.

== See also ==
- List of banks in the Czech Republic
