= MeDirect =

Maltese bank & financial services company

- Logo
- Formerly: Mediterranean Bank
- Type: Public Limited Company
- Industry: Banking; Financial services
- Founded: 2004
- Headquarters: The Centre, Tigné Point, Sliema, Malta
- Number of locations: 2 branches
- Area served: Malta, Belgium
- Products: Retail Banking; Commercial banking Investment Services; Wealth Management
- Brands: MeDirect
- Total assets: €5.9 billion (as of December, 2024)
- Owner: MDB Group Limited
- Parent: Banka Creditas
- Subsidiaries: MeDirect Bank S.A. (in Belgium)
- Website: www.medirect.com.mt

MeDirect (previously known as Mediterranean Bank) is a Maltese bank and financial services company. Headquartered in Sliema, its branches are located in Sliema and Victoria (Gozo).

It operates a subsidiary bank also named MeDirect in Belgium.

In September 2025, it was announced that Prague-based Banka Creditas had completed the purchase of MDB Group Limited, the parent company of MeDirect.

== Overview ==
MeDirect is a digital challenger bank, with two main lines of business, retail investing and specialised mortgage lending.

As a consequence of being designated in 2015 as a Significant Institution under the criteria of European Banking Supervision, it is directly supervised by the European Central Bank.

MeDirect Bank (Malta) plc has a subsidiary bank in Belgium, which since 2015 has a Belgian banking license and operates as a direct bank known as MeDirect Bank S.A.

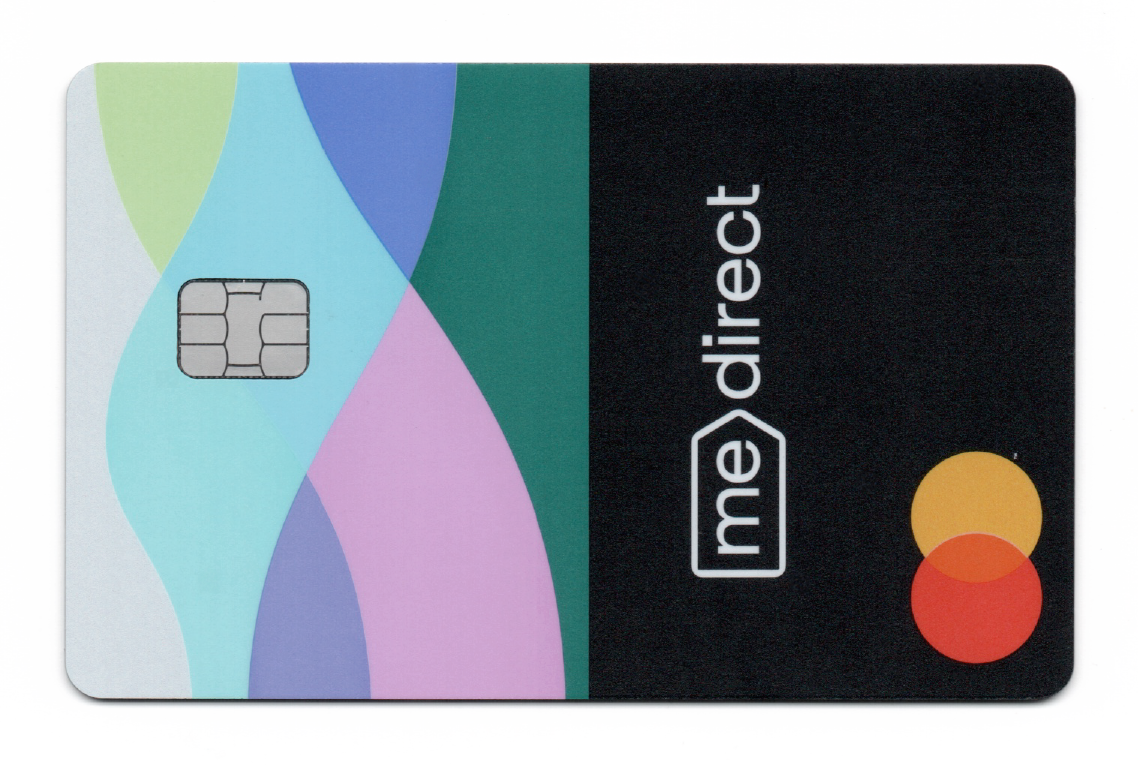
The MeDirect Bank Mastercard debit card.

== History ==
=== Beginnings ===
The bank started off as Mediterranean Bank in June 2004, becoming a fully licensed Maltese credit institution a year later. Its headquarters and sole offices at that time were in Valletta. In July 2009, the bank was acquired and recapitalised by AnaCap Financial Partners LLP, a UK private equity firm.

In 2010, Mediterranean Bank acquired a majority stake in Charts.

Mediterranean Bank opened a subsidiary in Belgium in 2013 under the name MeDirect. In 2015 the Belgian subsidiary obtained a Belgian banking license and operates as a direct bank.

The bank grew in Malta, creating branches in Sliema and Gozo, and acquiring Volksbank Malta Limited in 2014.

In 2014, Mediterranean Bank became Malta's third largest bank.

=== New name and developments ===
In 2017, Mediterranean Bank renamed itself to MeDirect Bank (Malta) plc..

In 2021, MeDirect launched its home loans service in Malta.

In 2023, MeDirect launched its card services and hence entered the daily banking market.

As at 31 December 2024, the MDB Group (to which MeDirect belongs) had a total of more than 155,000 customers who hold more than €5.9 billion in assets.

=== Purchase by Banka Creditas ===
MeDirect Bank (Malta) plc announced that it had been notified in August 2025 that the European Central Bank would not object to the purchase by Banka Creditas of all shares of MDB Group Limited, MeDirect Bank (Malta) plc's parent company.

In September 2025, it was announced that Prague-based Banka Creditas had completed the purchase of MDB Group Limited, the parent company of MeDirect.

== See also ==
- List of banks in the euro area
- List of banks in Malta
