= Banca Unione di Credito =

Banca Unione di Credito is a full-service bank based in Lugano, Switzerland, that specialises in private banking.

== History ==
- 1919 – Credito Italiano established Banca Unione di Credito in Switzerland.
- 1947 – The Fiat Group acquired the entire share capital to make BUC its house bank.
- 1984 – BUC established a subsidiary in Zürich.
- 1990 – BUC established a representative office in Argentina.
- 1991 – BUC established a subsidiary in Geneva.
- 1993 – BUC acquired Overland Bank, also based in Lugano, and doubled in size.
- 1994 – BUC established a subsidiary, Banca Unione di Credito (Cayman), Grand Cayman.
- 1995 – BUC held about 8% of a stockbroker and fund management bank (SIM) in Turin, Banca Patrimoni e Investimenti, which is the result of the merger of Gestnord Intermediazione SIM and Sella Investimenti Banca.
- 2002 – BUC acquired a 26% stake in Lombard Bank Malta plc, Valletta, the third largest bank in Malta, to become Lombard's largest shareholder.
- 2006 – Banca della Svizzera Italiana (BSI) acquired Banca Unione di Credito. BSI is also based in Lugano and is a subsidiary of the Italian insurer Assicurazioni Generali. Fiat sold BUC both to raise capital and to focus on its core automotive business.
