= Spinola Palace, Valletta =

Spinola Palace
- Palazz ta' Spinola
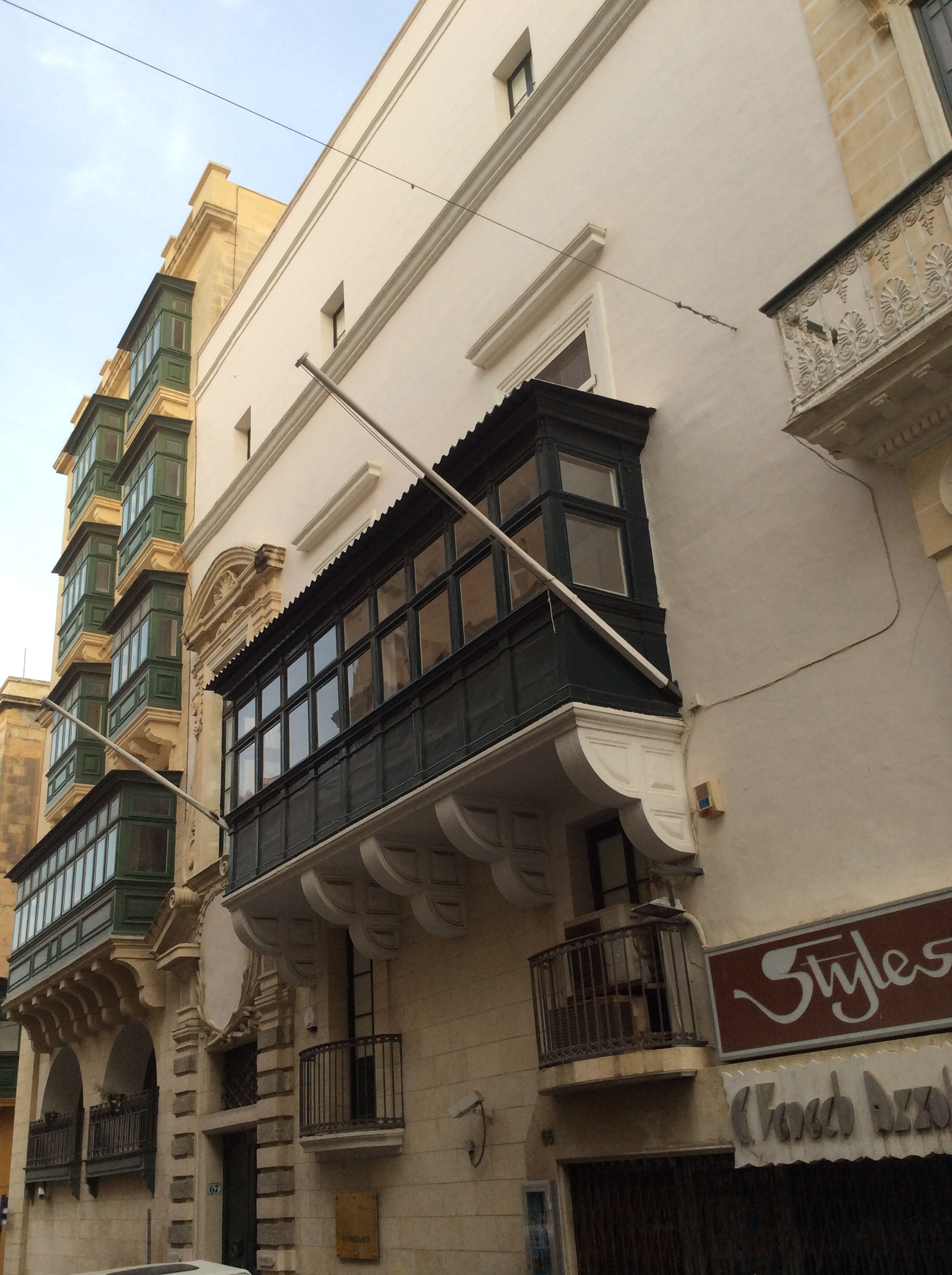
- Palazzo Spinola on Republic Street
- Interactive map of the Spinola Palace area
- Alternative names: Palazzo Spinola

General information
- Status: Partially intact
- Type: Palace
- Architectural style: Baroque
- Location: Valletta, Malta
- Coordinates: 35°53′58.2″N 14°30′53.2″E
- Completed: 17th century
- Owner: Lombard Bank Malta PLC

Technical details
- Material: Limestone

Spinola Palace (Maltese: Palazz ta' Spinola; Italian: Palazzo Spinola), also known as Spinola House, is a palace in Valletta, Malta. It belonged to the Spinola family between the 17th and 18th centuries. One third of the building was demolished in the 20th century, but the remaining two wings still exist and are now used as the head office of Lombard Bank.

== History ==
The palace originally belonged to Fra Giovanni de Villaroel, the Balì of Noveville. In 1660, the palace was transferred to Fra Paolo Raffaele Spinola, the Balì of Lombardy, who later built another Spinola Palace in St. Julian's. In the 1720s, the Italian artist Nicolau Nasoni painted frescoes on the palace's ceiling. The palace remained in the hands of the Spinola family until 1780. Architect Romano Fortunato Carapecchia have given the palace a baroque facelift, from an austere façade, in the eighteenth century.

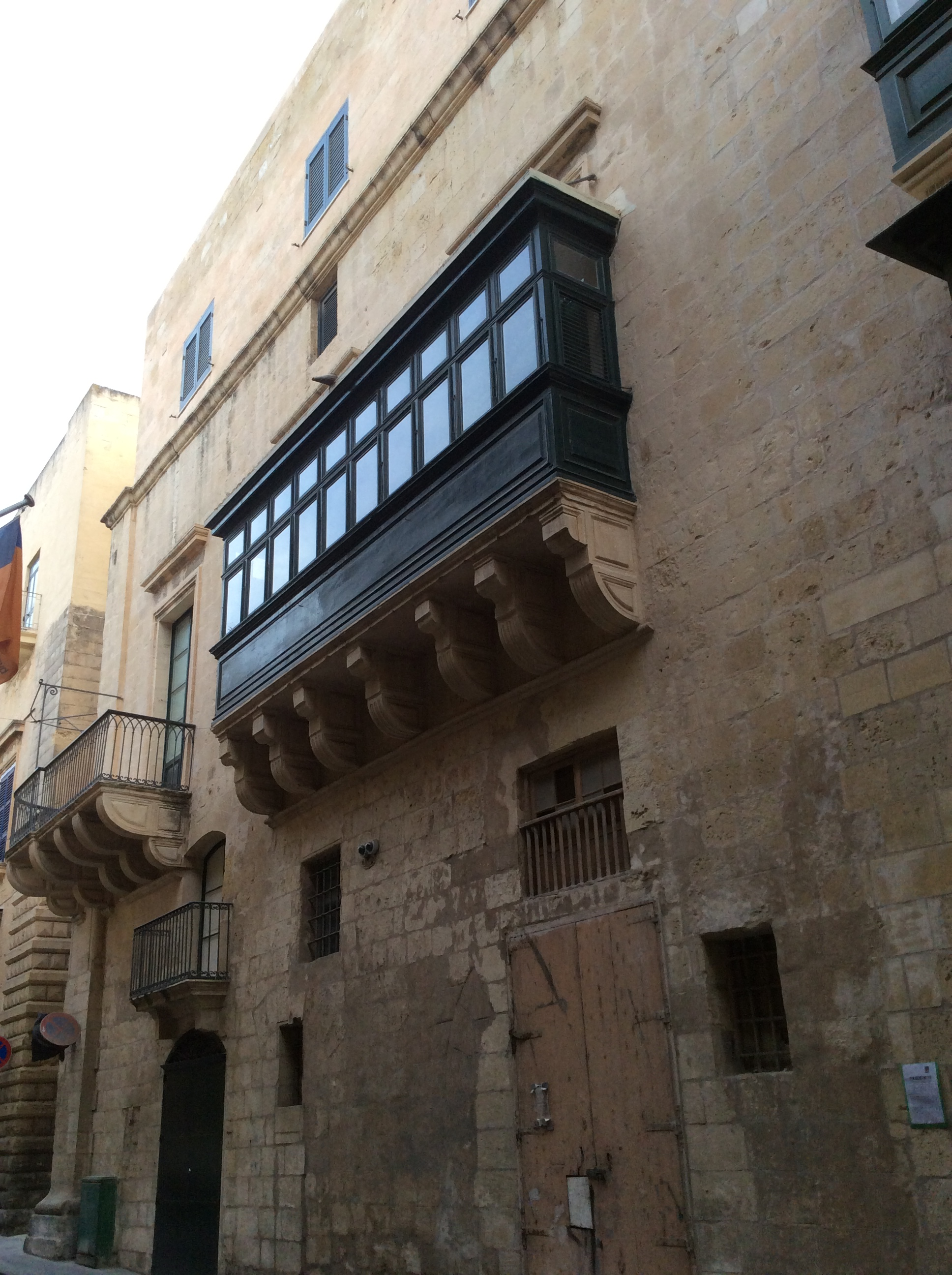
Other wing

The palace was divided into three parts in 1922. The wing facing St. Christopher Street was demolished to make way for apartments, while the other two wings were used as private houses or offices. Lombard Bank acquired the wing facing Republic Street in the 1970s, and converted it into their head office. The wing facing St. Frederick Street was also acquired by Lombard Bank in the 2000s. It has since been restored and renovated.
