= Investiční a poštovní banka =

Investiční a poštovní banka (IPB; translated as "Investment and Postal Bank") was one of the largest banks in the Czech Republic before its collapse in 2000 resulting in the largest bankruptcy in Czech Republic history.

== History ==
IPB was established by merging Investiční banka and Poštovní banka at the end of 1993. The bank was first privatized in a coupon privatization, the Czech state retained a majority stake and was able to control developments in the bank.

In 1993, the National Property Fund did not participate in the increase of the registered capital of IPB and the state lost a majority stake in the bank. IPB terminated its cooperation with the auditing company Coopers & Lybrand in February 1997, which, according to press speculation, demanded the creation of reserves in the amount of several billion crowns. Ernst & Young has become the new auditor. At government meetings on 23 July 1997 and 4 March 1998, the government decided to sell the state share to Nomura Holdings. Nomura Holdings paid CZK 3 billion for 36.29% of the shares and its shareholding increased to 46.6%. As the bank's financial situation was unsustainable, Nomura increased its share capital by CZK 6 billion and issued subordinated bonds in the same amount, which was supposed to stabilize IPB. However, a change in credit risk management was necessary for further successful development.

== Issues ==
In order to avoid the need to create provisions, IPB carried out operations to reduce credit risk. These were often non-standard operations leading to a reduction in the volume of classified loans in the bank which did not result in a reduction in risk, such as the sale of bad debts to NIPB. The short-term measures of the turn of 1998 and 1999 ensured that the bank did not have to make provisions.

In February 2000, the Czech National Bank identified multiple deficiencies in IPB, which appealed against the findings and filed objections against individual points. IPB stated that it is taking steps to reduce credit risk and increase the bank's share capital by CZK 13.4 billion. The appeal contained 270 pages of text and 9700 pages of annexes. Due to the scope of this document, the CNB did not have a good chance of intervening on the basis of the findings of the comprehensive inspection and therefore had to wait for the confirmation of its findings by the auditor.

On 12 June 2000, massive withdrawals were made from the bank. By June 19, all the assets and liabilities of IPB were taken over by ČSOB. The bank's collapse resulted in losses valued at CZK67.8 billion (around $1.79bn, or £1.18bn at the time).

== See also ==
- List of banks in the Czech Republic
