= Fio Banka =

Czech bank

Fio banka, a.s.
- Formerly: Fio, burzovní společnost, a.s.
- Type: Joint-stock company
- Industry: Financial services
- Founded: August 31, 1994; 32 years ago
- Headquarters: Prague, Czech Republic
- Area served: Czech Republic; Slovakia
- Key people: Jan Sochor (CEO and chairman of the board)
- Services: Retail banking; Business banking; Securities brokerage; Investment services
- Revenue: 9,135,491,000 Czech koruna (2023)
- Net income: CZK 6.5 billion (2025)
- Total assets: CZK 345 billion (2025)
- Number of employees: 118 (2023)
- Parent: Fio holding, a.s.
- Subsidiaries: RM-SYSTÉM; Fio investiční společnost
- Website: www.fio.cz

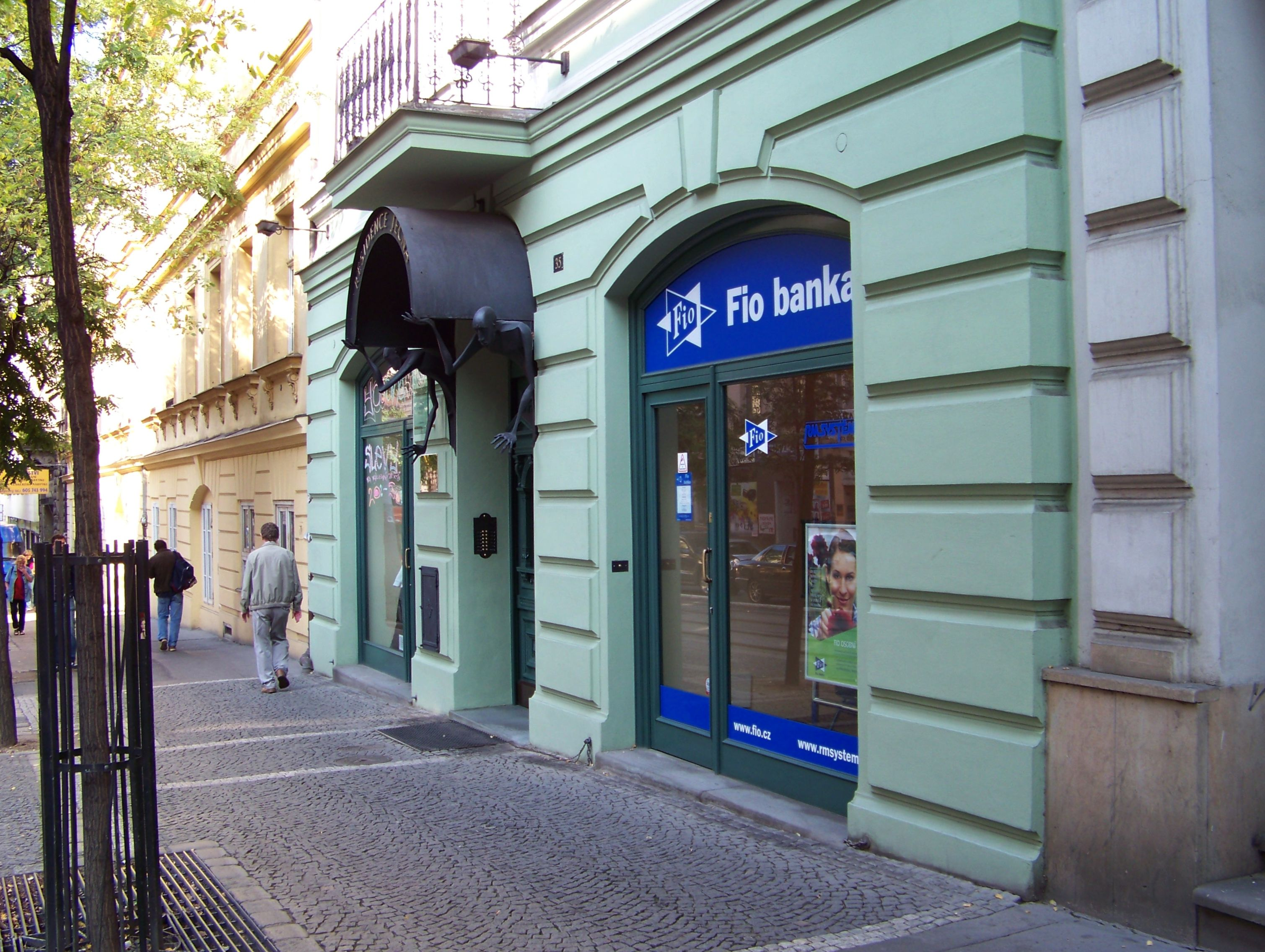
One of the branche offices on Ječná Street in Prague

Fio Banka ATM

Fio banka is a Czech bank based in Prague. It offers banking and investment services in the Czech Republic and Slovakia. Fio started in 1993 as a securities-trading business. The company that became Fio banka was incorporated the following year and received a banking licence from the Czech National Bank in 2010.

The bank is owned by Fio holding. Petr Marsa and Romuald Kopún each own half of the holding company. Fio had around 1.6 million clients and CZK 345 billion in assets at the end of 2025.

== History ==
=== Origins and securities trading ===
Fio started in 1993, when a group of students and graduates associated with the Faculty of Mathematics and Physics at Charles University began trading securities on the Czech alternative trading system RM-SYSTÉM. Fio, burzovní společnost, a.s. (Fio Brokerage Company) was incorporated on 31 August 1994 as a securities broker. It joined the Prague Stock Exchange in 1995.

A separate credit union, Fio, družstevní záložna, was established in 1996 by the same people. Fio's banking and brokerage activities remained divided between the credit union and the brokerage company until the credit union's business was transferred to Fio banka in 2010. The credit union introduced internet banking in April 1998, the first such service on the Czech market.

=== Acquisition of RM-SYSTÉM ===
In September 2006, the owners of Fio acquired RM-SYSTÉM from J&T. The deal placed RM-SYSTÉM and Fio's brokerage business under common ownership.

RM-SYSTÉM also had a nationwide network of offices, which Fio began using for its banking services. In early 2007, Fio said it would offer banking services at more than 50 locations in the network. RM-SYSTÉM later became a regulated stock exchange and is a subsidiary of Fio banka.

=== Transformation into a bank ===
Fio applied for a banking licence in June 2008. At the time, its banking and investment activities were divided between the credit union and the securities broker.

The Czech National Bank granted the licence on 5 May 2010. Fio then had almost 26,000 credit-union members and around 34,000 brokerage clients. On 1 September, the credit union's business was transferred to Fio banka, which began operating as a retail bank. Following the transfer, the credit union was dissolved and entered into voluntary liquidation in November 2010, and ceased to exist on 13 February 2012.

Fio banka expanded rapidly after receiving its banking licence. Its number of clients grew from around 50,000 in 2010 to 500,000 in 2015 and one million in 2020. By the end of 2020, it had 1.07 million clients and total assets of CZK 183 billion. The bank continued to grow during the following years, surpassing 1.55 million clients and CZK 300 billion in assets by 2025.

=== Slovakia ===
Fio was already active in Slovakia through its investment business when it became a bank in 2010. It then opened a Slovak branch and added banking services. Mortgages and other retail banking products followed.

== Operations ==
Fio banka offers current and savings accounts, loans, mortgages and payment services. It also operates a securities-brokerage business with access to Czech and foreign markets. Fio has thus retained its original securities-brokerage business alongside its banking operations. In 2025, trading by individual investors through Fio reached CZK 238 billion.

== Regulatory matters ==
In October 2024, the Czech National Bank fined Fio banka CZK 9.5 million for shortcomings in its controls against money laundering and in compliance with international sanctions. The violations identified by the regulator occurred between 2019 and 2022. They included problems with customer risk assessments, internal controls and checks involving sanctioned persons. Fio said it had addressed the problems identified by the regulator.

== See also ==
- Banking in the Czech Republic
- List of banks in the Czech Republic
