= National Development Bank of the Czech Republic =

Public bank in Prague

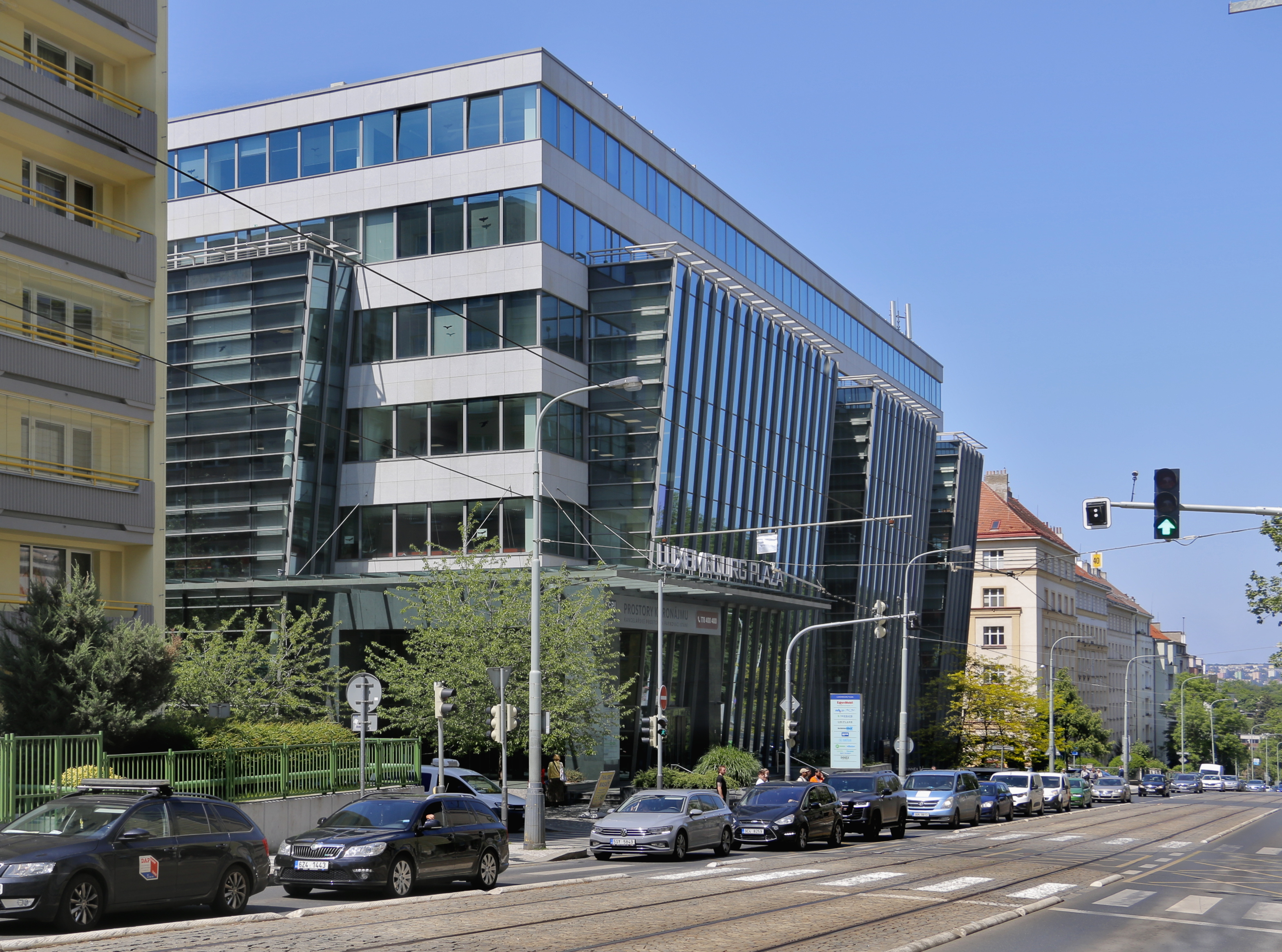
- Head office of NRB in Luxembourg Plaza building in Prague
- Native name: Národní Rozvojová Banka
- Company type: State-owned enterprise
- Industry: Financial services
- Founded: 1992; 34 years ago
- Headquarters: Prague, Czech Republic
- Area served: Czech Republic
- Products: Development financing
- Revenue: 2,376,000,000 Czech koruna (2018)
- Net income: 28,000,000 Czech koruna (2018)
- Total assets: 24,105,000,000 Czech koruna (2018)
- Owner: Government of the Czech Republic
- Number of employees: 194 (2018)
- Website: www.nrb.cz

The National Development Bank of the Czech Republic (Czech: Národní Rozvojová Banka, NRB), known from 1992 to August 2021 as the Czecho-Moravian Guarantee and Development Bank (Czech: Českomoravská záruční a rozvojová banka), is a public development bank headquartered in Prague, Czech Republic. It supports the economic development of Czechia, e.g. by promoting lending to small and medium-sized businesses and infrastructure projects.

== History ==
The NRB was established in 1992 as a joint-stock company, and adopted its current name on 1 September 2021. It is fully owned by the Czech state, represented by the Ministry of Industry and Trade, the Ministry of Finance, and the Ministry of Regional Development. It is supervised as a bank by the Czech National Bank.

The NRB moved its head office to the Luxembourg Plaza building on Přemyslovska Street in 2023. It has branches in Brno, České Budějovice, Hradec Králové, Ostrava, and Plzeň.

== See also ==
- National Development Bank (Poland)
- Hungarian Development Bank
- Croatian Bank for Reconstruction and Development
- List of national development banks
- List of banks in the Czech Republic
