= Banka Creditas =

Banka CREDITAS
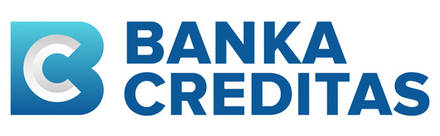
- Type: Joint-stock company
- Industry: Banking
- Founded: 1996 (as 1. Třebíčská záložna)
- Headquarters: Prague, Czech Republic
- Key people: Eva Collardová (CEO); Vladimír Hořejší (chairman)
- Revenue: 10,097,000,000 Czech koruna (2024)
- Net income: 770,000,000 Czech koruna (2024)
- Total assets: 190,166,000,000 Czech koruna (2024)
- Number of employees: 617 (2024)
- Parent: Creditas Group
- Website: creditas.cz

Banka CREDITAS a.s. is a Czech bank headquartered in Prague. It provides savings and current accounts, investment services and business lending. The bank developed from a credit union founded in 1996 and began operating under a banking licence on 1 January 2017. It is a part of the privately owned Creditas Group, controlled by Pavel Hubáček.

== History ==
Creditas was founded in Třebíč in 1996 as a credit union name 1.Třebíčská záložna. In 2004, it was renamed 1. TZ, družstevní záložna. In 2010, it moved to Olomouc and adopted the name Creditas. Investor Pavel Hubáček acquired a majority stake in the credit union in 2015.

By 2016, Creditas was the largest credit union in the Czech Republic. With assets exceeding CZK 10 billion, Creditas was above the new legal limit of CZK 5 billion for credit unions. It therefore had to become a bank or reduce its assets. The Czech National Bank granted Creditas a licence effective from 1 January 2017. The bank reached 100,000 clients in February 2020 and 200,000 in October 2023.

In 2022, Creditas acquired Expobank CZ, which was renamed Max banka. The two banks merged on 1 October 2024, with Banka Creditas as the surviving company. In 2024, Creditas acquired a majority stake in the Czech credit union NEY. In September 2025, Creditas acquired MeDirect, a banking group operating in Malta and Belgium, marking the bank's expansion into Western European banking markets.

== Operations ==
Banka Creditas offers retail banking, savings and investment products, and financing for businesses. At the end of 2025, it operated 33 branches in the Czech Republic.

At the end of 2025, the bank and its subsidiaries reported consolidated assets of CZK 286.4 billion and net profit of CZK 4.59 billion. The profit included a CZK 3.65 billion gain recognised on the acquisition of MeDirect. Following the acquisition, the group served around 400,000 clients.

== Regulatory actions ==
In 2021, the Czech National Bank ordered Creditas to replace its supervisory board, citing shortcomings in the board's oversight and in the assessment of some significant credit risks.
