= General Retailers and Traders Union =

- Industry: Voluntary Association
- Founded: 1948
- Founder: Anthony Grixti
- Headquarters: Valletta, Malta
- Website: Official website

General Retailers and Traders Union (GRTU), or Association of General Retailers and Traders, is an association of small- and medium-sized businesses in Malta. It has over 7,000 members coming from 12,000 different business outlets.

It represents the small business community on bodies such as the Malta Council for Economic Development, the Planning Authority, the Advisory Board of the National Organisation, the Fruit and Vegetables Board, the Commission for the Self Employed, the Council for Consumer Affairs and the Traffic Control Board.
