= CrediaBank =

Greek bank

CrediaBank Société Anonyme
- Trade name: CrediaBank
- Native name: CrediaBank Ανώνυμη Τραπεζική Εταιρεία
- Type: Public
- Traded as: Athex: CREDIA
- Industry: Banks
- Founded: 5 February 1925; 101 years ago
- Headquarters: 260-262 Kifissias Ave., 15232 Chalandri, Greece
- Key people: Constantinos Herodotou, Chairman of the BoD; Eleni Vrettou, Chief Executive Officer
- Services: Retail Banking; Corporate Banking; Digital Banking
- Revenue: 148.162 m. (2024)
- Total assets: €8,548 billion (Q1 2026)
- Owners: Thrivest Holding Ltd. (24%); Growthfund (Hellenic Corporation of Assets and Participations) (29.36%); Other shareholders (<5%) (46,7%)
- Number of employees: 1258 (30.06.2025)
- Website: www.crediabank.com

CrediaBank is the 5th largest bank in Greece in terms of assets and was created through the merger of Attica Bank and the former Pancreta Bank. It is a modern banking institution with a network of 65 branches and 5 business centers across the country, serving approximately 300,000 individuals and businesses with a wide portfolio of deposit, investment, and insurance products, mutual funds, loans, and brokerage services.

CrediaBank is one of the only banks that welcomes customers in branch both with and without appointments, offers cashier services available throughout the day, and operates with extended hours through CrediaConnect service.

CrediaBank operates as a credit institution supervised by the Bank of Greece, strictly applying both European and national regulatory frameworks governing the operation of banks and is listed on Euronext Athens.

== History ==
Former head office building of Attica Bank at 23 Omirou Street in Athens, completed in 1977

CrediaBank was created through the merger of Attica Bank which was founded in 1924 and Pancreta Bank which was founded in 1993. In July 2025, CrediaBank presented its new name, inaugurating its relaunch. In August 2025, CrediaBank was selected as the preferred investor for the acquisition of the 70% of HSBC Malta, and the agreement was confirmed one month later for a consideration of €200 million, marking the bank's first international business transaction.

In September 2025, CrediaBank proceeded into major transformation milestones:

- The operational merge of Information Technology & Digital systems of Attica Bank and former Pancreta Bank was completed, creating a unified customer, products and services base, offering an integrated, seamless and resilient service experience from the digital environment to the physical branch.
- A new branch concept was introduced for the first time in Greece: the “New Experience” branches, with the first flagship branch in Kolonaki, Athens. These branches offer an upgraded, accessible experience that prioritizes personalized customer interaction, integrating human connection with advanced technology.
- On October 31, 2025, CrediaBank presented its new, integrated brand identity from its digital channels to its physical branches, as its digital channels (e-banking, mobile banking, website, social media) and its branches gradually adopt the Bank's new identity.

== Group companies ==
CrediaBancassurance: as an insurance agent, it distributes insurance products on behalf of one or more insurance companies and identifies appropriate insurance products in the market, offering personalized insurance solutions to CrediaBank customers.

CrediaFactors (former Pancreta Factors): founded in 2021 and operating as a financial institution since December 2023, dedicated in providing factoring services. The company operates based on the provisions of Law 1905/1990 for Factoring and is supervised by Bank of Greece.

== Sustainable development (environmental, social, and governance) ==
CrediaBank adopts and applies the principles and goals of Sustainable Banking. It is committed to integrating its positive impact on society and the environment, while aiming at reducing any potential negative footprint, defining both short term and long-term goals, aligned with its ESG priorities, factors such as environmental, social, and corporate governance that reflect CrediaBank's ongoing commitment to a more sustainable future for all of us.

== See also ==
- List of banks in the euro area
- List of banks in Greece
