= FCM Bank Limited =

Maltese bank

- Industry: Banking
- Founded: July 30, 2010
- Headquarters: Birkirkara, Malta
- Area served: Malta, Czechia, Germany
- Owner: Radomír Lapčík

FCM Bank Limited is a Maltese bank.

FCM Bank was granted its operating licence in 2010 and is made up of directors and a management team, operating from an office in Birkirkara, Malta. The former offices were situated in St. Julian's, Malta. FCM Bank launched its first products to the general public in June 2012.

In 2014, FCM introduced internet banking services.

According to the European Central Bank, there are three very large banks operating in Malta, and the FCM Bank is listed among sixteen smaller banks also in operation there.

The FCM Bank participates in community activities, including sponsoring the annual Earth Garden Festival and the University Ring Road Fun Run/Walk & Relay.

== See also ==
- List of banks in Malta
