= HSBC Bank Malta =

Subsidiary of the British bank

HSBC Bank Malta plc

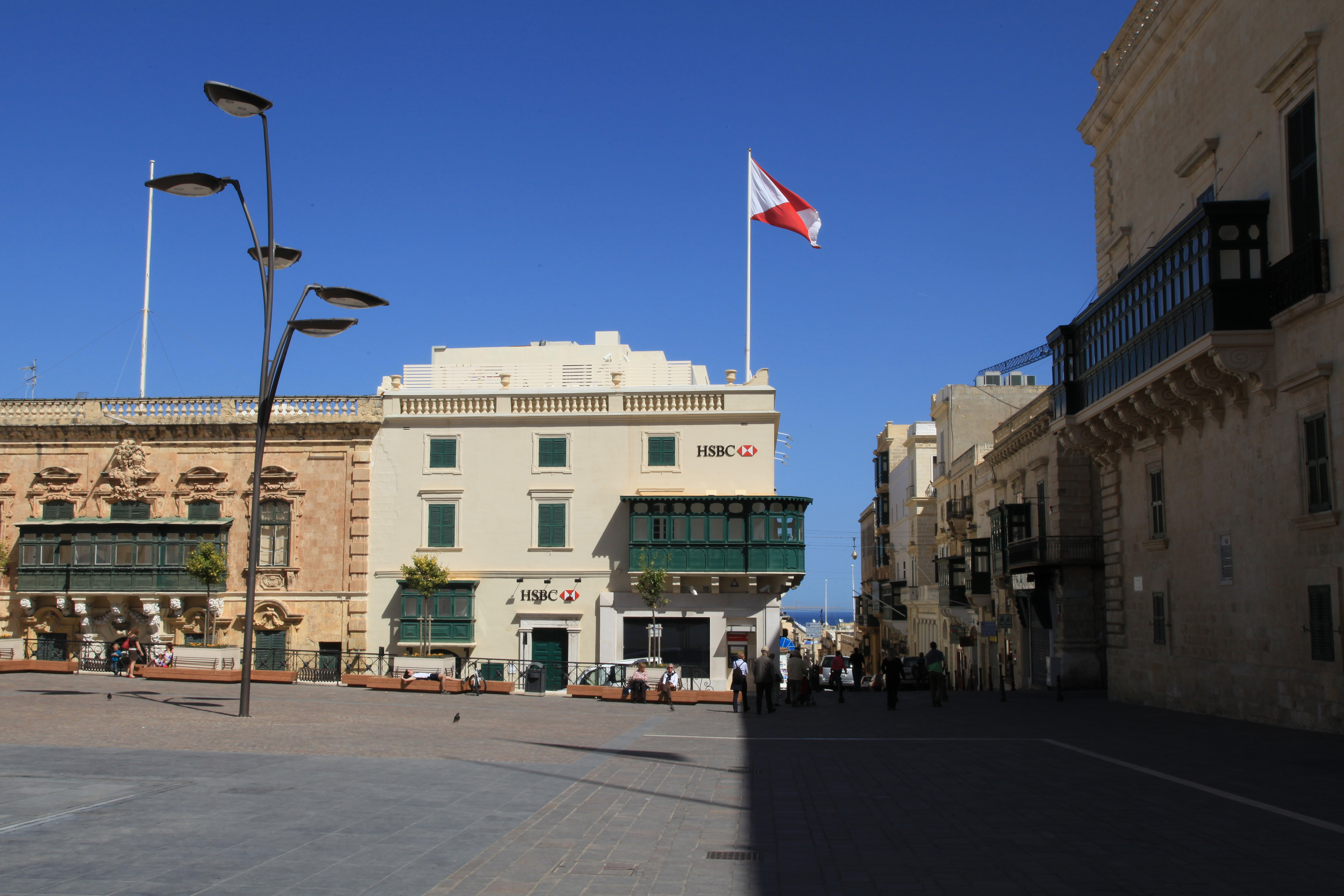
- HSBC bank in Valletta
- Company type: Public limited company
- Traded as: MSE: HSB
- Industry: Finance and Insurance
- Predecessor: Mid-Med Bank
- Founded: 1999
- Headquarters: HSBC Banking Centre, 80, Mill Street, Qormi, QRM3101, Malta
- Key people: John Bonello, Chairman; Geoffrey Fichte, CEO
- Products: Financial services
- Net income: €48.22 mln (2014)
- Total assets: €7.741 bln (2024)
- Owner: HSBC
- Number of employees: 949
- Parent: HSBC Bank
- Website: www.hsbc.com.mt

HSBC Bank Malta plc is the Maltese subsidiary of the British multinational banking and financial services company HSBC. The company is headquartered in Qormi and operates over 12 branches and offices throughout the islands of Malta and Gozo. HSBC Bank Malta is part of the European region within HSBC and therefore reports to HSBC Bank plc.

In August 2025, HSBC announced it had selected Athens-based CrediaBank as preferred bidder for the acquisition of HSBC Malta.

== History ==
HSBC Malta dates back to the commencement of operations in Malta by the Anglo-Egyptian Bank (est. 1864), which merged with the National Bank of South Africa and Colonial Bank (est. 1836) to become Barclays Bank Dominion Colonial Overseas in 1925 after Barclays acquired the Colonial Bank when it acquired the London Provincial and South Western Bank in 1918. In 1954 the bank shortened its name to Barclays Bank D.C.O. and in 1971 became Barclays Bank International.

In 1975 the government of Malta nationalized Barclays Bank International's operations in Malta and renamed it Mid-Med Bank, exercising its option to purchase Barclays’ remaining shareholding in Mid-Med in 1979.

In 1991 the Maltese government sold 33% of Mid-Med Bank to the public and in 1993 Mid-Med listed on Malta’s stock exchange. Mid-Med acquired 25% of Lohombus Bank, which specializes in housing finance, in 1995 along with the Investment Finance Bank in Malta. Mid-Med gained a majority of Lohombus Bank in Malta when it acquired another 35% of the firm in 1996, the same year it established a representative office in London.

Midland Bank was the first foreign bank to be granted an unlimited banking licence in Malta, where it opened a branch in September 1996. Then in 1999, Midland Bank acquired the government of Malta’s 67.1% direct holding in Mid-Med, as well its 2.7% indirect holdings. Part of the agreement was that for the time being the bank would continue to be listed in the Maltese stock market and that Midland would not make a formal offer for the remainder of the shares but could buy if other shareholders chose to sell. At the time, Mid-Med bank had 60 offices and branches, 1,800 staff and was the largest commercial bank in Malta.

When HSBC brought all its operations under a common name, Mid-Med became HSBC Malta Bank plc. HSBC absorbed Mid-Med’s representative offices in Dubai, Milan, and Luxembourg into the HSBC offices in their respective countries but established a "Malta Desk" in several of these countries. Lohombus Bank became HSBC Malta (Home Loans) Ltd.

From the entry into force of European Banking Supervision in 2014 to 2023, HSBC Bank Malta has been designated as a Significant Institution and, as a consequence, has been directly supervised by the European Central Bank.

== See also ==
- HSBC (United Kingdom)
- HSBC Continental Europe
- List of banks in Malta

== Sources ==
Consiglio, John A. 2006. A history of banking in Malta, 1506-2005. Valletta: Progress Press.
