= APS Bank =

Maltese bank

- Type: Private
- Traded as: MSE: APS
- Industry: Banking; Financial services
- Predecessor: Unione Cattolica San Giuseppe
- Founded: 1910
- Headquarters: Birkirkara, Malta
- Key people: Marcel Cassar, CEO Martin Scicluna, Chairman
- Products: Commercial Banking; Investment Banking; Private Banking; Asset Management
- Owner: AROM Holdings Limited (Note: Majority shareholder) (54.67%), Archdiocese of Malta (12.52%)
- Number of employees: ~700
- Subsidiaries: APS Funds Sicav plc.
- Website: www.apsbank.com.mt

The APS Bank (Apostleship of Prayer Savings Bank), successor of the Unione Cattolica San Giuseppe, is a Maltese bank established in 1910 by a Jesuit, Fr. Michael Vella and in 1948 the bank's ownership was transferred to the Archdiocese of Malta and Gozo.

The bank was incorporated into a private limited liability company in 1970 and granted a commercial licence in 1990. Since then it has kept expanding its operations in a number of different directions. Today it employs some 700 staff working in the Head Office in Swatar and in the 12 branches across Malta and Gozo. APS Bank holds three subsidiaries, namely APS Funds SICAV plc, ReAPS Asset Management Limited and IvaLife Insurance Ltd.

In October 2010, culminating its 100-year anniversary celebrations, the bank inaugurated a modern seven storey Head Office block in Swatar, Birkirkara. APS Bank is an active member of European Federation of Ethical and Alternative Banks (FEBEA).

== History ==
The Lega dello Apostolato della Preghiera was set up on the initiative of the Jesuit Fr. Michele Vella, with the first meeting of the Committee held on 8 May 1910. The main aims were the setting up of a number of initiatives, all with an underlying social nature, namely:

- A savings bank, intended to help instil savings habits amongst the working classes;
- A mutual benefit society;
- A printing press;
- A publication of Il-Habib, a Maltese language periodical;
- An evening school for the teaching of languages, music and crafts;
- An emigration bureau to help Maltese citizens wishing to settle in other countries;
- Schemes for the free provision of food, medicines and medical care to people in need;
- A public lotto office;
- A recreational club for members.

The savings bank was set up immediately as the Cassa di Risparmio dell’Apostolato della Preghiera, the Apostolate of Prayer Savings Bank – the acronym deriving from which would eventually become the Bank's name – APS. The Bank accepted its first deposits on 7 December 1910, and in order to disseminate the Bank's ideals and principles, parish centres were set up in various towns and villages. Over the years, the profits from this Bank were utilised in order to implement and maintain the other social projects on the Lega's list of main aims.

Eventually, the Lega changed its name to Unione Cattolica San Giuseppe with the aim of being helping both in a spiritual and also in a practical manner, with the Bank becoming popularly known as Il-Bank ta’ San Gużepp.

During its first thirty years of operation, the Bank registered steady progress with deposits increasing substantially. However, the Second World War hampered the Bank's activities, as the parish centres had to be closed.

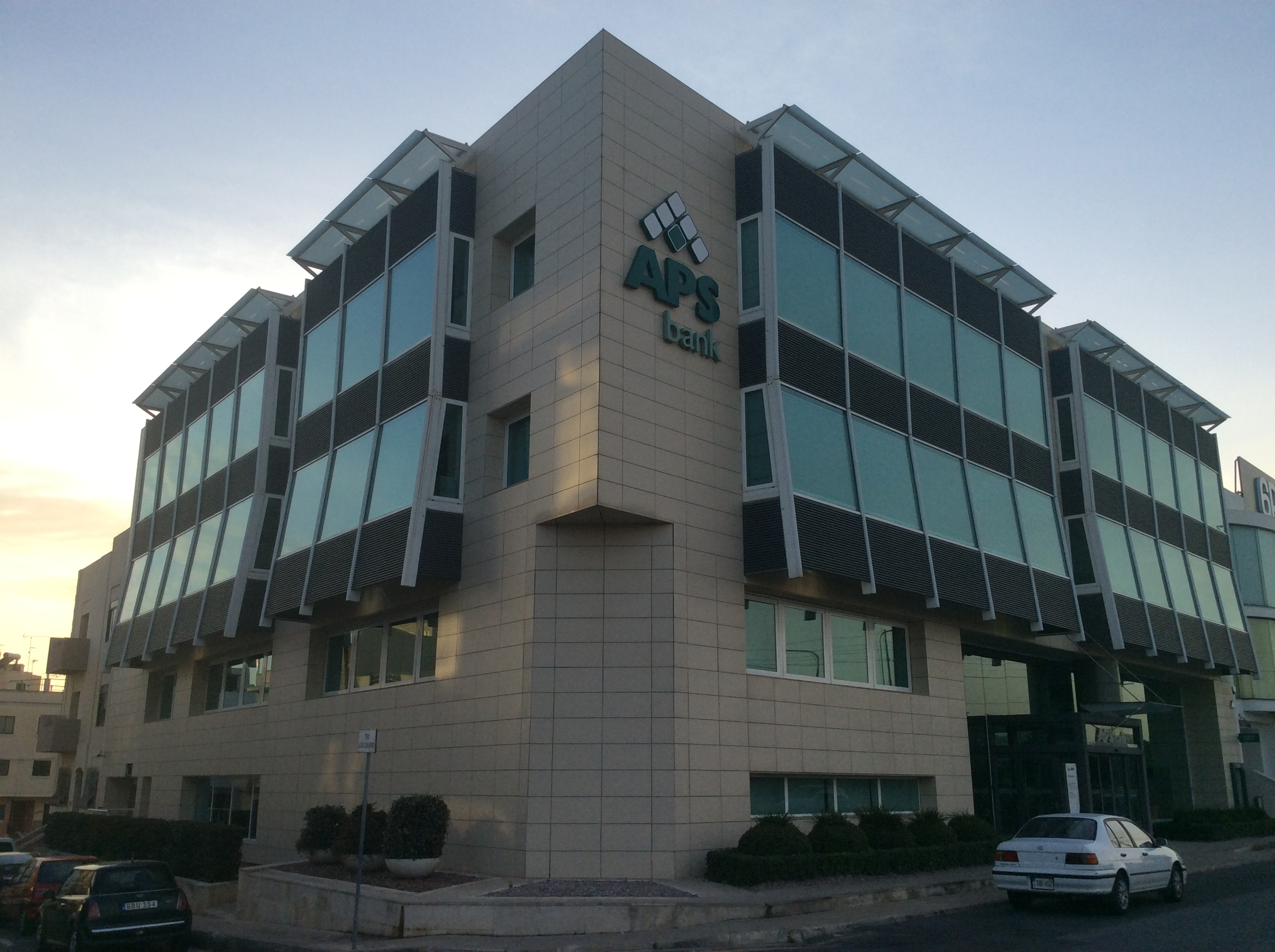
APS Bank Head Office in Swatar, Birkirkara, Malta

After the war, the Committee transferred the Unione with all its branches, including the Bank, to the Archdiocese of Malta. This was effected by a private deed dated 18 November 1947. Although the Bank kept a very low profile, progress was maintained. Along the years, the Bank contributed towards the implementation of various projects, such as the extension to Id-Dar tal-Kleru, and subsidies to various associations of a religious and cultural nature.

On 1 June 1970, APS Bank was incorporated as a private limited liability company with an initial authorised and issued share capital of 100,000 pounds. This enabled the Bank to widen its aims to increase its services. The Bank started operating as a commercial financial institution in 1991. It used monetary instruments with success to support depositors and borrowers, in particular mortgage holders, farmers and students. But it went further: its close contact with various economic sectors indicated the need for an institution to accelerate the restructuring process to face tougher competition from abroad. In response, the Bank set up APS Consult Ltd in 2006 to achieve this end.

In addition, the Bank set up APS Funds Sicav plc in 2008 both to diversify services and also to introduce the selling of ethical funds in the Maltese Islands. Ethical funds are subject to demand that is based on the inherent values of respective social groups. Their sale has to be preceded by the education of potential subscribers, whereby the specific differences between one such fund and another are clearly examined and explained.

The Bank also set up various branches and agencies, culminating in the new headquarters at Swatar, B’Kara in 2010.

== See also ==
- List of banks in the euro area
- List of banks in Malta
