= Outline of Malta =

Overview of and topical guide to Malta

The Flag of Malta

The Coat of arms of Malta

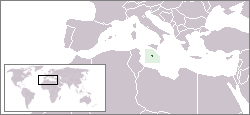
The location of Malta

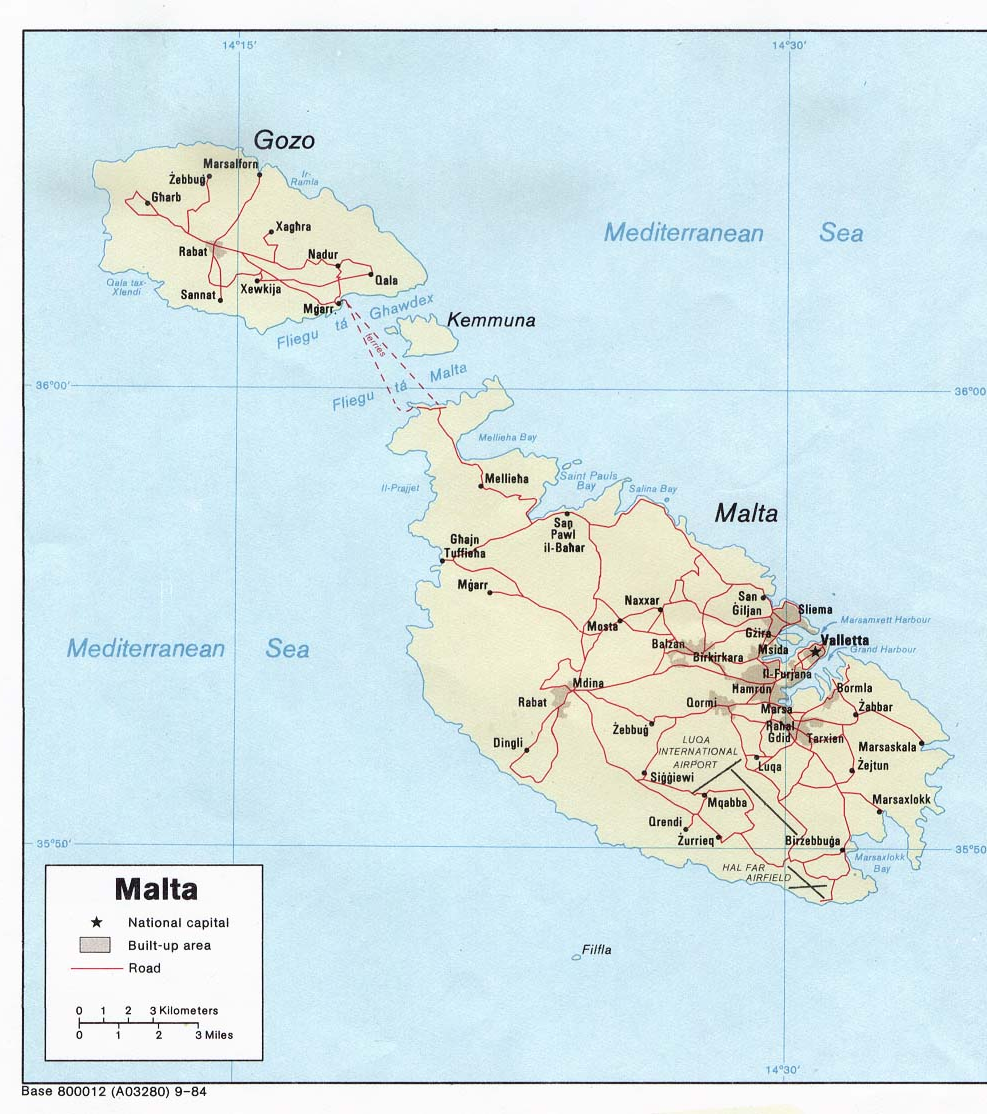
An enlargeable map of the Republic of Malta

The following outline is provided as an overview of and topical guide to Malta:

Malta is a small and densely populated sovereign island nation located in Europe, in the Mediterranean Sea. Malta comprises an archipelago of seven islands, of which the three largest are inhabited. Malta is located 93 km (58 mi) south of Sicily, and 288 km (179 mi) north of North Africa, giving the country a warm, Mediterranean climate. The nation's capital is the 16th century city of Valletta.

Throughout much of its history, Malta has been considered a crucial location due in large part to its position in the Mediterranean Sea. It was held by several ancient cultures including Sicilians, Romans, Phoenicians, Byzantines and others. The island is commonly associated with the Knights of St. John who ruled it. This, along with the historic pseudo-historic and religiously claimed shipwreck of St. Paul on the island, and since the 12th century ingrained a Roman Catholic legacy which is still the official religion in Malta today combined with secular values.

The country's official languages are Maltese and English; the former is the national language and the latter a legacy from Malta's period as a British colony. Malta gained independence in 1964 and is, as of 2025, a member of the Commonwealth of Nations, as well as the European Union, which it joined in 2004.

== General reference ==
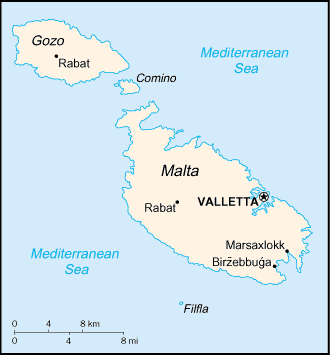
An enlargeable basic map of Malta

- Pronunciation: /ˈmɔːltə/ MAWL-tə, UK also /ˈmɒltə/ MOL-tə
- Common English country name: Malta
- Official English country name: The Republic of Malta
- Common endonym(s): Malta
- Official endonym(s): Repubblika ta' Malta
- Adjectival(s): Maltese
- Demonym(s): Maltese
- Etymology: Name of Malta
- ISO country codes: MT, MLT, 470
- ISO region codes: See ISO 3166-2:MT
- Internet country code top-level domain: .mt

== Geography of Malta ==
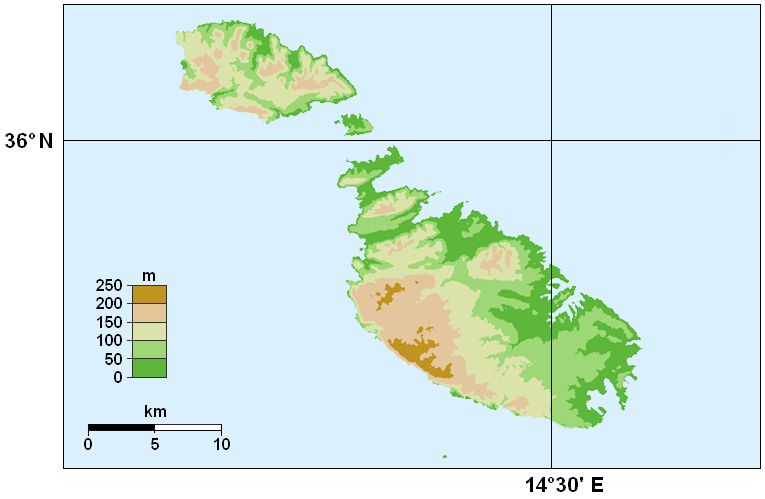
An enlargeable topographic map of Malta

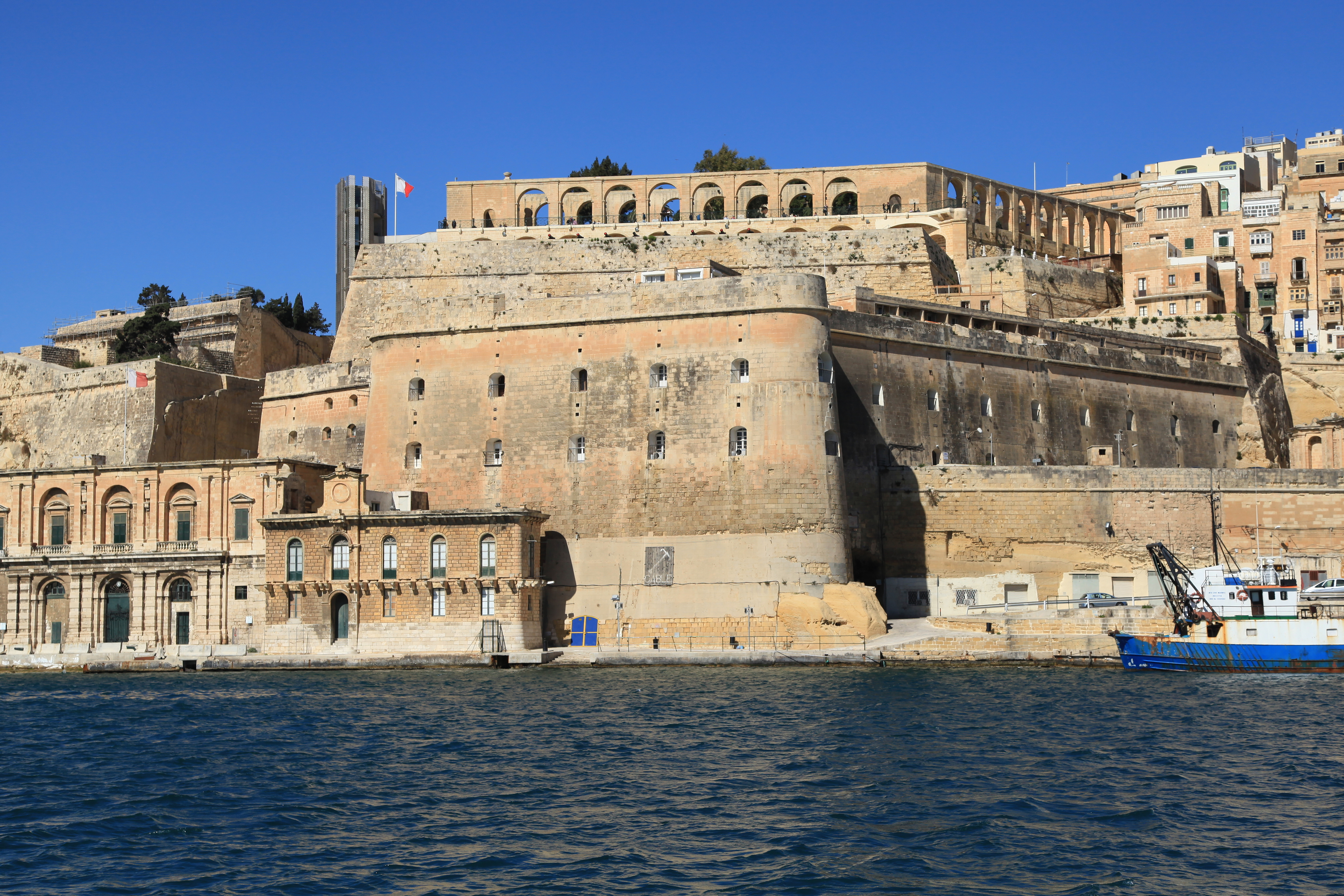
Valletta, with the Upper Barrakka Gardens in the background

Geography of Malta

- Malta is: an island country and a European microstate
- Location:
  - Northern Hemisphere and Eastern Hemisphere
  - Atlantic Ocean
    - Mediterranean Sea
  - Eurasia (though not on the mainland)
    - Europe
      - Southern Europe
  - Time zone: Central European Time (UTC+01), Central European Summer Time (UTC+02)
  - Extreme points of Malta
    - High: Ta' Dmejrek 253 m (830 ft)
    - Low: Mediterranean Sea 0 m
  - Land boundaries: none
  - Coastline: Mediterranean Sea 252.8 km
- Population of Malta: 493,559 (2019) - 167th most populous country
- Area of Malta: 316 km^{2}
- Atlas of Malta

=== Environment of Malta ===
- Climate of Malta
- Endemic Maltese wildlife
- Environmental issues in Malta
- Nature reserve
- Renewable energy in Malta
- Geology of Malta
- Protected areas of Malta
  - Biosphere reserves in Malta
  - National parks of Malta
- Wildlife of Malta
  - Flora of Malta
  - Fauna of Malta
    - Birds of Malta
    - Mammals of Malta

==== Natural geographic features of Malta ====
- Coastline of Malta
- Islands of Malta
  - Malta
  - Gozo
  - Comino
  - Filfla
  - Manoel Island
  - St Paul's Island
- Malta Channel
- Valleys of Malta
- World Heritage Sites in Malta

=== Regions of Malta ===
Regions of Malta

==== Ecoregions of Malta ====
Ecoregions in Malta

==== Administrative divisions of Malta ====
Administrative divisions of Malta

- Districts of Malta

===== Districts of Malta =====
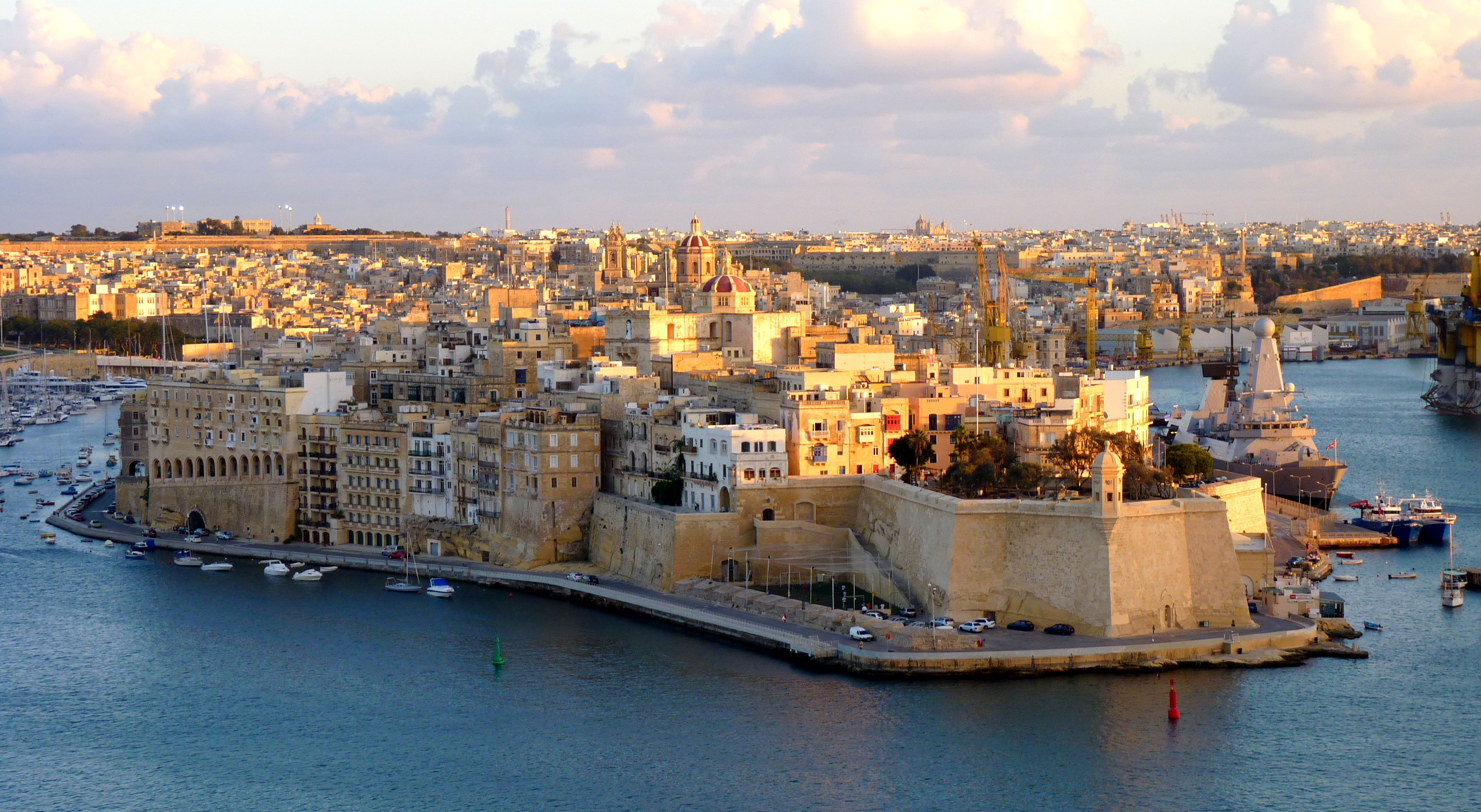
View of Senglea, one of the Three Cities, from the Upper Barrakka Gardens

Districts of Malta

===== Municipalities of Malta =====
- Capital of Malta: Valletta
- Cities of Malta
  - Three Cities

=== Demography of Malta ===
Demographics of Malta

== Government and politics of Malta ==
Politics of Malta

- Form of government: multi-party representative democratic parliamentary republic
- Capital of Malta: Valletta (de facto)
- Elections in Malta
- Political parties in Malta

=== Branches of the Republic of Malta ===
- Head of state: President of Malta

==== Executive branch of Malta ====
Government of Malta

- Head of Government: Prime Minister of Malta,
- Cabinet of Malta

==== Legislative branch of Malta ====
- Speaker of the House of Representatives of Malta
- House of Representatives of Malta
  - Leader of the House of Representatives of Malta
  - Leader of the Opposition (Malta)

==== Judicial branch of Malta ====
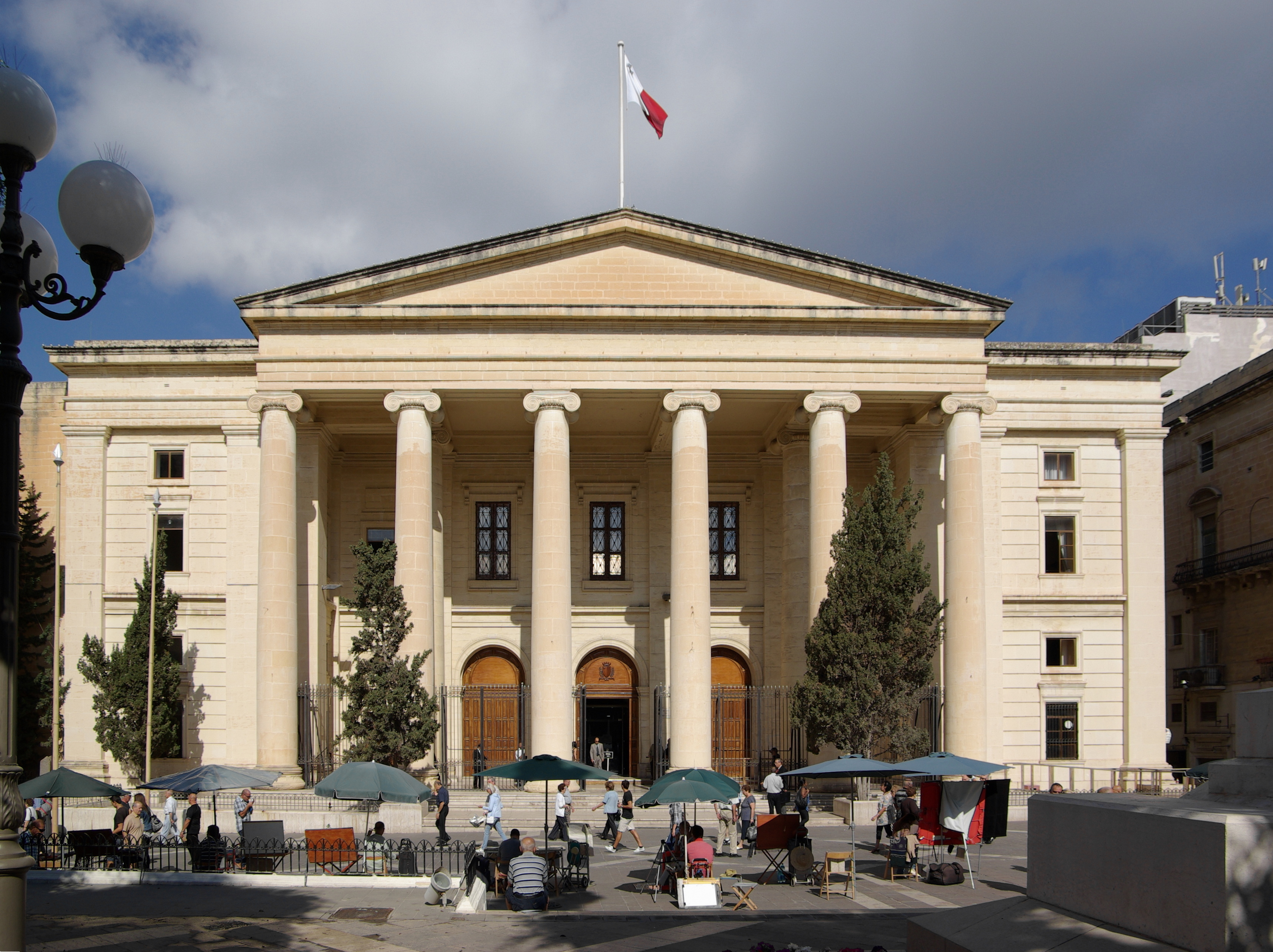
View of the Courts of Justice building (Valletta) building

Judiciary of Malta

- Primus Inter Pares of Judicial Branch: Chief Justice of Malta
- Law Courts and Tribunals of Malta
- Commission for the Administration of Justice of Malta
- Castellania (former courthouse)

=== Foreign relations of Malta ===
Foreign relations of Malta

- Diplomatic missions of Malta

==== International organization membership ====
The Republic of Malta is a member of:

- Australia Group
- Commonwealth of Nations
- Council of Europe (CE)
- Economic and Monetary Union (EMU)
- Euro-Atlantic Partnership Council (EAPC)
- European Bank for Reconstruction and Development (EBRD)
- European Investment Bank (EIB)
- European Union (EU)
- Food and Agriculture Organization (FAO)
- International Atomic Energy Agency (IAEA)
- International Bank for Reconstruction and Development (IBRD)
- International Civil Aviation Organization (ICAO)
- International Criminal Court (ICCt)
- International Criminal Police Organization (Interpol)
- International Federation of Red Cross and Red Crescent Societies (IFRCS)
- International Finance Corporation (IFC)
- International Fund for Agricultural Development (IFAD)
- International Labour Organization (ILO)
- International Maritime Organization (IMO)
- International Mobile Satellite Organization (IMSO)
- International Monetary Fund (IMF)
- International Olympic Committee (IOC)
- International Organization for Migration (IOM)
- International Organization for Standardization (ISO)
- International Red Cross and Red Crescent Movement (ICRM)
- International Telecommunication Union (ITU)
- International Telecommunications Satellite Organization (ITSO)
- International Trade Union Confederation (ITUC)
- Inter-Parliamentary Union (IPU)
- Multilateral Investment Guarantee Agency (MIGA)
- Nuclear Suppliers Group (NSG)
- Organization for Security and Cooperation in Europe (OSCE)
- Organisation for the Prohibition of Chemical Weapons (OPCW)
- Partnership for Peace (PFP)
- Permanent Court of Arbitration (PCA)
- Schengen Convention
- United Nations (UN)
- United Nations Conference on Trade and Development (UNCTAD)
- United Nations Educational, Scientific, and Cultural Organization (UNESCO)
- United Nations Industrial Development Organization (UNIDO)
- Universal Postal Union (UPU)
- World Confederation of Labour (WCL)
- World Customs Organization (WCO)
- World Federation of Trade Unions (WFTU)
- World Health Organization (WHO)
- World Intellectual Property Organization (WIPO)
- World Meteorological Organization (WMO)
- World Tourism Organization (UNWTO)
- World Trade Organization (WTO)

=== Law and order in Malta ===
Law of Malta

- Capital punishment in Malta
- Constitution of Malta
- Crime in Malta
- Human rights in Malta
  - LGBT rights in Malta
  - Freedom of religion in Malta
- Law enforcement in Malta

=== Military of Malta ===
Military of Malta

- Command
  - Commander-in-chief: President of Malta
  - Prime Minister of Malta
  - Chief of Staff: Brigadier of The Armed Forces of Malta
- Armed Forces of Malta
  - Army of Malta
  - Navy of Malta
  - Air Force of Malta
  - Special forces of Malta
- Military history of Malta
- Military ranks of Malta

=== Local government in Malta ===
Local government in Malta

== History of Malta ==
- Military history of Malta
- Monarchs of Malta

== Culture of Malta ==
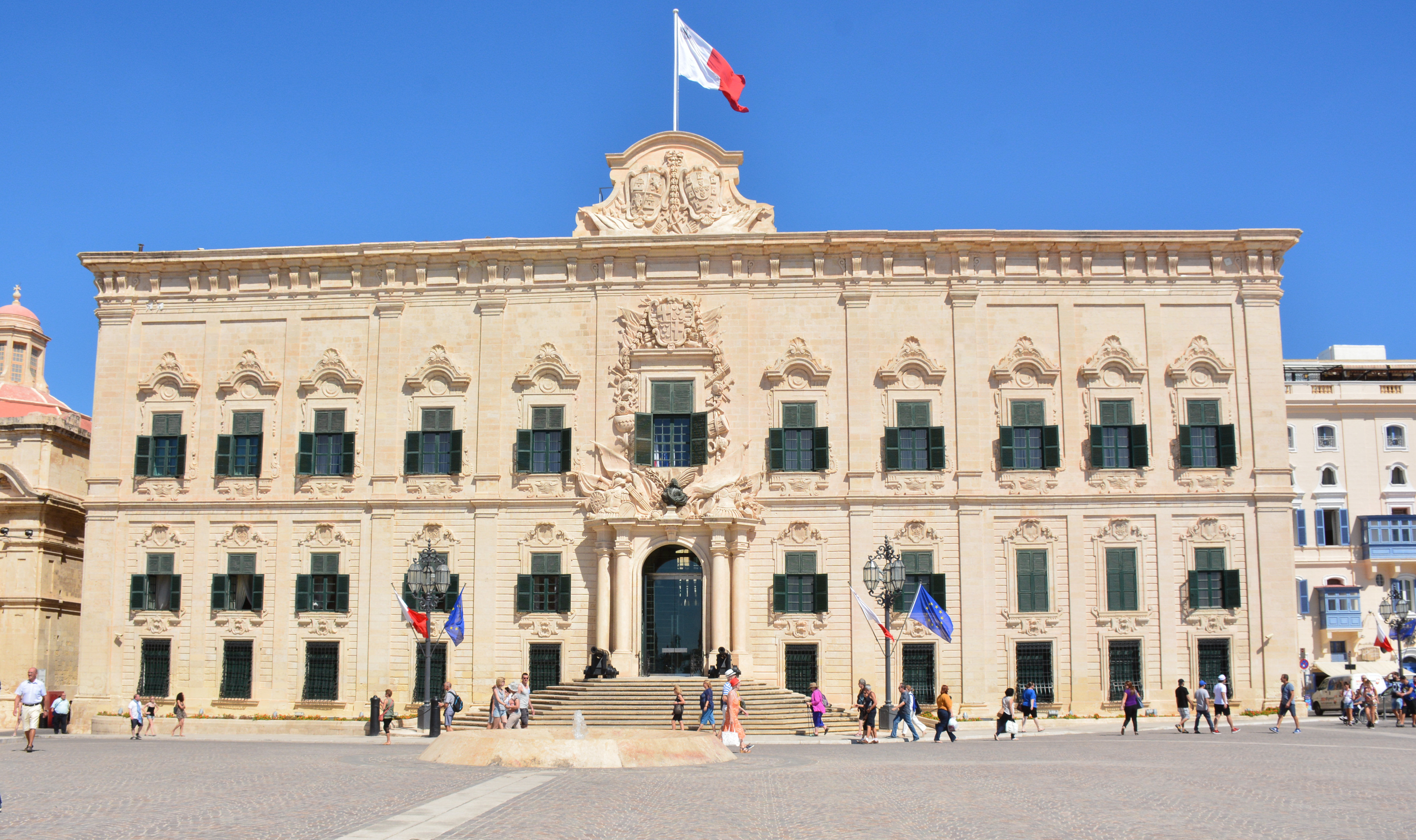
Auberge de Castille, a fine example of Maltese Baroque architecture

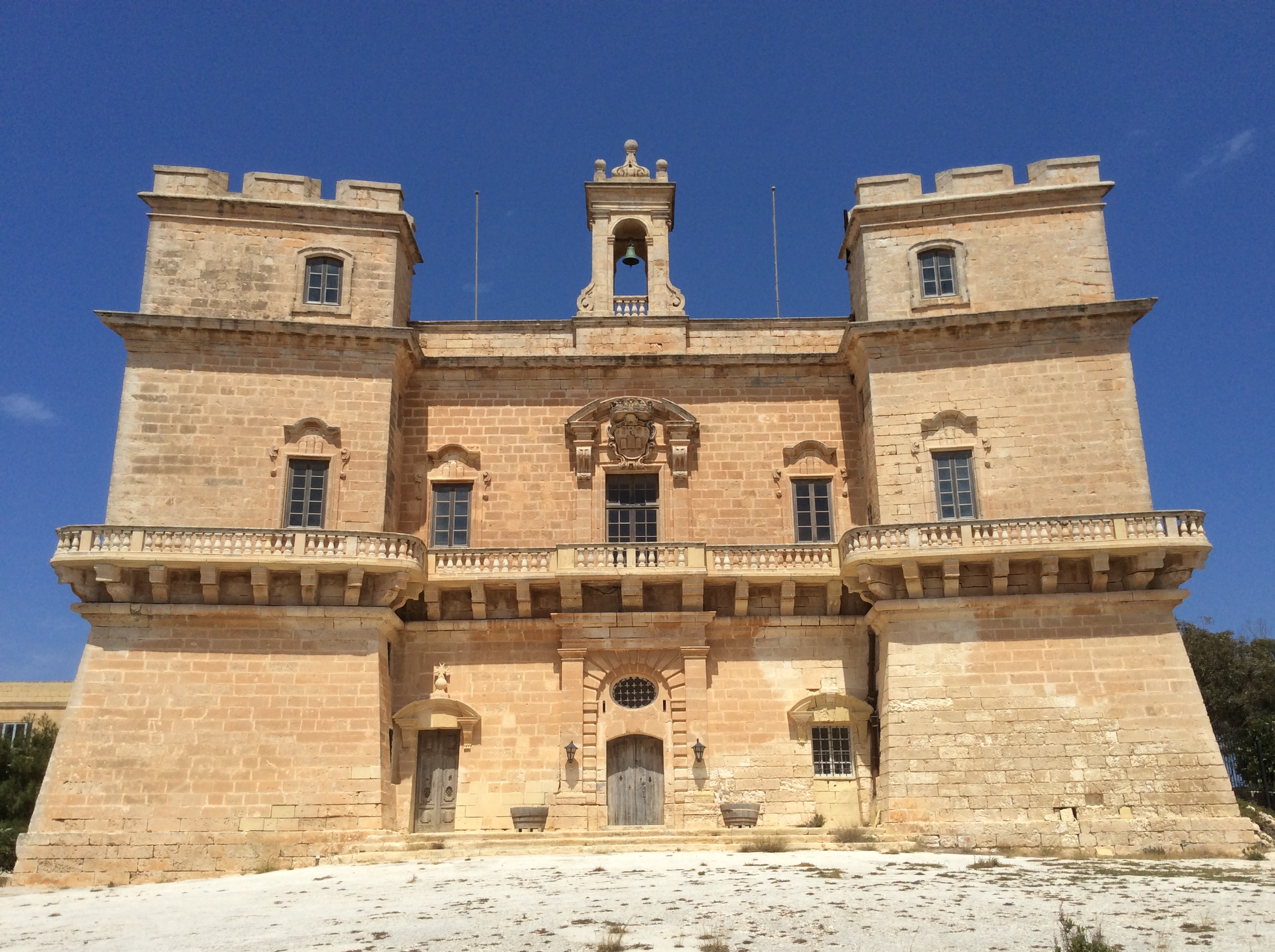
Selmun Palace, a different example of Baroque architecture

Culture of Malta

- Architecture of Malta
  - Maltese Baroque architecture
- Cuisine of Malta
- Festivals in Malta
- Languages of Malta
  - Maltenglish
  - Maltese language
- Media in Malta
  - Newspapers in Malta
  - Radio stations in Malta
  - Television in Malta
- Monuments in Malta
- Museums in Malta
- National symbols of Malta
  - Coat of arms of Malta
  - Flag of Malta
  - National anthem of Malta
- People of Malta
- Prostitution in Malta
- Public holidays in Malta
- Records of Malta
- Religion in Malta
  - Christianity in Malta
  - Hinduism in Malta
  - Islam in Malta
  - Judaism in Malta
  - Sikhism in Malta
- World Heritage Sites in Malta

=== Art in Malta ===
- Art in Malta
- Cinema of Malta
- List of Maltese artists
- Literature of Malta
- Maltese folklore
- Music of Malta
- Philosophy in Malta
- Theatre in Malta

=== Sports in Malta ===
Sports in Malta

- Football in Malta
- Handball Malta
- Malta at the Olympics

== Economy and infrastructure of Malta ==
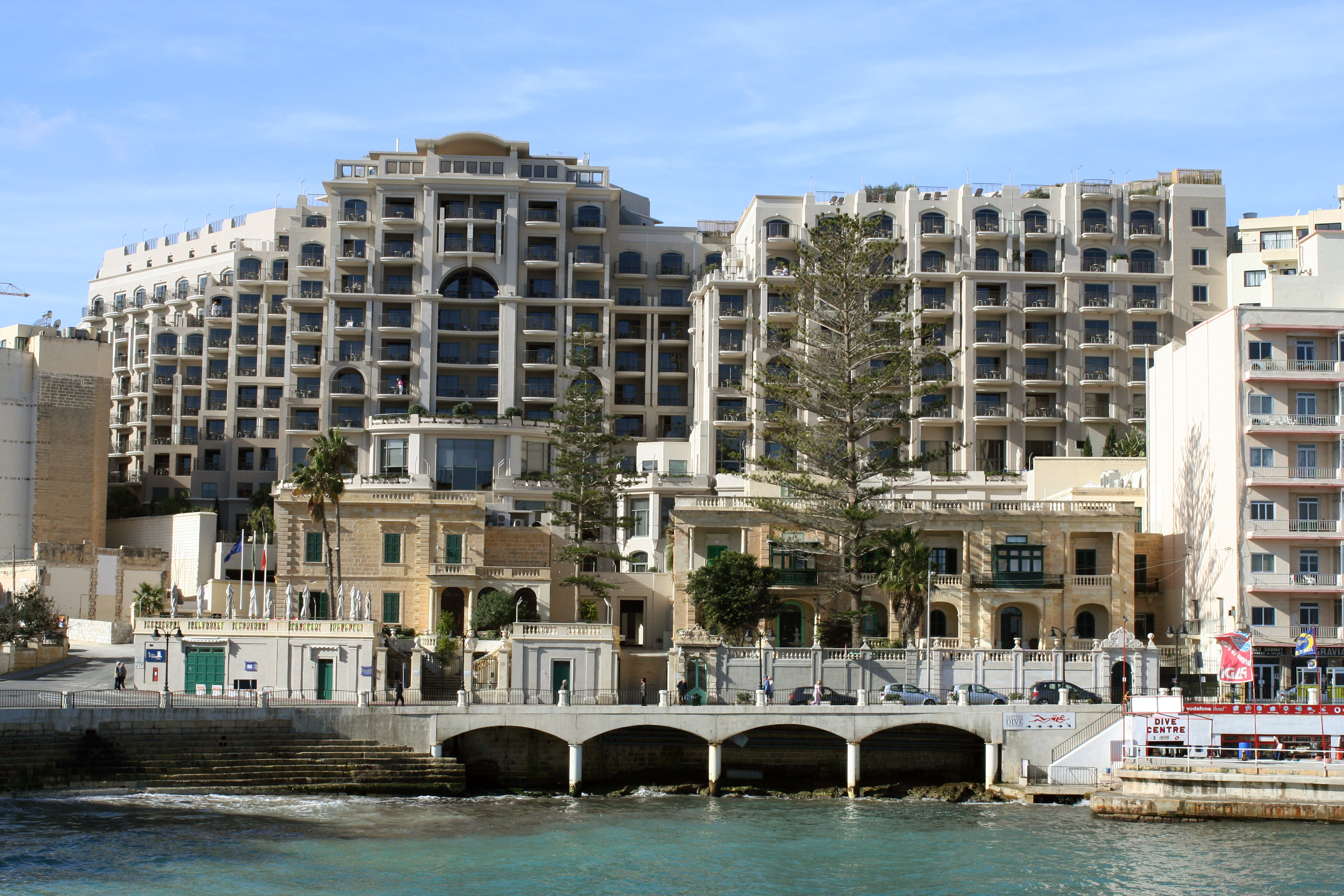
Le Meridien St. Julians Hotel & Spa, one of the 5 star hotels in Malta

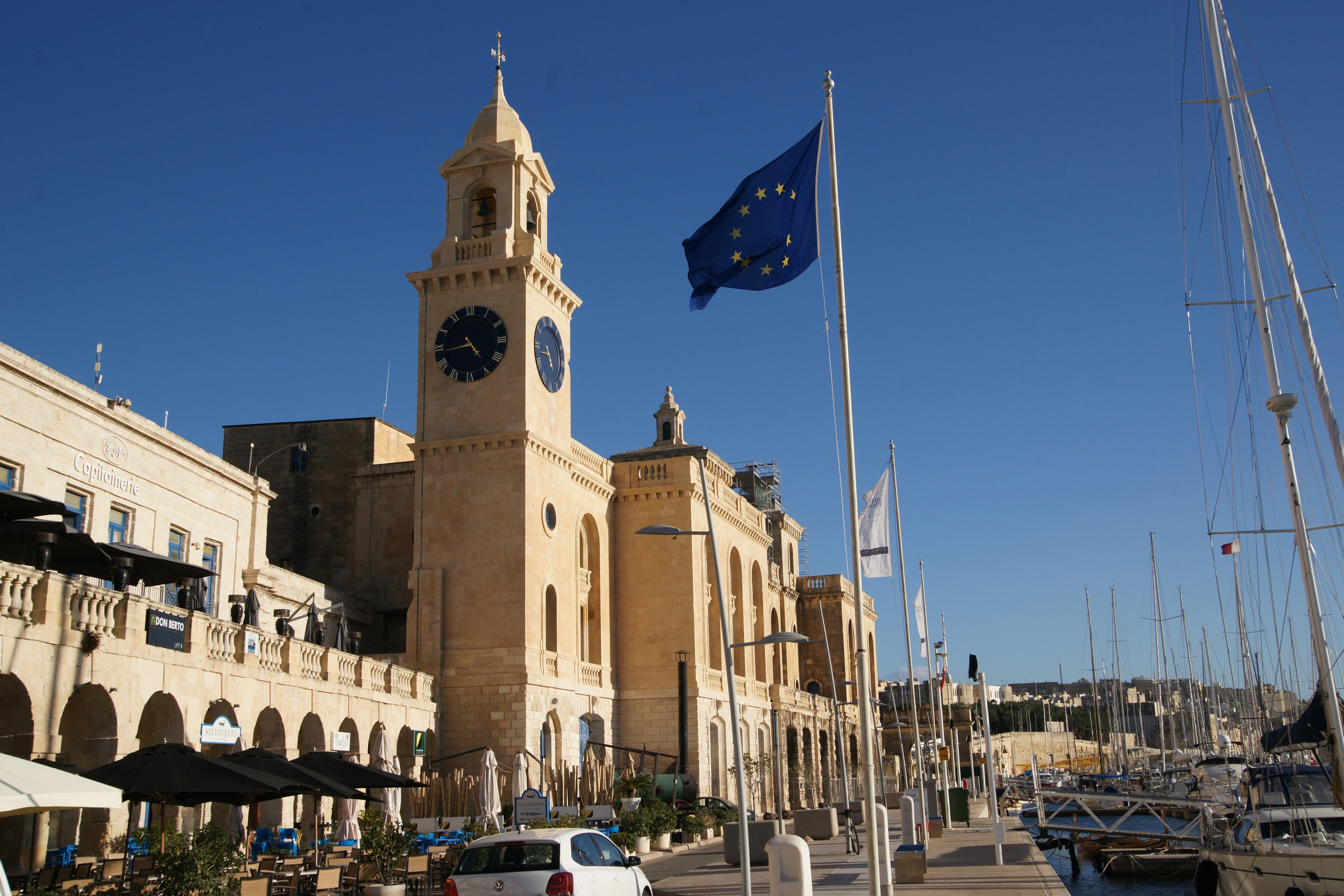
The Malta Maritime Museum as viewed from the Birgu waterfront

Economy of Malta

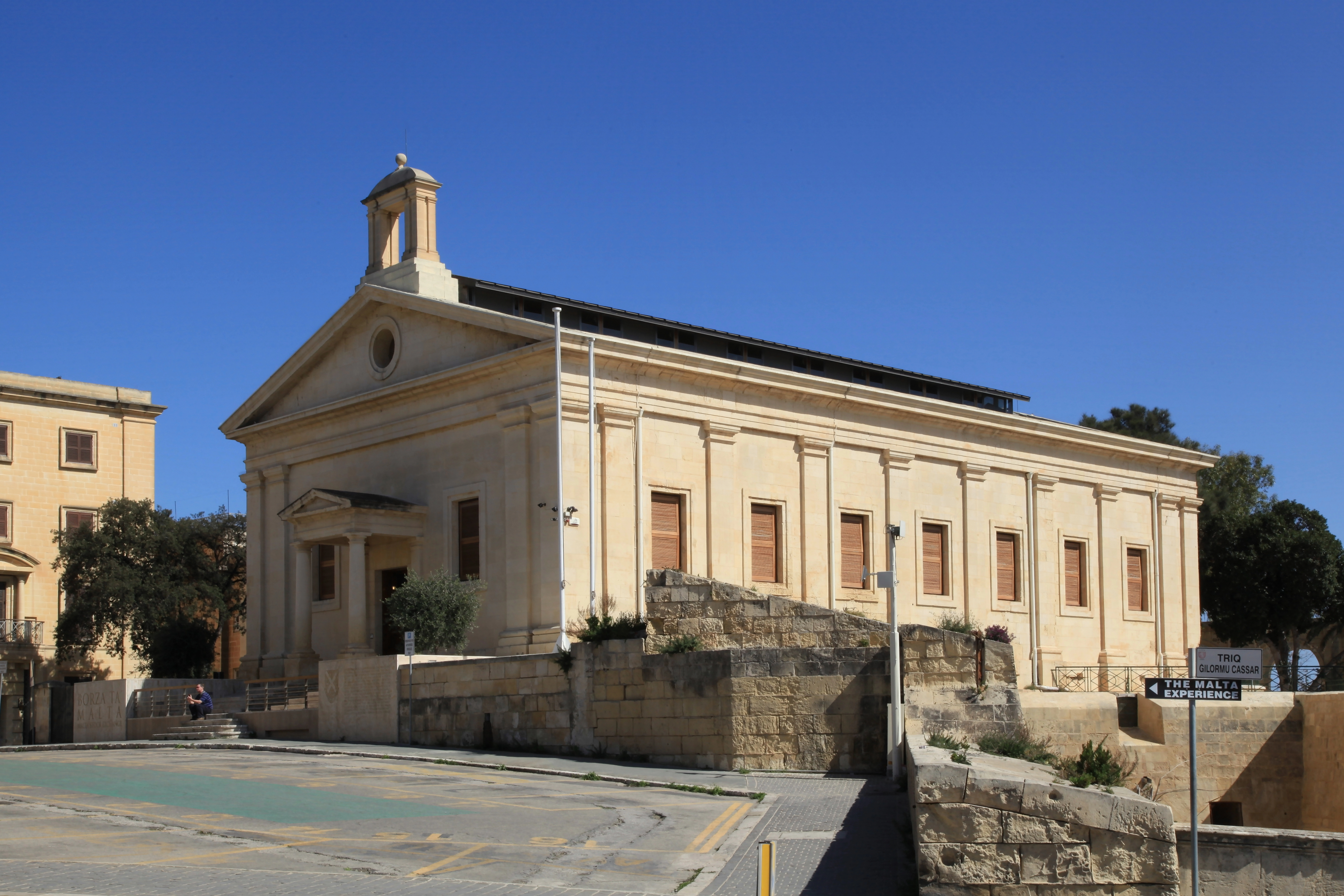
The Malta Stock Exchange (Borza ta' Malta) at Pjazza Kastilja in Valletta

- Economic rank, by nominal GDP (2007): 125th (one hundred and twenty fifth)
- Agriculture in Malta
- Banking in Malta
  - Central Bank of Malta
- Communications in Malta
  - Internet in Malta
- Companies of Malta
- Currency of Malta: Euro (see also: Euro topics)
- Maltese euro coins
- Previous currency: Maltese lira
  - ISO 4217: EUR
- Energy in Malta
  - Energy policy of Malta
  - Oil industry in Malta
- Health care in Malta
- Mining in Malta
- Malta Stock Exchange
- Tourism in Malta
  - Hotels in Malta
  - Museums in Malta
  - Visa policy of Malta
- Transport in Malta
  - Airports in Malta
  - Rail transport in Malta
  - Roads in Malta

== Education in Malta ==
Education in Malta

- University of Malta

== See also ==
- Index of Malta-related articles
- List of international rankings
- Member state of the Commonwealth of Nations
- Member state of the European Union
- Member state of the United Nations
- Outline of Europe
- Outline of geography
- WikiProject Malta - Central place for contributing to Malta Articles.
