= List of companies of Malta =

This list includes notable companies with primary headquarters located in Malta. The industry and sector follow the Industry Classification Benchmark taxonomy. Organizations which have ceased operations are included and noted as defunct.

Notable companies Status: P=Private, S=State; A=Active, D=Defunct
Name	Industry	Sector	Headquarters	Founded	Notes	Status	
Air Malta	Consumer services	Airlines	Luqa	1973	Airline	P	A
APS Bank	Financials	Banks	Swatar	1910	Bank	P	A
Bank of Valletta	Financials	Banks	Santa Venera	1974	Bank	P	A
Central Bank of Malta	Financials	Banks	Valletta	1968	Central bank	S	A
Db Group	Real Estate	Hotel and Lodging REIT	Mellieha	1980s	Hotels, catering, healthcare	P	A
Emmanuel Delicata	Consumer goods	Distillers & vintners	Valletta	1907	Winery	P	A
GO	Telecommunications	Fixed line telecommunications	Marsa	1997	Telephone, DSL	P	A
HSBC Bank Malta	Financials	Banks	Valletta	1882	Bank, part of HSBC (UK)	P	A
Lombard Bank	Financials	Banks	Valletta	1969	Bank	P	A
MaltaPost	Industrials	Delivery services	Marsa	1998	Post	P	A
Medavia	Consumer services	Airlines	Luqa	1978	Airline	P	A
Media.link Communications	Consumer services	Publishing	Pietà	UNKNOWN	Mass media publisher	P	A
Melita	Telecommunications	Fixed line telecommunications	Birkirkara	1992	Internet, telecom	P	A
Multilotto	Consumer services	Gambling	St Julian's	2012	Gambling	P	A
One Productions	Consumer services	Broadcasting & entertainment	Marsa	1994	Production	P	A
Polidano Group	Industrials	Construction	Ħal Farruġ, Luqa	1987	Construction	P	A
Sagħtar	Consumer services	Publishing	Valletta	1971	Magazine	P	A
Simonds Farsons Cisk	Consumer goods	Brewers	Birkirkara	1928	Brewery	P	A
Tumas Group	Industrials	Construction	Portomaso Business Tower, St Julian's	1987	Construction	P	A
Unibet	Consumer services	Gambling	Gżira	1997	Gambling	P	A
Epic	Telecommunications	Mobile telecommunications	Luqa	1989	Part of Monaco Telecom	P	A

== See also ==
- Economy of Malta
- List of airlines of Malta
- List of hotels in Malta
- List of newspapers in Malta
- List of radio stations in Malta
- List of companies listed on the Malta Stock Exchange
