= List of companies listed on the Malta Stock Exchange =

The following table lists companies admitted to the Malta Stock Exchange’s Official List (Equities), based on official data as of mid-2025.

Company name	Stock code	Industry / Sub‑sector
APS Bank plc	APS	Banking
AX Real Estate plc	AXR	Real Estate
Bank of Valletta	BOV	Banking
FIMBank	FIM	Banking
GO plc	GO	Telecommunications
Grand Harbour Marina plc	GHM	Recreational Services
HSBC Bank Malta	HSB	Banking
International Hotel Investments	IHI	Hospitality
Lombard Bank Malta plc	LOM	Banking
Loqus Holdings plc	LQS	Software
Lifestar Holding plc	LSR	Insurance
LifeStar Insurance plc	LSI	Insurance
Malita Investments plc	MLT	Real Estate
Malta International Airport plc	MIA	Transport Infrastructure
Malta Properties Company plc	MPC	Real Estate
MaltaPost	MTP	Postal & Delivery Services
Main Street Complex plc	MSC	Real Estate
MAPFRE Middlesea plc	MMS	Insurance
Medserv plc	MDS	Oil & Gas Logistics
MIDI plc	MDI	Real Estate
PG plc	PG	Retail / Real Estate
Plaza Centres plc	PZC	Real Estate
RS2 Software plc	RS2	Software
RS2 PLC Pref	—	Software
Santumas Shareholdings plc	STS	Investment Holdings
Simonds Farsons Cisk plc	SFC	Food & Beverage
Tigné Mall plc	TML	Real Estate
Trident Estates plc	TRI	Real Estate
VBL plc	VBL	Hospitality / Real Estate
BMIT Technologies plc	BMIT	Software / IT Services
Harvest Technologies plc	HRV	Software / IT Services
Hili Properties plc	HLI	Real Estate
M&Z plc	MZ	FMCG / Distribution
The Convenience Shop (Holding) plc	CVS	Retail

== See also ==
- List of companies of Malta
