= Anthony Galdes =

Anthony P. Galdes

Governor of the Central Bank of Malta
- In office 3 June 1987 – 2 June 1993
- Prime Minister: Eddie Fenech Adami
- Preceded by: Henry C. de Gabriele
- Succeeded by: Francis J. Vassallo

Personal details
- Born: 1931 Valletta, Malta
- Died: 17 July 2005 (aged 74)
- Spouse: Joyce

Anthony P. Galdes (1931 – 17 July 2005) was a Maltese economist. He was Governor of the Central Bank of Malta from June 1987 to May 1993, the first Maltese to serve in the post.

== Life and career ==
Galdes joined the civil service in 1949, working at the Treasury and the Finance Ministry. As of 1969 he was involved in formulating government economic policy and budget planning.

From 1975 to 1979 Galdes served as permanent secretary at the Ministry of Finance and as member of the Education Commission and its standing committee. He was in charge of the introduction of the two-thirds pension scheme.

In 1987, Prime Minister Eddie Fenech Adami proposed Galdes as the first Maltese Governor of the Central Bank of Malta, a post which he held for two three-year terms. As Governor, Galdes was also Malta's representative on the Board of Governors of the International Monetary Fund and was responsible for preparatory work to set up the Malta Stock Exchange. Galdes also joined the 1990 Public Service Reform Commission and the Commission for the Administration of Justice.

In 1993, he was awarded the National Order of Merit of the Republic of Malta.

In 1994, upon expiration of the presidential term of Censu Tabone, his name was among those suggested by Prime Minister Eddie Fenech Adami as a non-partisan new head of state. Finally, Parliament elected Ugo Mifsud Bonnici to the post.

Galdes also served on the board of Simonds Farsons Cisk plc (for 10 years as vice-chairman and for 2 as director) and of the SFC staff pension.

In 1999, Galdes was appointed chairman of the National Commission on Welfare Reform, from which he resigned in December 2001 as he felt the government had undermined their work.

Galdes died on 17 July 2005, at the age of 74.
