= Emanuel Ellul =

Maltese economist

Governor of the Central Bank of Malta
- In office 1 October 1997 – 30 September 1999
- Prime Minister: Alfred Sant, Eddie Fenech Adami
- Preceded by: Francis J. Vassallo
- Succeeded by: Michael C. Bonello

Personal details
- Education: Oxford University

Emanuel Ellul is a Maltese economist. He was Governor of the Central Bank of Malta from 1997 to 1999.

Ellul started as an apprentice in the Malta Dockyard in 1951, where he also worked as tradesman. Awarded a scholarship, in October 1961 he studied politics and economics at Oxford University, and then worked for one year at the research department of the Trades Union Congress.

Upon his return to Malta, he was recruited by the General Workers' Union. He then served for 30 years at the Central Bank of Malta, up to being appointed Governor by Prime Minister Alfred Sant as of October 1997 - a role which he held for two years before retiring.

In 2000 Ellul joined the cabinet of Eddie Fenech Adami as adviser to the Minister of Finance, and chairman of the Government Privatisation Unit. He managed some of the most important privatisations, including Maltacom (now Go), the lotteries department (now Maltco) and the shipyards (now Palumbo). He resigned from the role in June 2013, reportedly due to clashes with Economics Minister Chris Cardona over the independence of the unit.

Ellul is considered by many as one of the best economic minds on the island. Along his career, Ellul was also director at a series of companies including Middlesea Valletta Life, the Malta Drydocks Corporation (in 2000) and Governor at MCAST. In 2013 he was appointed consultant to Petromal Company Limited and Enemed Co Ltd and, in 2015, was appointed a member of the Resolution Committee of the Malta Financial Services Authority.
