= Telecommunications in Malta =

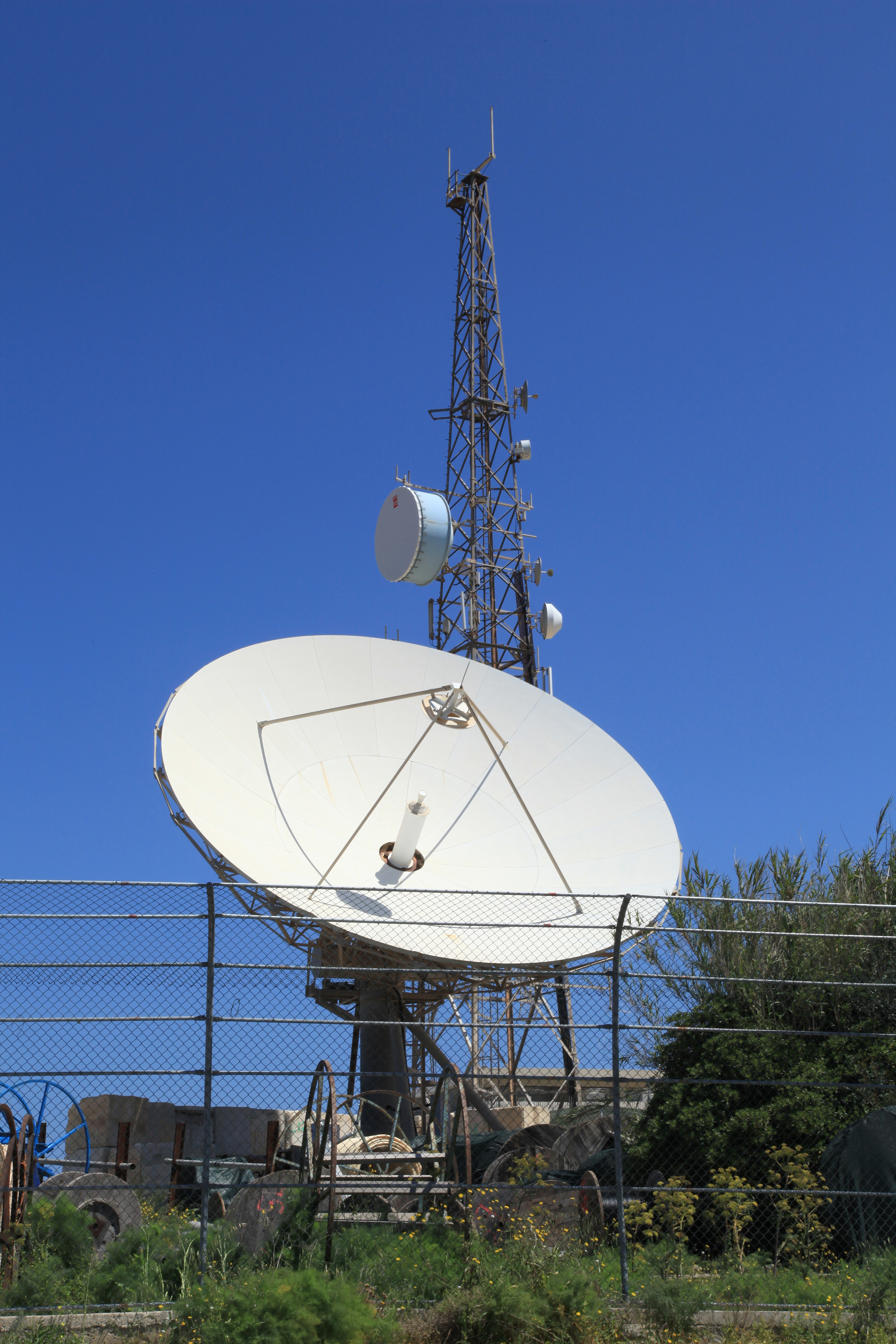
Melita plc at Madliena, Swieqi.

This article is an overview of telecommunications in Malta.

== Telephone ==
Telephones - main lines in use: 259,000 (2022)

Telephones - mobile cellular: 702,000 (2022)

Telephone system: automatic system satisfies normal requirements
domestic: submarine cables and microwave radio relay between islands
international: 2 submarine cables; satellite earth station - 1 Intelsat (Atlantic Ocean)

== Radio ==
Radio broadcast stations: AM 1, FM 18, shortwave 6 (1999)

Radios: 255,000 (1997)

Amateur radio operators:
Approx. 500

Amateur radio repeaters:
1 HF ALE EchoLink Gateway (9H1BBS-L) DTMF Access 145300 CTCSS 77 Hz (Owned by G0DEO/9H1IA)
1 VHF/UHF 9H1IA-L Frequency Agile CrossBand Link CTCSS 151.4 Hz (Owned by G0DEO/9H1IA)
1 VHF (9H1BBS 145.750 MHz CTCSS 77 Hz (Owned by G0DEO/9H1IA)
1 UHF (9H1BBS 433.175 MHz CTCSS 77 Hz (Owned by G0DEO/9H1IA)
2 Microwave Amateur Television ( ATV ) Repeaters ( 9H1ATV built by 9H1LO and run by MARL and 9H1LO/r built and run by 9H1LO )

Amateur radio beacons:
1 HF 6 Meater Beacon 9H1SIX 50.023 MHz JM75fv (Run by MARL Club)
1 HF 10 Meter Band CW Beacon 9H1LO/B on 28.223 MHz
1 HF 30 Meter Band QRSS Beacon 9H1LO/B on 10.140.90 MHz
1 HF 17 Meter Band PSK31 Beacon 9H1LO/B on 18.110.15 MHz
1 VHF 2 Meter Band Beacon 9H1LO/B on 144.500 MHz (currently summer months only)

== Television ==
Television broadcast stations: 6 (2000)

Televisions: 280,000 (1997)

== Internet ==
Internet Service Providers (ISPs): 17 (2005)

Broadband Wireless Internet Service Provider Licenses: 3 (2005)

Internet users: 461,100 (2021)

Country code (Top level domain): .mt

== Broadband Providers ==
Fixed-line market share by subscription
Company	Market share
GO	47.2%
Melita	46.1%
Epic	6.1%
Vanilla Telecoms	0.1%

Mobile Market Share by subscription
Company	Market share
Epic	42.2%
GO	35.4%
Melita	22.4%
