= Db Group =

db Group
- Industry: Hospitality, Real estate
- Founded: 1984; 42 years ago
- Founder: Silvio Debono
- Key people: Silvio Debono, executive chairman; Arthur Gauci, CEO; Robert Debono, executive director
- Revenue: €88.7 million (2024)
- Number of employees: 6,184 (2024)
- Website: dbgroupmalta.com

The db Group is largest hotel holding in Malta, with over 3,500 beds and 6,184 employees in 2024. It was founded and is still owned by Silvio Debono and his family from Mellieha.

== History ==
According to his account, Debono started as waiter and a barman in the early 1980s, before taking on a small tearoom, which he turned into a successful restaurant, whose owner asked him to become a partner. He went on opening a bar, a discotheque, and a pizzeria. He then opened an 80-room hotel in Mellieha, bought the Tunny Net restaurant, and a 3-star hotel. He obtained a bank guarantee from Thomson in London to open a 95-apartment complex. Later he contacted the Hard Rock Café franchise in Orlando, Florida, opening the first Hard Rock Café in Malta. He also established partnerships with the Accor Hotel Group, and RIU Hotels & Resorts.

In the late 2010s, db Group had become the largest hotel operator in Malta, with over 3,500 beds and 2,850 employees. In April 2017 the db Group issued a €65 million 10-year Bond at a fixed coupon of 4.35%m, which was listed on the Malta Stock Exchange one month later.

On 11 March 2017, Silvio Debono filed 19 libel suits against Daphne Caruana Galizia - one per each line in a post that the journalist had written about the highly controversial ITS land deal at St George's Bay. Caruana Galizia had noted that Debono exploited a legal loophole allowing him to file a separate case for each article or comment, regardless on whether they had the same author and content. Debono and the family of the slain journalist reached an out-of-court settlement in 2021.

== Companies ==
=== Real estate ===
- db San Gorg Property Limited
- Kika Construction Company Limited
- Kika Developments Company Limited
- Siar Property Investments Limited
- Ghadira Property Investment Limited

=== Hotels ===
- db Seabank Resort + Spa
- db San Antonio Hotel + Spa
- Starbucks Malta
- Hard Rock Café Malta
- Porto Azzurro
- Adeera Complex – Amami – Blu Beach – Westreme
- db City Centre at St. George's Bay, in St. Julian's - former Institute for Tourism Studies
- Nine Lives
- Aki

=== Contract catering ===
- Sky Gourmet Malta Limited
- Malta Healthcare Caterers Limited

=== Healthcare ===
- Healthmark
- Health Service Group Limited
- Support Services Limited
