= Francis J. Vassallo =

Maltese economist

Governor of the Central Bank of Malta
- In office 1 October 1997 – 30 September 1999
- Prime Minister: Alfred Sant, Eddie Fenech Adami
- Preceded by: Francis J. Vassallo
- Succeeded by: Michael C. Bonello

Personal details
- Born: October 3, 1948 (age 78) Mdina, Malta
- Spouse: Erminia (Mimici) née Miceli Farrugia
- Children: 3
- Education: Royal University of Malta

Francis J. Vassallo is a Maltese economist. He was Governor of the Central Bank of Malta from 1992 to 1997. He is also chairman of his own corporate services business Francis J. Vassallo & Associates Ltd.

== Early life and education ==
Francis J. Vassallo was born in Mdina. He graduated in economics at the Lyceum and the Royal University of Malta in 1970.

== Career ==
Vassallo started his career in Milan at the analysis department of Chase Manhattan Bank. He moved to New York teaching credit analysis, still at Chase. He was transferred to London in 1979 where he specialized in precious and non-ferrous metals. In 1983, he became marketing manager of Chase's Geneva-based private banking arm and to the boards of Chase Bank & Trust in the Channel Islands and Chase Manhattan SA in Luxembourg. He was transferred to Spain in 1988, and appointed general manager of Chase Manhattan Private Bank in Switzerland (overseeing Southern Europe) in 1991.

In 1993, Vassallo left Chase Manhattan to take up the Governorship of the Central Bank of Malta. Vassallo was Governor from 1993 to 1997.

In 1998 Vassallo founded his own company, Francis J. Vassallo & Associates Ltd (FJVA), a corporate services provider licensed by the Malta Financial Services Authority (MFSA). The company group has since branched out, via FJV Fiduciary Limited and FJV Management Limited, into tax, trusts, foundations, regulatory advisory services and yacht registrations.

In 2003, when BAWAG P.S.K. first opened a Maltese subsidiary, Vassallo took the chairmanship of the new company.

Francis J. Vassallo was also a member of the board of directors of FIMBank plc in 2019.

== Private life ==
In 2000 Francis J. Vassallo joined the Order of Malta as a Knight of Magistral Grace. In November 2015 he took vows of poverty, chastity and obedience in the oratory of St John's Co-Cathedral.

Francis J. Vassallo was married to Erminia (Mimici) née Miceli Farrugia. They had three children: Alexia, Adriana and Steffan, and eight grandchildren. His wife Erminia passed in 2013.
