= Multilotto =

Gambling company based in Malta

Multilotto.
- Website type: Private
- Available in: 9 languages
- Founded: 2012; 14 years ago
- Headquarters: St. Julian's, {{{location_country}}}
- Industry: Remote betting (Lottery)
- Website: www.multilotto.com

Multilotto was a licensed gambling firm. The company was founded in 2012 and was headquartered in Malta. Multilotto is known for offering players the courier service model in 2012 but in 2015 the company changed its business model and to take bets on the outcome of a number of international and state lottery draws.

Multilotto was powered by Lotto Warehouse, which received the Malta Gaming Authority's first B2B lottery betting licence.

== Company history ==
The company primarily focused on the Nordic market and in 2017 launched in the Republic of Ireland and in the UK. Multilotto ceased operations for the foreseeable future in January 2022.

== See also ==
- One Productions
