= Michael C. Bonello =

Maltese economist

Governor of the Central Bank of Malta
- In office 1 October 1999 – 30 June 2011
- Prime Minister: Eddie Fenech Adami, Lawrence Gonzi
- Preceded by: Emanuel Ellul
- Succeeded by: Josef Bonnici

Personal details
- Education: University of Malta, University of Oxford

Michael C. Bonello is a Maltese economist, former governor of the Central Bank of Malta from 1999 to 2011.

== Biography ==
After obtaining a bachelor's degree in languages and economics from the University of Malta in 1965, Bonello pursued his studies as a Rhodes Scholar at the University of Oxford, where he took an honours degree in philosophy, politics and economics in 1969.

In 1969 he joined the Central Bank of Malta as a research assistant and later served as senior research officer from 1971 to 1978. Bonello was also president of the Malta branch of the Chartered Institute of Bankers. In 1978, he left the bank to join the private sector, where he held senior management positions and sat on the councils of the Chamber of Commerce and the Federation of Industry until he joined the United Nations Conference on Trade and Development (UNCTAD) in Geneva. Between 1983 and 1999 he served UNCTAD as senior economic affairs officer in the International Trade Division, chief of the Policy Clearance Unit, advisor in the office of the secretary-general and executive assistant to the deputy secretary-general.

He was initially appointed governor of the Central Bank of Malta on 1 October 1999 upon the proposal of Prime Minister Eddie Fenech Adami. His appointment has been extended for five years by PM Lawrence Gonzi, with effect from 1 October 2008. He left the Central Bank in 2011.

Since 2013 Bonello has been Chairman of Lombard Bank Malta plc.

Bonello is also a member of the governing and general councils of the European Central Bank, a fellow of the Institute of Financial Services and a member of the board of governors of the Malta Financial Services Authority.
