= Bank of Valletta =

Maltese bank

Bank of Valletta p.l.c.
- Type: Public limited company
- Traded as: MSE: BOV
- Industry: Banking; Financial services
- Predecessor: National Bank of Malta
- Founded: 1974
- Headquarters: BOV Centre, Cannon Road, Zone 4, Central Business District, Santa Venera, CBD4060, Malta
- Area served: Maltese Islands
- Key people: Dr Gordon Cordina (Chairman); Kenneth Farrugia (Chief Executive Officer)
- Products: Retail banking Commercial banking
- Net income: €89.20 mln (2019)
- Total assets: €15.9 billion (Q2 2025)
- Number of employees: 1,843 (2017)
- Subsidiaries: BOV Asset Management/BOV Fund Services
- Website: www.bov.com

Bank of Valletta plc (BOV) is a Maltese bank and financial services company headquartered in Santa Venera. It is the oldest established financial services provider in Malta and one of the largest. As of 2014, the bank had 44 branches, 6 regional business centres, a head office, and a wealth management arm located around the Maltese Islands. It has representative offices in the United Kingdom, Australia, Belgium and Italy.

BOV has been designated as a Significant Institution since the entry into force of European Banking Supervision in late 2014, and as a consequence is directly supervised by the European Central Bank.

== History ==
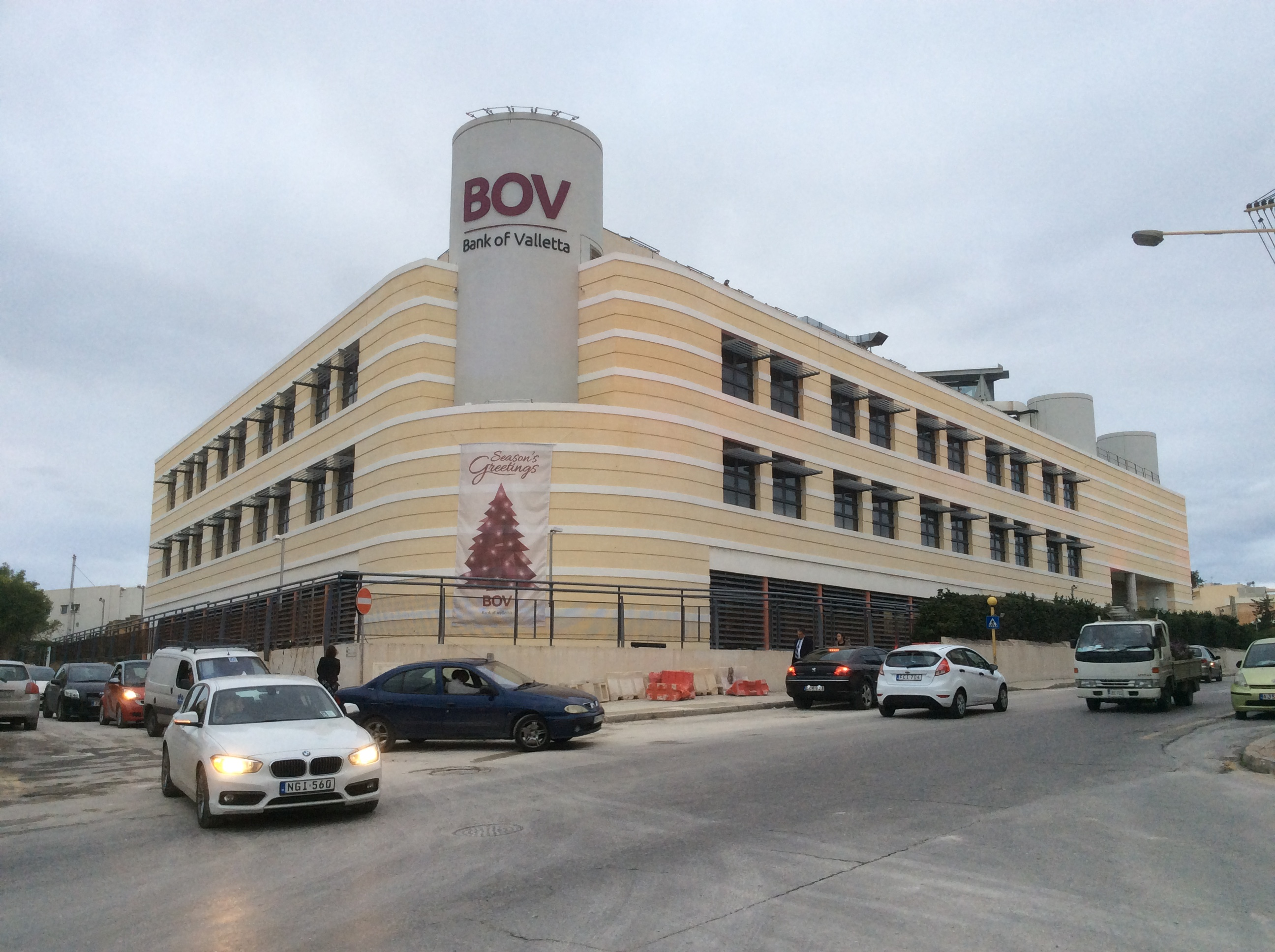
BOV headquarters in Santa Venera

With the advent of British rule in Malta, a group of English and Maltese merchants established Anglo-Maltese Bank, which commenced operations on 23 June 1809. Banco di Malta was established on 1 May 1812. Anglo-Maltese Bank and Banco di Malta began early on to issue their own promissory banknotes (payable at sight) at first in Scudi denominations and subsequently in Sterling. The third bank to be set up in Malta was B. Tagliaferro e Figli, which too was founded in 1812. The fourth bank established in Malta was Josef Scicluna et Fils, set up in 1830. These four banks would eventually merge, in stages, to form the National Bank of Malta. This was done in order to have strength in numbers at a time when there was a fear that the government was after the private banks .

Anglo-Maltese Bank and Banco di Malta merged in January 1946 under the name National Bank of Malta.

In 1949, Sciclunas Bank affiliated to the newly established bank. Twenty years after that, i.e., in 1969, National Bank of Malta merged with Tagliaferro Bank through an exchange of shares. In 1973, following a run on the National Bank of Malta and its subsidiary Tagliaferro Bank, the Maltese government after Parliament passed the 'National and Tagliaferro Banks (Temporary Provision) Act 1973'. The run on the bank is widely considered to have been orchestrated by the then government in an attempt to take control of the banking sector in Malta. On 22 March 1974 the Prime Minister Dom Mintoff announced the setting up of the Bank of Valletta. The new Bank took over the assets and liabilities of the National Bank of Malta, and commenced operations on 25 March 1974. The banking reform was described as a "hijack" by Adrain Busietta, as it created a number of controversies for those who had assets. The National Bank's liabilities were artificially inflated by 151% by the government in an attempt to make it appear as insolvent.

The Government, injected Lm3.3 million (equivalent to €7.7 million) into the new Bank in return for a 60 percent share of the capital. The Malta Development Corporation took up the remaining 40 percent, and in time sold 20 percent to the Banco di Sicilia and 10 percent to the Maltese public. In 1986, the Bank inaugurated its first overseas representative office.

In 1990, the Maltese government reduced its stake in Bank to 51 percent by issuing and offering 4.9 million shares to the public. That same year Bank of Valletta launched its fully owned investment bank - the subsidiary Valletta Investment Bank.

In 1992, Bank of Valletta International started operating. This wholly owned international banking subsidiary of the Bank of Valletta Group was Malta's first Offshore Bank. That same year Bank of Valletta became the first bank to be listed on the Malta Stock Exchange.

In 1995, Bank of Valletta and Insight Investment Management Limited established the Valletta Fund Management.

In September 2000, BOV set up its stockbroking arm, BOV Stockbrokers Limited ("BOVSL"). In time, Bank of Valletta amalgamated Bank of Valletta International Limited, Valletta Investment Bank Limited, Card Services Limited, and BOVSL.

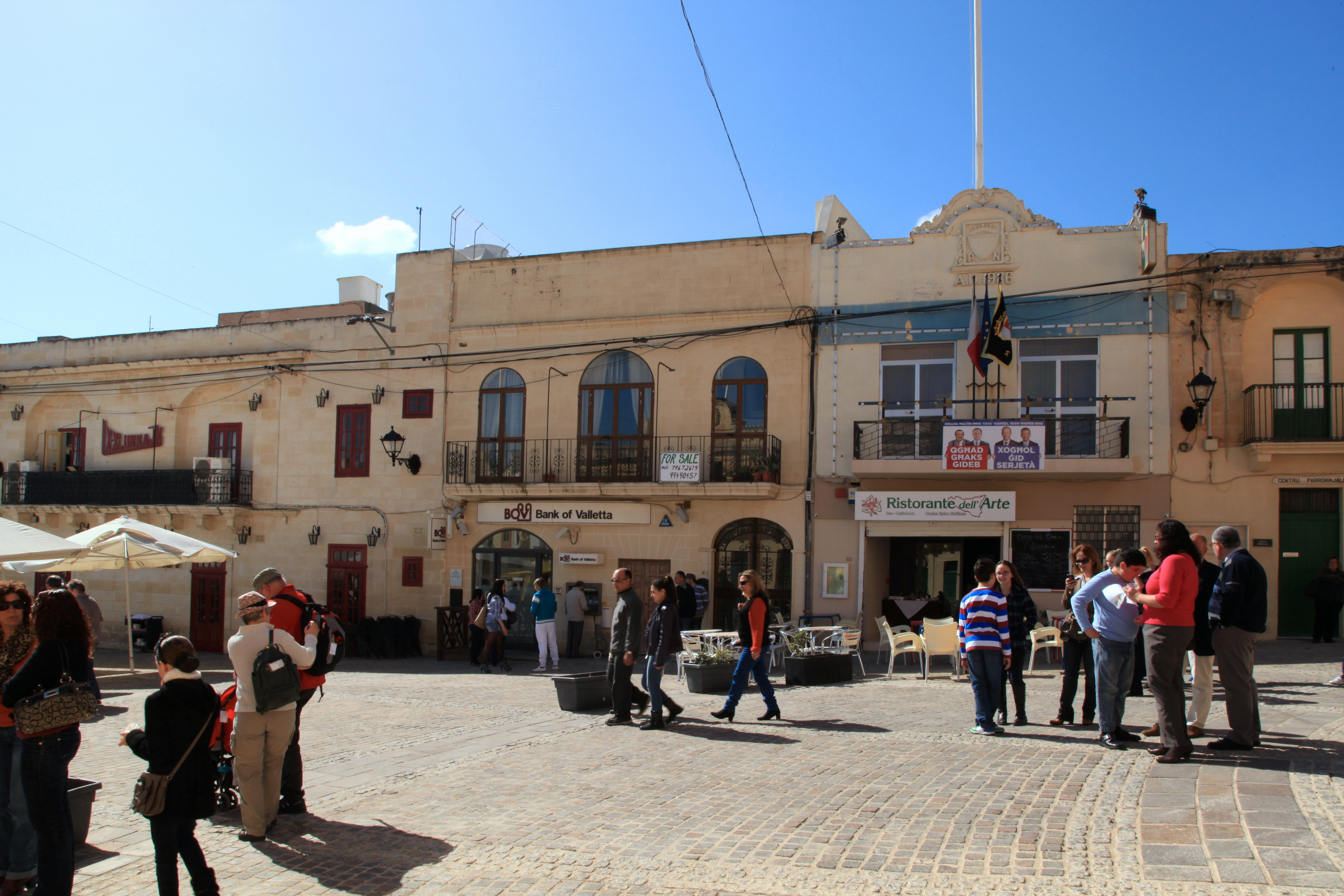
Bank of Valletta branch in Marsaxlokk

Bank of Valletta continued to evolve its internationalisation through the opening of other representative offices in the Euro-Mediterranean region, though it closed the representative offices in Cairo and Tunis in 2011. With Malta's accession into the European Union, Bank of Valletta has become an active member of the European Savings Banks Group.

On 9 January 2014, a Maltese court found that the shareholders of the National Bank of Malta had suffered human rights abuses when the government of Malta had in 1975 forced them to sign away their shares for zero compensation. On 6 February 2014, a Maltese court again found that shareholders of the National Bank of Malta had their rights violated when their assets were taken by the Government of Malta. The government of Malta appealed these decisions, both the Constitutional Court of Malta has now confirmed the judgements of the previous courts. Shareholders will be able to negotiate a compensation package that is likely to involve Bank of Valletta shares.

== Shareholding ==
In 1992, the Bank became the first public company to be listed on the Malta Stock Exchange. As of November 2025, 25% of the Bank's equity is held by the Government of Malta, UniCredit S.p.A. holds a 5.21% stake, Hili Ventures holds a 4.99% stake, and the remaining 64.80% is in the hands of the general public.

== Bank of Valletta today ==
The Group offers financial services both for personal and non-personal customers, including Retail Banking, Wealth Management and Investment Services, Capital Market Services, Fund Administration, Bancassurance and Card Services.

Bank of Valletta p.l.c. operates the largest retail network on the island, with thirty six branches, one satellite branch and four agencies around Malta and Gozo. Furthermore, the Bank has Investment Centres and Business Centres offering specialised services. Finally, the BOV Premium Banking Centre hosts the Wealth Management arm and Corporate Centre.

== Bank of Valletta Group ==
Bank of Valletta p.l.c. is the parent company of the Group, which comprises:

Fully Owned Subsidiaries

- BOV Asset Management Limited
- BOV Fund Services Limited

Associated Companies

- MAPFRE Middlesea p.l.c.
- MAPFRE MSV Life p.l.c.

== BOV Adventure Park ==
BOV not only has a headquarters building but has a park named BOV Adventure Park that is located in Ta' Qali, close to the football stadium. It revamped in 2021.

== See also ==
- List of banks in the euro area
- List of banks in Malta
