= FIMBank =

Financial institution registered in Malta

FIMBank is the fifth largest Bank in Malta and a public limited company founded in 1994. It is listed on the Malta Stock Exchange (MSE: FIM). FIMBank is a part of KIPCO Group.

== History ==
FIMBank Group was founded in 1994. The group established First International Merchant Bank Ltd, which began operations in 1995. In 2001, its shares were listed on the Malta Stock Exchange.

In 2003, the group acquired full control of London Forfaiting Company Ltd.

In 2005, First International Merchant Bank Ltd. changed its name to FIMBank p.l.c.

In 2011, FIMBank Group opened its headquarters in St Julian's.

In 2012, FIMBank developed an online savings platform Easisave.

In 2013, United Gulf Bank, the commercial banking division of KIPCO and Burgan Bank acquired 80 percent of FIMBank shares, and in 2018, all FIMBank shares previously owned by United Gulf Bank were transferred to United Gulf Holding Company.

FIMBank launched the digital banking platform FIMBank Direct in 2017.

In October 2022, Fitch Ratings revised FIMBank's outlook to Stable having affirmed it 'B'.

== See also ==
- List of banks in the euro area
- List of banks in Malta
