= List of hotels in Malta =

This is an incomplete list of hotels in Malta.

Hotel	Image	Hotel rating	Location	Description
Malta Marriott Hotel & Spa		*****	St. Julian's	
Hotel Phoenicia		*****	Floriana	
The Westin Dragonara		*****	St. Julian's	
Palazzo Capua			Sliema	
Grand Hotel Excelsior		*****	Floriana	
Comino Hotel			Comino	
Ramla Bay Resort			Mellieħa	
Coastline Hotel			Naxxar	
Kempinski San Lawrenz		*****	San Lawrenz	
Hotel Fortina		*****	Sliema	
Preluna Towers		****	Sliema	
Hilton Malta		*****	St. Julian’s	

- Note: not full a list

== Former hotels ==
- Grand Hotel, Valletta
- Jerma Palace Hotel, Marsaskala (closed 2007)
- Marfa Palace Hotel, Mellieħa
- Selmun Palace Hotel, Mellieħa (closed 2011)

== See also ==
- Lists of hotels – an index of hotel list articles on Wikipedia
