= .mt =

Internet country top-level domain for Malta

- Introduced: 2 December 1992
- TLD type: Country code top-level domain
- Status: Active
- Registry: NIC Malta
- Sponsor: NIC Malta
- Intended use: Entities connected with Malta
- Actual use: Popular in Malta
- Registration restrictions: Must declare right to use name as trademark or business name in accordance with Maltese law
- Structure: Registrations are taken at the third level beneath various second level names
- Documents: Terms and conditions
- Dispute policies: Disputes are expected to be resolved between the disputing policies using any of the ordinary remedies afforded by law
- Registry website: NIC-MT

.mt is the Internet country code top-level domain (ccTLD) for Malta.

== Second-level domains ==
Since 1 December 2017, it is possible to register .mt domains directly at the second level, such as myname.mt. Registration is possible at the third level under a number of second level domain names.

- edu.mt: used by educational institutions, e.g. the University of Malta
- gov.mt: Malta government official portal
- com.mt: commercial entities e.g. The Times of Malta
- org.mt: non-profit entities e.g. Din l-Art Ħelwa
