= Malta Marriott Hotel & Spa =

Hotel in St. Julian's, Malta

Coordinates: 35°54′52″N 14°29′35″E

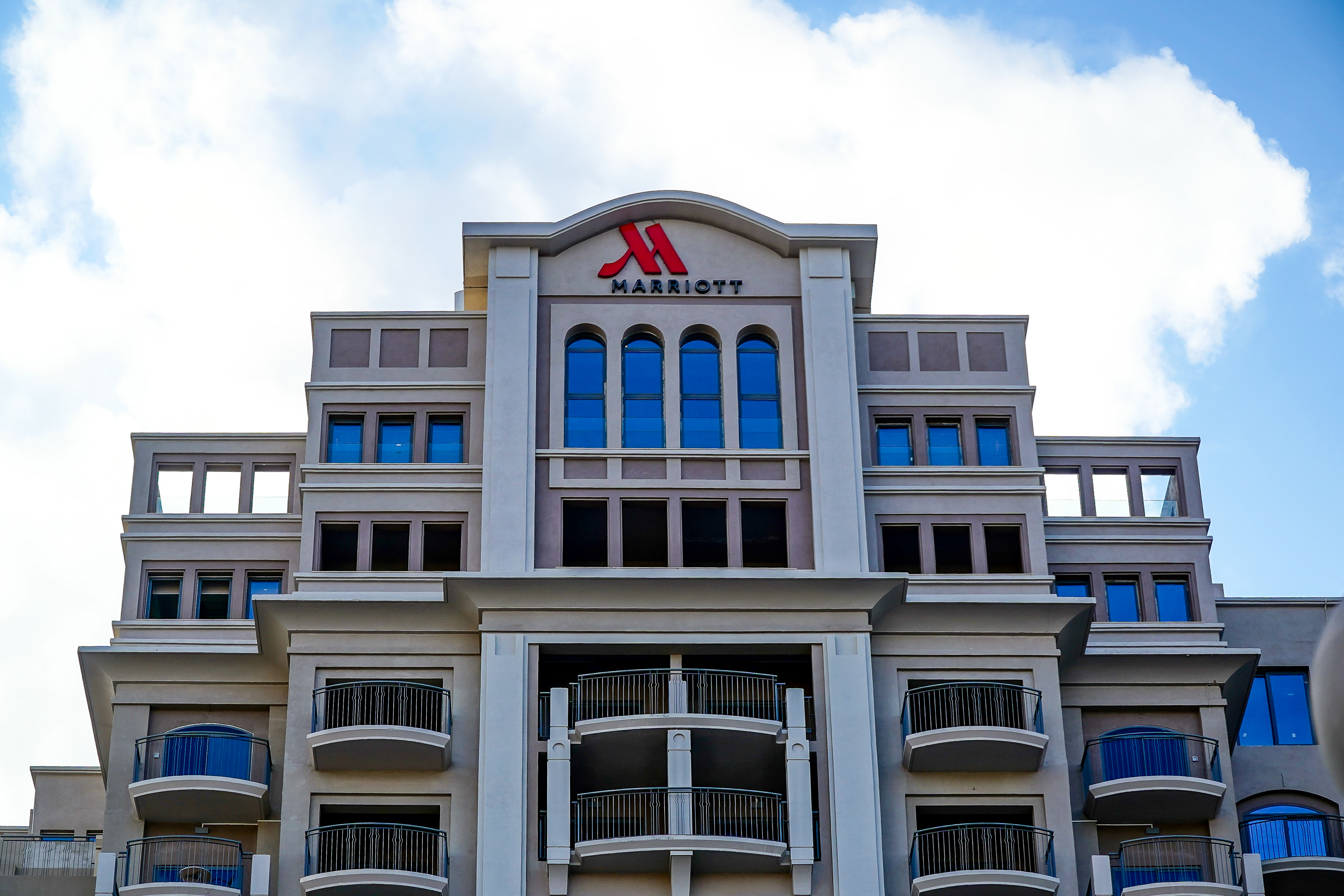
Malta Marriott Hotel & Spa

Malta Marriott Hotel & Spa, formerly Le Méridien St. Julian's, is a 5-star hotel located on the Maltese Islands. The hotel was built on the grounds of a 19th-century Villa. The premises of the hotel are situated across the promenade of Balluta Bay in St. Julian's.

Malta Marriott Hotel & Spa is part of Marriott International and offers 5-star accommodation with 301 contemporary guestrooms.

Its available restaurants and bars are:

- Marketplace (Buffet Restaurant)
- Atrio Lobby Bar & Restaurant
- M Club Lounge (subscriber)
- The Sundeck (Seasonal)

Malta Marriott Hotel & Spa works in collaboration with Myoka Spa, whose management is handling the Spa Facilities of the hotel.

The spa facilities of the hotel include:

- Heated tropical indoor pool
- Jacuzzi
- Sauna & Hammam
- Treatment rooms
- Relaxation area
- Fitness center

Malta Marriott Hotel & Spa has a rooftop outdoor pool (The Sundeck) and a floor dedicated to conference facilities with 13 meeting rooms. The hotel is open all year round.
