= Central Bank of Malta =

Monetary authority for Malta

Central Bank of Malta Bank Ċentrali ta’ Malta

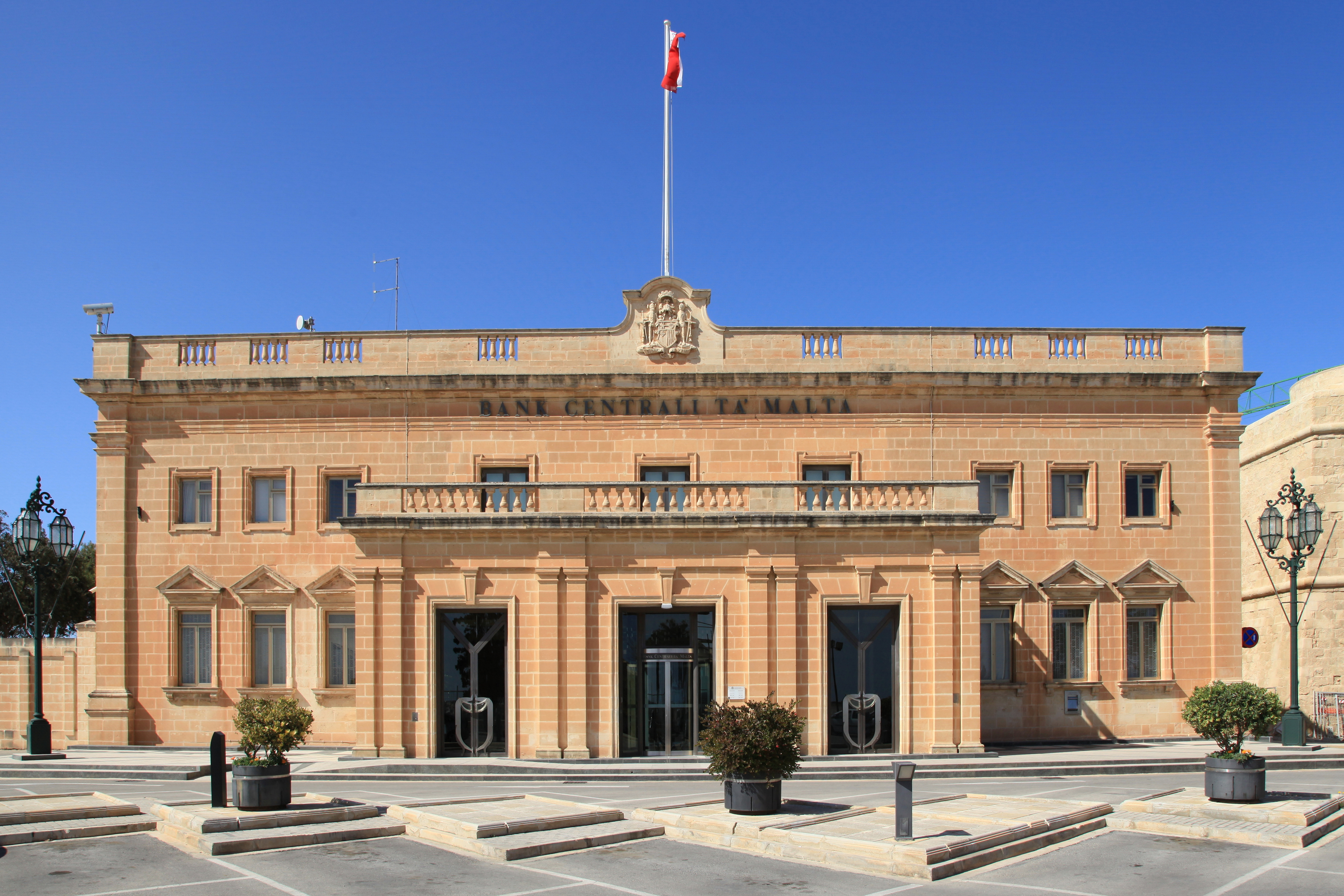
- Central bank of: Malta
- Headquarters: Binja Laparelli, St James’s Counterguard, Valletta
- Coordinates: 35.8955568°N 14.509722°E
- Established: 17 April 1968; 58 years ago
- Ownership: 100% state ownership
- Governor: Alexander Demarco
- Reserves: 400 million USD
- Website: www.centralbankmalta.org
- The Central Bank of Malta still exists, but many functions have been taken over by the ECB.

The Central Bank of Malta (Maltese: Bank Ċentrali ta’ Malta) is the national central bank for Malta within the Eurosystem. It was the Maltese central bank from 1968 to 2007, issuing the Maltese lira.

The Central Bank of Malta Act was originally published by means of Act XXXI of 1967, succeeded the Board of Commissioners of Currency of Malta which had been in operation since 1940. It has been amended a number of times, most recently by Acts I and IV of 2007 in order to provide for the bank's membership within the Eurosystem.

The Central Bank of Malta is not itself a financial supervisory authority but participates in European banking supervision as a member of the Supervisory Board of the European Central Bank, alongside the Malta Financial Services Authority. It is also a member of the European Systemic Risk Board (ESRB).

== Building ==
The Central Bank of Malta is located in an early 20th-century building. Completed in 1924 as the Vernon Institute, or Vernon Club. The bank occupied the building since 1967, but made arrangement for the lease of the premises in 1968, with a contract lasting almost hundred years. The interior was eventually demolished in 1968, keeping the façade, to be redeveloped and housing the present Central Bank of Malta. In 2004, the building was bought from the Government of Malta by the bank.

== Governors ==
Governors of the Central Bank of Malta since 1968.

- Philip L. Hogg: 17 April 1968 – 31 March 1972
- Borge Andersen: 1 April 1972 – 16 March 1973
- R.J.A. Earland: 17 March 1973 – 25 January 1974
- Henry C. de Gabriele: 1 September 1985 – 6 November 1986 (acting)
- Anthony P. Galdes: 3 June 1987 – 2 June 1993
- Francis J. Vassallo: 15 September 1993 – 30 September 1997
- Emanuel Ellul: 1 October 1997 – 30 September 1999
- Michael C. Bonello: 1 October 1999 – 30 June 2011
- Josef Bonnici: 1 July 2011 – 30 June 2016
- Mario Vella: 1 July 2016 – 31 December 2020
- Edward Scicluna: 1 January 2021 – 31 December 2025
- Alexander Demarco: 1 January 2026 – Incumbent

== See also ==
- Economy of Malta
- Maltese lira
- List of central banks
