= Malta Stock Exchange =

Stock exchange in Malta

- Borża ta' Malta
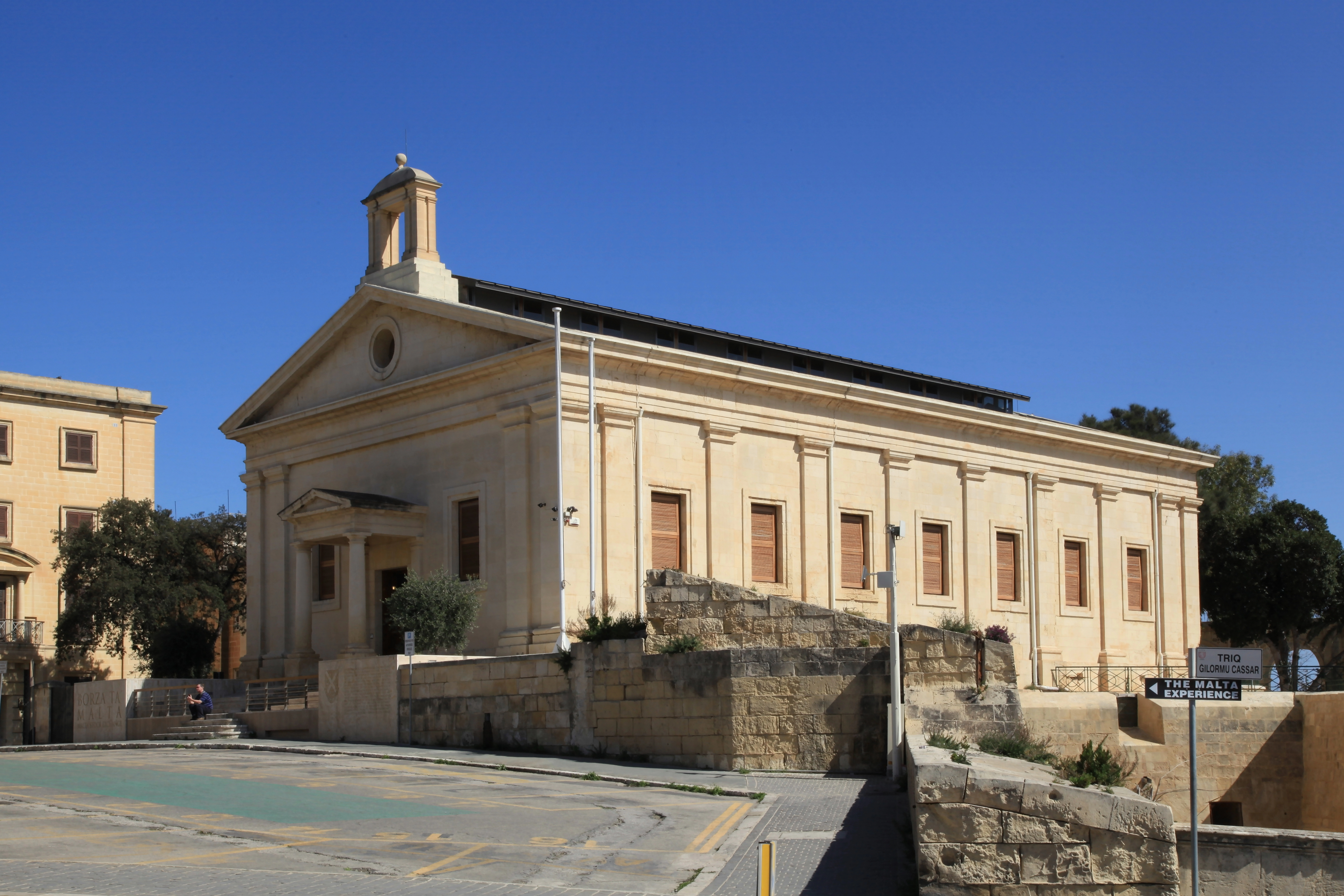
- Type: Stock exchange
- Location: Valletta, Malta
- Coordinates: 35°53′42″N 14°30′42″E
- Founded: January 8, 1992
- Key people: Chairman - Joseph Portelli, CEO - Simon Zammit
- Currency: EUR, GBP, US$
- No. of listings: 320 (Regulated Main Market, 31 December 2025)
- Market cap: €18.6 billion (Regulated Main Market, 31 December 2025)
- Volume: €392.66 million (Regulated Main Market, 2025)
- Website: www.borzamalta.com.mt

The Malta Stock Exchange (Maltese: Borża ta' Malta) is the stock exchange of the island nation of Malta. Established in 1992, it is fully owned by the Maltese government.

The Malta Stock Exchange has been key to the raising of capital for the private sector through the issue of corporate bonds and equity while virtually all the national debt of Government of Malta has been issued in the form of Malta Government bonds and treasury bills that are listed and traded on the secondary market. The investor base consists of over 75,000 individual investors, which is a significant number given Malta's economic size (GDP €8,796 million in 2015) and population (434,403 in 2016). The focus of the Malta Stock Exchange is to continue to develop and support the domestic market whilst attracting international companies to list on the Exchange, and enjoy the passportability within the EU that this brings. It has also invested heavily in the use of technology and uses the Xetra trading platform.

== History ==
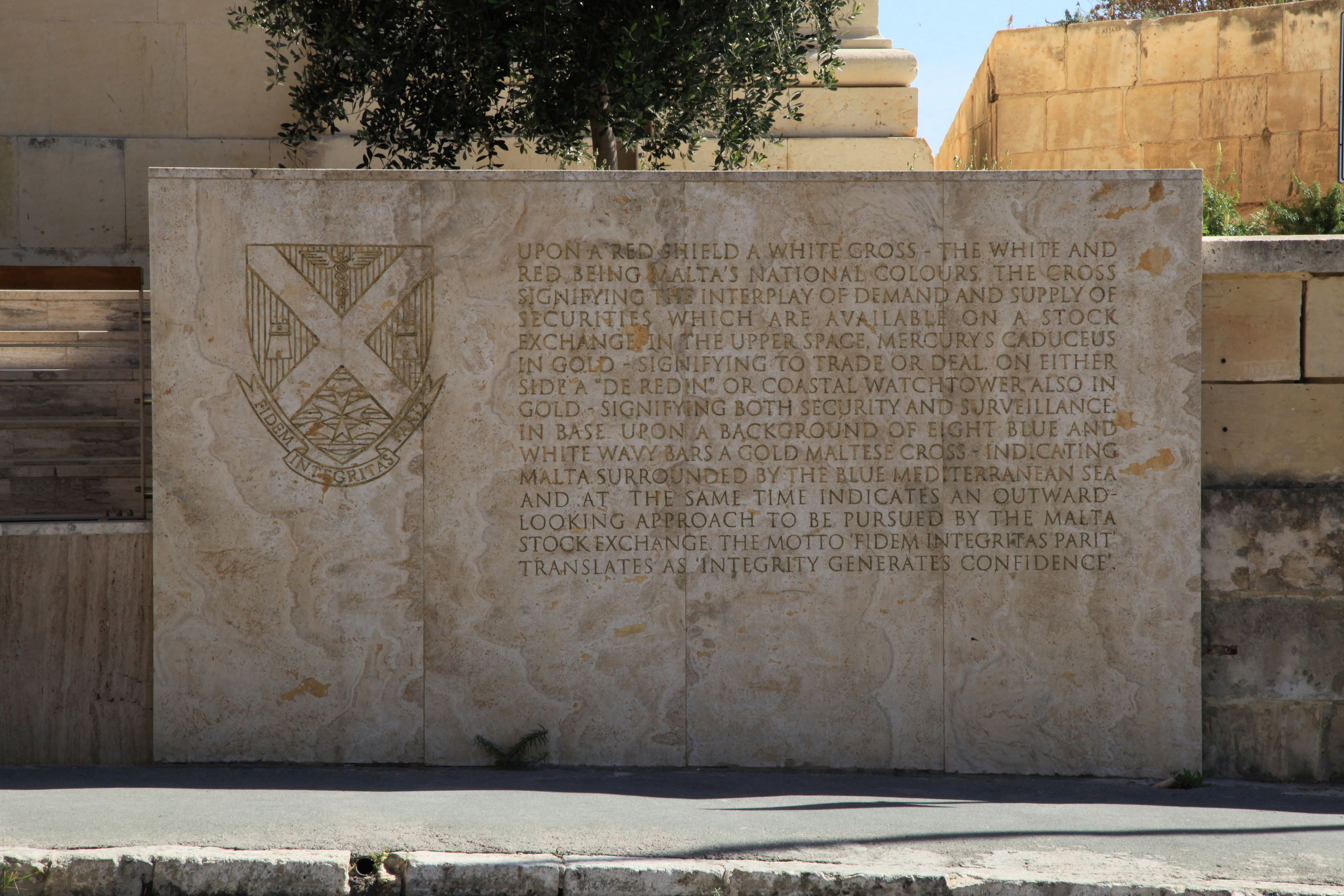
Emblem of the Malta Stock Exchange

The Exchange was established with the enactment of the Malta Stock Exchange Act in 1990, and commenced trading operations on 8 January 1992. The Central Bank of Malta was originally appointed as the supervisor of the Exchange, a role now assumed by the Malta Financial Services Authority (MFSA).

In 1999, the Exchange moved into the former Garrison Chapel building in Castille Square, Valletta. This iconic building was built in 1857 on the designs of T. M. Ellis, and was used as a multi-denominational place of worship until 1950. The former church was then used for entertainment purposes, as a post office and as a naval school, before it was taken over and extensively renovated by the Exchange. It has been known since then as the Exchange Building or The Borsa. The Exchange is located close to the Office of the Prime Minister at Auberge de Castille and the Upper Barrakka Gardens.

In 2013, the Exchange achieved Designated Offshore Securities Market status by the U.S. Securities and Exchange Commission complementing the HM Revenue and Customs recognition that had been obtained from the UK authorities in 2005.

On 23 August 2023, the company formed EuroCTP as a joint venture with 13 other bourses, in an effort to provide a consolidated tape for the European Union, as part of the Capital Markets Union proposed by the European Commission.

== Services ==
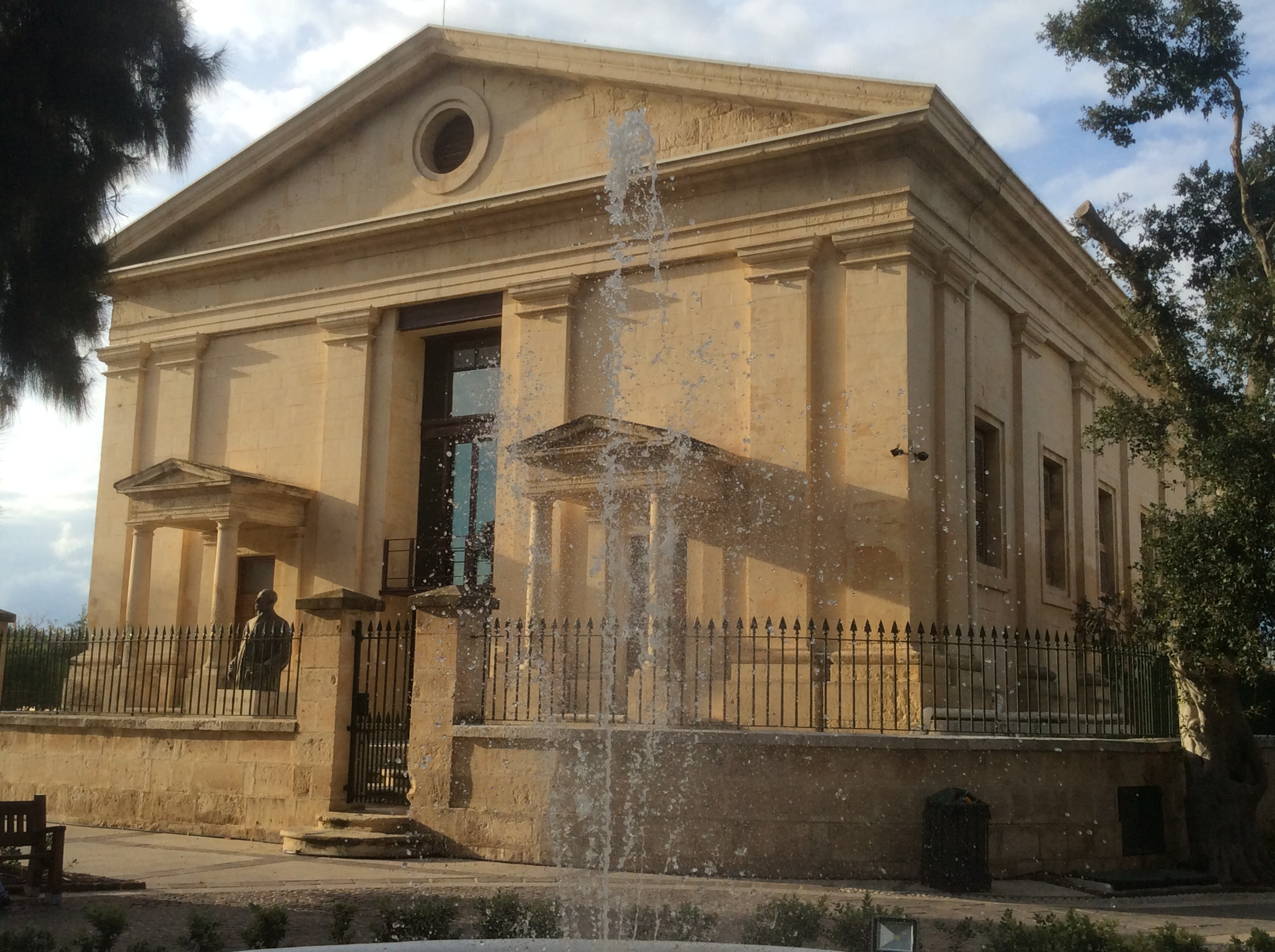
Garrison Church, now Stock Exchange, as seen from the back

The Malta Stock Exchange offers the following services:

- Admittance to listing on the MSE Main list or Alternative Companies List, subject to approval by the Maltese Regulator, the MFSA. Listed instruments have full passporting rights within the EU. Listed companies can their instruments traded on their own national exchange, within the EU, or on the Malta Stock Exchange.
- Secondary market trading: The Secondary market is mostly domestic, with 14 Maltese Members and 1 International Member trading on the Exchange's Xetra platform. This platform is operated remotely from the Deutsche Börse, in Frankfurt, and allows connectivity to the MSE by any of the 4,500+ traders who also connect to the Xetra platform around the world.
- Central Securities Depository services (CSD): The Depository services are mainly shareholder and bondholder register administration, for public as well as private companies, clearing and settlement processing relating to the trading platform, and custodial services. The CSD also offers registrar services in respect of IPOs.
- Prospects, an SME-oriented capital market: This market, which is a multilateral trading facility (MTF) regulated by the MSE, allows SMEs in Malta and overseas to raise capital through equity or bond issues in a cost-effective and timely manner under a lighter regulatory framework. It primarily targets issues of under €5 million.
- Institutional Financial Securities Market (IFSM), the first Maltese wholesale securities market authorised in terms of the Wholesale Markets' listing rules issued by the Listing Authority. The IFSM admits asset backed securities, debt securities, insurance linked notes, convertible debt securities and derivative securities. The fee structure is very cost effective and the IFSM offers increased flexibility to meet the needs of issuers and institutional investors.

The Malta Stock Exchange is Malta's national numbering agency, issuing ISINs in respect of all securities issued in Malta.

== Membership ==
The MSE is a member of:

- World Federation of Exchanges (WFE)
- Federation of European Securities Exchanges (FESE)
- European Central Securities Depositories Association (ECSDA)
- International Organization of Securities Commissions (IOSCO)
- Association of National Numbering Agencies (ANNA)

== See also ==
- List of companies listed on the Malta Stock Exchange
