= Barrakka Lift =

Elevator in Valletta, Malta

Coordinates: 35°53′39.74″N 14°30′43.21″E

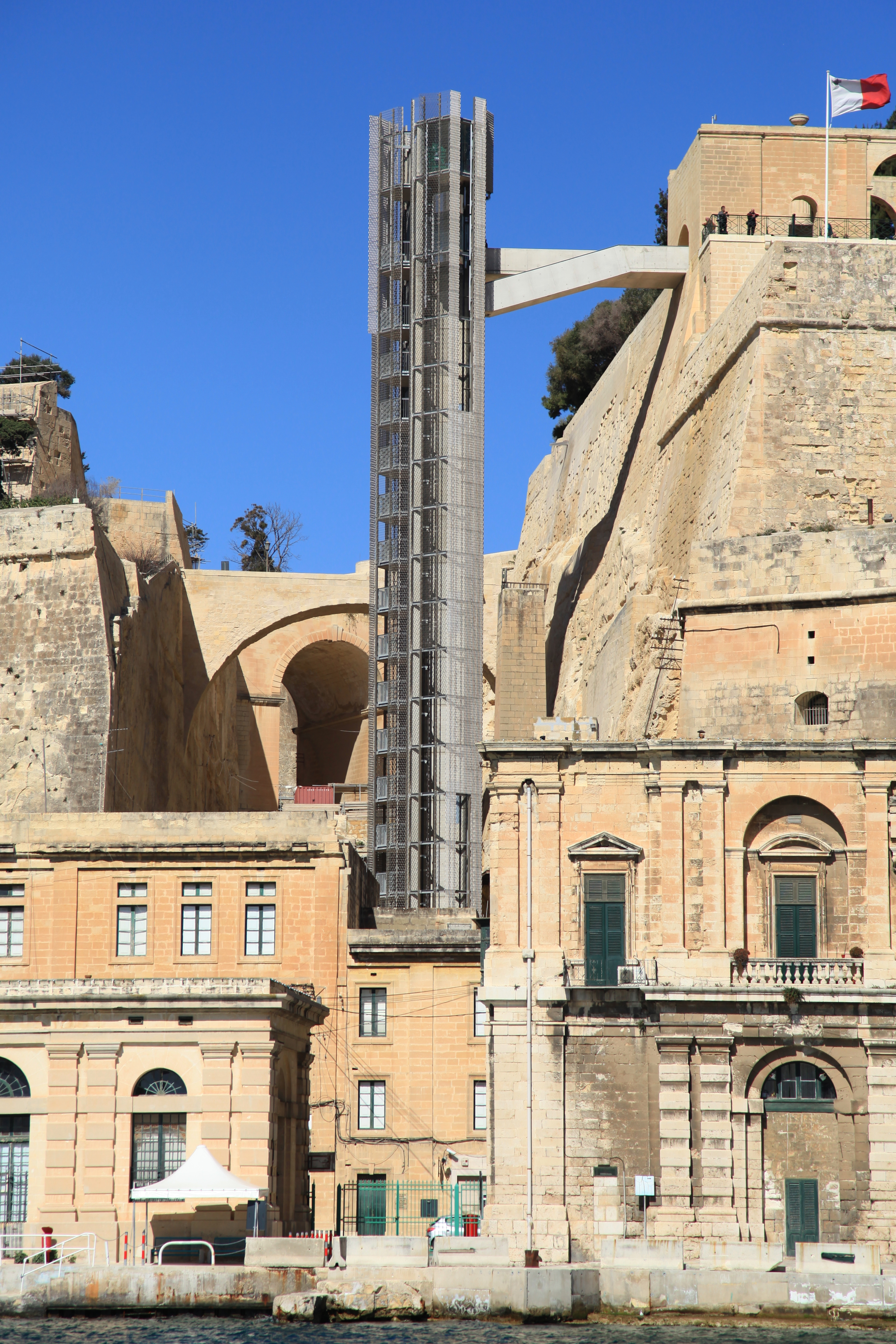
The Barrakka Lift as viewed from the Grand Harbour

The Barrakka Lift is a lift in Valletta, Malta which was constructed in 2012, on the site of a previous lift which had operated from 1905 to 1973 and which was demolished in 1983. It is located inside the ditch of the fortifications of Valletta, and links Lascaris Wharf to St. Peter and Paul Bastion and the Upper Barrakka Gardens. It therefore allows access from the Grand Harbour to the city.

== First lift ==
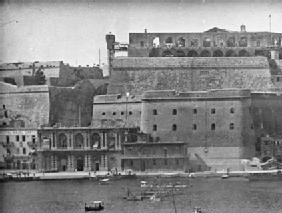
The original Barrakka Lift, c. 1915

=== Background and construction ===
In 1901, Sacco Albanese, a former employee of the Edison Manufacturing Company, proposed the construction of a tramway in Malta. The tender was won by Macartney, McElroy & Co. Ltd, which apart from the tramway also planned to construct two lifts in Valletta, one near Marsamxett Harbour and another near the Grand Harbour. Eventually it was decided to only construct the lift on the Grand Harbour side, and the contract was signed on 24 December 1903.

Macartney, McElroy & Co. Ltd hired the London-based subcontractors Joseph Richmond & Co. Ltd. The construction costing £5,000 (Note: Comparing early 20th century costs and prices with those of the modern period is challenging. £5000 in 1905 could be equivalent to between £500,000 and £5.2 million in 2017, depending on the price comparison used.) was completed in September 1905. The official opening took place on 18 December 1905.

=== Description ===
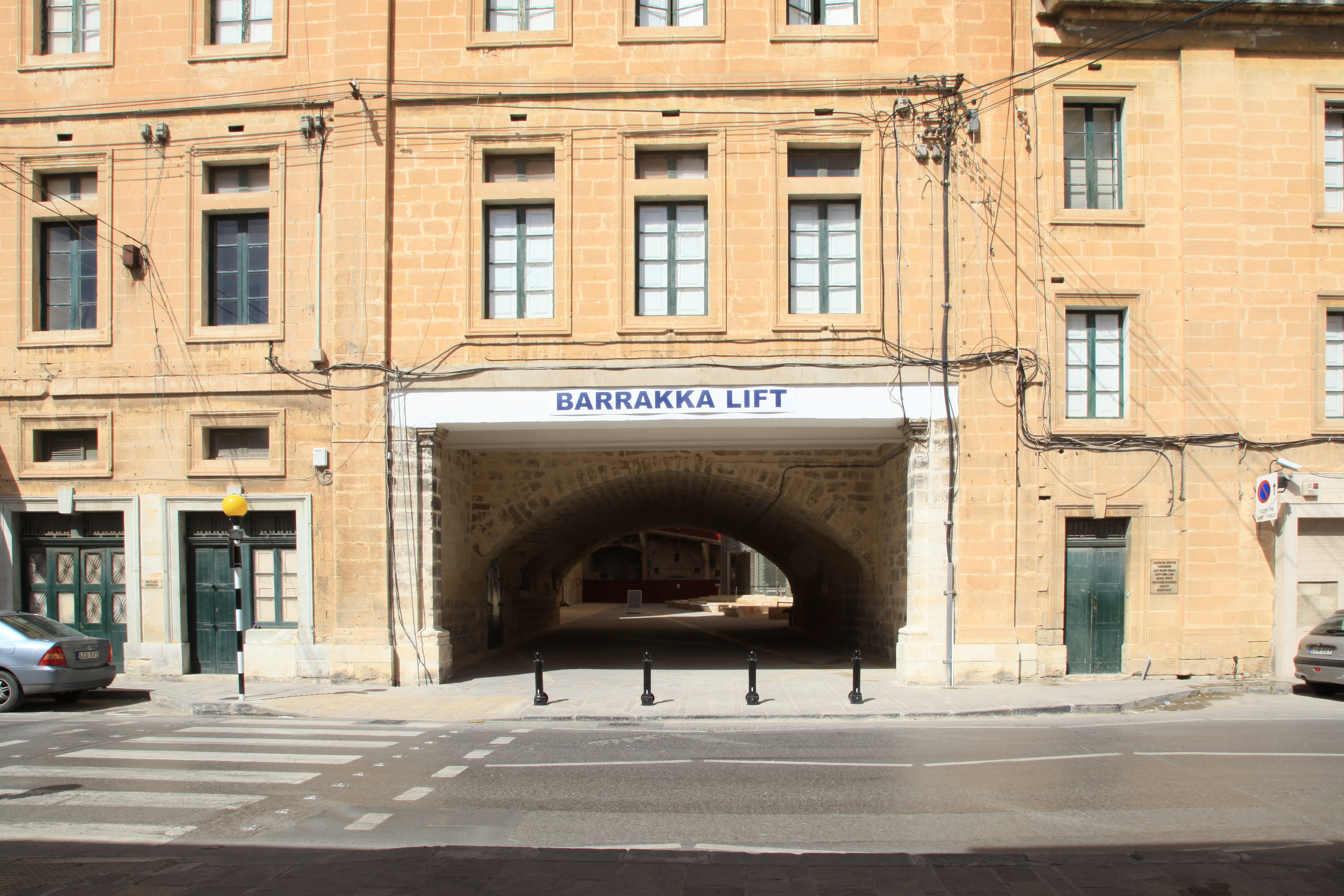
Tunnel leading to the lift

The lift was constructed out of steel, and it was 60 m (200 ft) high while it had a weight of 75 tonnes (74 long tons; 83 short tons). Part of the sloping bastion wall was cut out so as to make way for the lift's tower, while steel girders were attached to the top of the lift to ensure stability.

The lift had two cabins that could hold 12 passengers and were suspended on four ropes. Two 500 V motors were located in the booth at the top of the tower, allowing a maximum speed of 1.3 m/s. Hydraulic buffers designed to brake the elevator were located at the bottom of the lift shafts.

=== Operation ===
Tickets for the lift initially cost ½d for military personnel and 1d for other clients. Daily profits were around £10 on weekdays and £14 on Sundays.

In World War I, problems arose regarding the supply of spare parts and coal which was used to power the lift. In October 1917, the company was forced to suspend the lift due to a lack of spare parts, and operation resumed only in June 1919 after the war had ended.

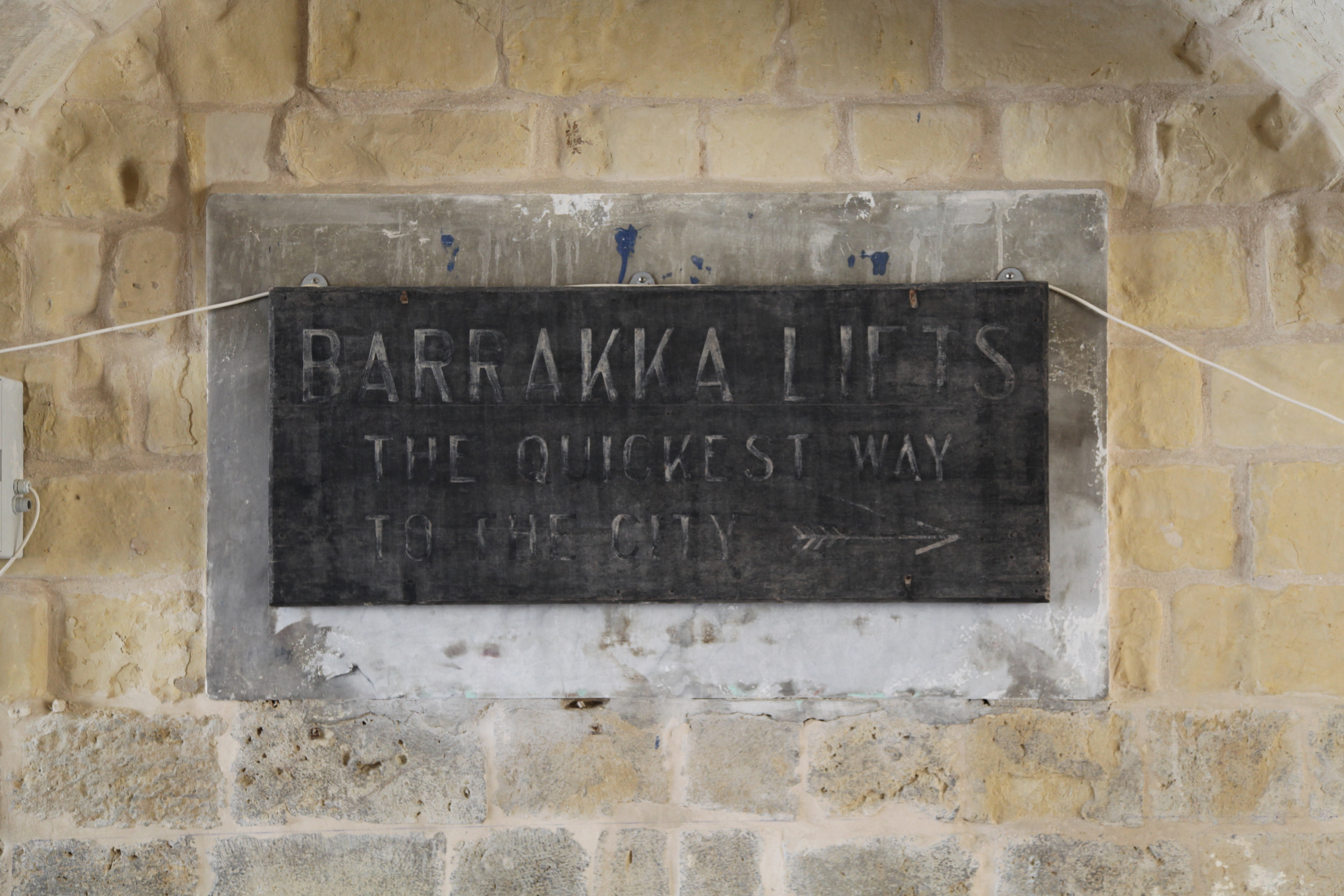
A sign from the original lift, found within the tunnel leading to it

The Malta Tramways were abolished in 1929, and the power plant which supplied the lift stopped functioning in 1931, when the government granted the company a plot near the elevator so as to allow them to build a new power station on it. This allowed the lift to be powered by electricity from the power grid, and the new building also had a waiting room.

A significant drop in customers using the lift occurred during World War II, due to increasing ticket prices caused by increased electricity costs and irregular ferry services. Initially it was planned to increase prices by ½d, but prices were eventually increased by 1d in 1941, resulting in tickets for military employees costing 1½d and those for other clients costing 2d. In February 1941, 18,224 people were transported, resulting in a profit of £128.19s.8d. In February 1942, over 650 passengers were transported on an average daily basis.

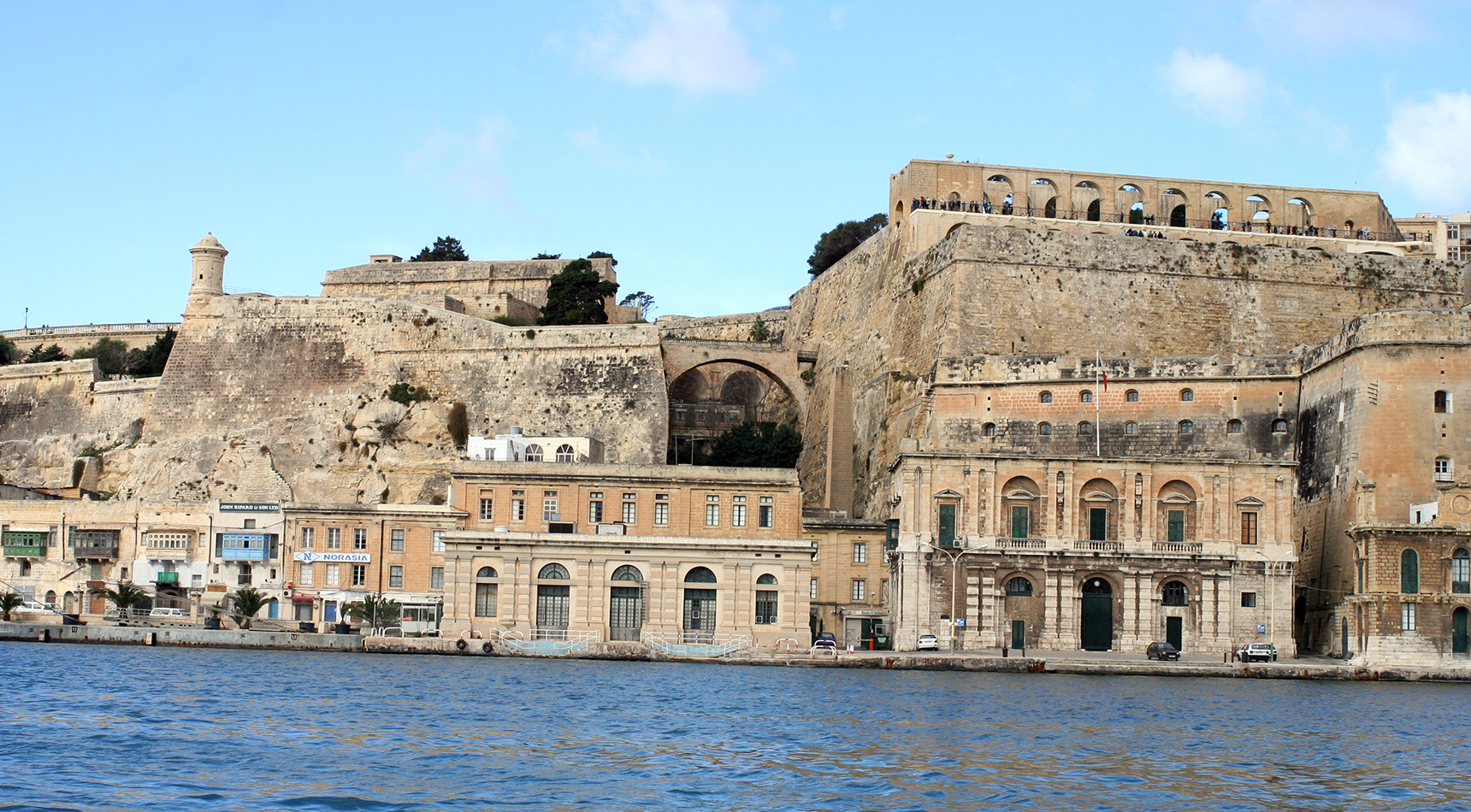
View of the area in 2007, after the demolition of the first lift and before the construction of the second one

Political changes in the decades after the war, including Malta's independence in 1964, took their toll on the bridge. A significant number of the lift's clients were British military personnel and employees, and the reduced military activity after independence resulted in a further drop in the number of customers. Ticket prices rose by another ½d in 1958. A planned increase of fees up to 3d in 1964 was not accepted by the government.

The company reported significant losses on 22 January 1973, and the lift ceased operation on 1 February 1973. It was passed to the government in 1974, and Macartney, McElroy & Co. Ltd was liquidated in 1975. Proposals to restart operation of the lift were never implemented, and in the late 1970s the decision to dismantle the lift was made. Initially this did not take place due to the significant costs involved, but the lift was eventually demolished between June and August 1983. Demolition was carried out by the General Construction and Engineering Company, which had been set up by the government specifically for dismantling the lift. It was planned to use the salvaged steel to rebuild the St Elmo Bridge which had been destroyed in World War II, but this was never done and the steel was abandoned at Corradino.

== Second lift ==
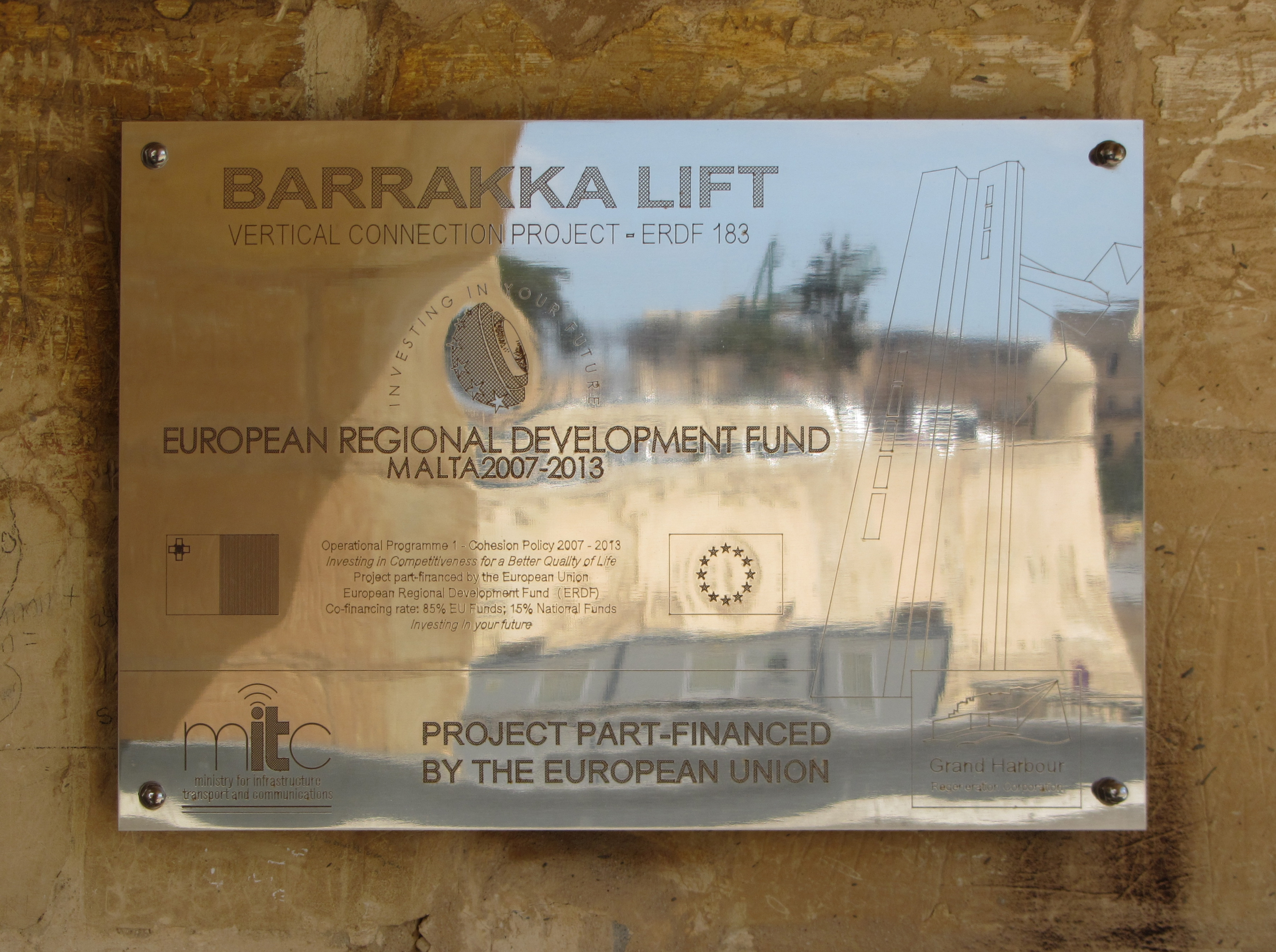
Sign at the Barrakka Lift

=== Construction ===
Plans to construct a new lift at the site were initiated in 2004, with the intention being to facilitate access to the historic centre of Valletta from the Grand Harbour, where cruise liners were being berthed. A ferry service linking the Three Cities to the harbour was also planned. In 2009 it was decided that the lift was to be rebuilt by the Grand Harbour Regeneration Corporation at an estimated cost of €2 million. The estimated date of completion was originally March 2011, but delays related to obtaining the required permits led to work on the project beginning in July 2011. The construction of the lift was partially financed by the European Regional Development Fund.

The lift wad designed by the local firm Architecture Project. It was inaugurated on 15 December 2012 by Prime Minister Lawrence Gonzi and infrastructure minister Austin Gatt. The ferry service linking the Three Cities to the Grand Harbour was inaugurated a week before the lift.

=== Description ===
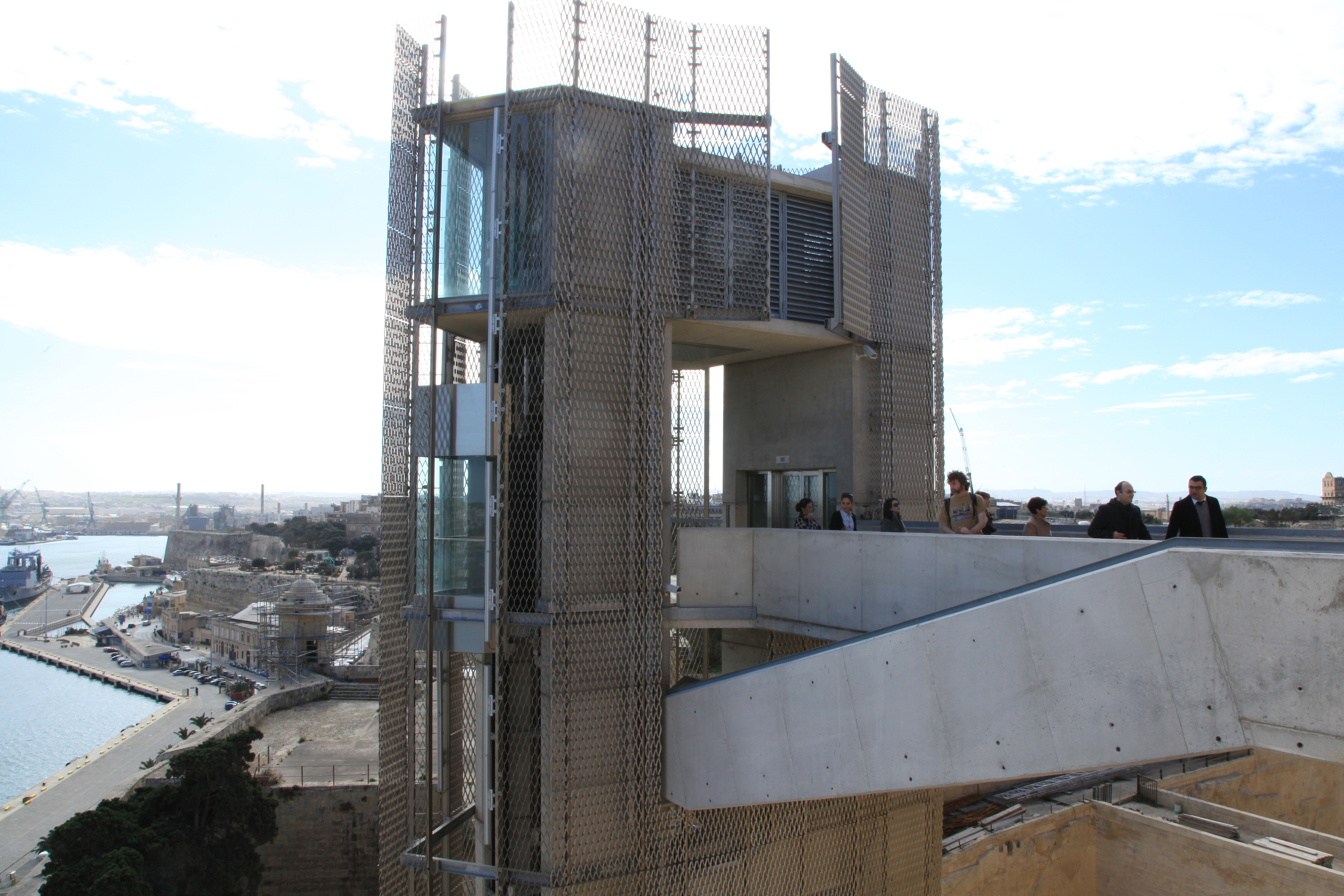
The Barrakka Lift as seen from the Upper Barrakka Gardens

The lift stands at 58 m (190 ft), and it consists of a concrete structure which is surrounded by an aluminium mesh. It has two cabins which can carry up to 21 passengers each, resulting in a carrying capacity of up to 800 people per hour. The journey takes approximately 23 seconds. It also includes a flight of stairs.

=== Operation ===
The lift always opens at 0630 and closes from

01 Oct to 31 October at midnight.

01 Nov to 30 Apr Mon to Thu & Sun: 2200 hrs Fri & Sat: 2330hrs

01 May to 31 May Mon to Thu & Sun: 2330hrs hrs Fri & Sat: 0030 hrs

A return trip costs €1, and it is free for those customers with personalized tal-Linja Card.
