= St Elmo Bridge =

Single-span arched truss steel footbridge in Malta

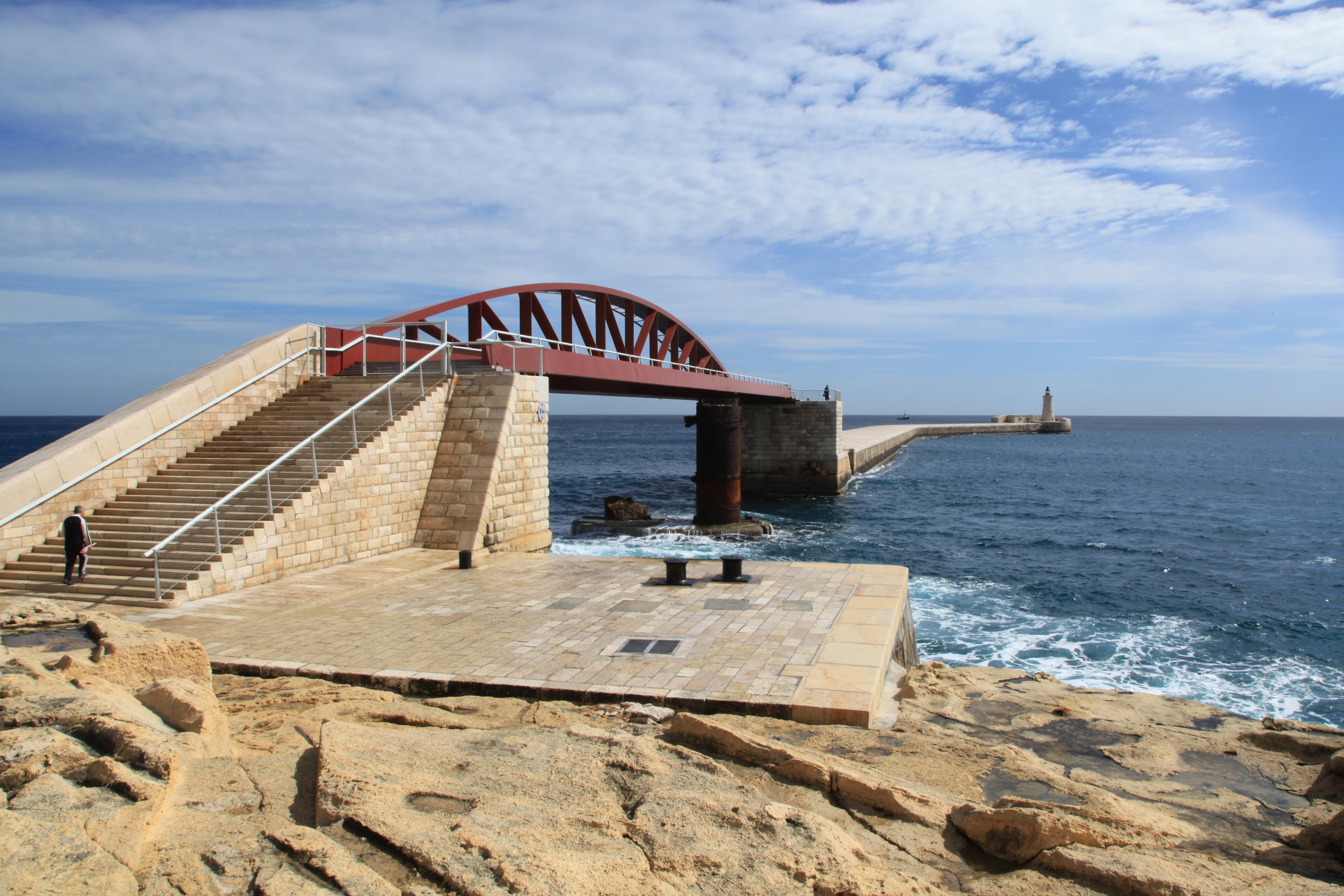
- The bridge and the breakwater
- Coordinates: 35°54′10.29″N 14°31′15.64″E
- Named for: Fort Saint Elmo

Characteristics
- Design: Arched truss footbridge
- Material: Steel
- Total length: 70 m (230 ft)
- Width: 5.5 m (18 ft)
- No. of spans: 1
- Clearance below: 9 m (30 ft) from mean high water level
- Design life: 120 years

History
- Architect: Arenas & Asociados
- Construction end: 5 October 2011
- Construction cost: €2.8 million
- Inaugurated: 24 July 2012

Location
- Interactive map of St Elmo Bridge

The St Elmo Bridge is a single-span arched truss steel footbridge leading from the foreshore of Fort Saint Elmo in Valletta, Malta, to the breakwater at the entrance of the Grand Harbour. It was constructed in 2011–12 to designs of the Spanish architects Arenas & Asociados. The bridge stands on the site of an earlier bridge which had been built in 1906 and destroyed during World War II in 1941. The original bridge had a design similar to the present one, but it had two spans instead of one.

== Original bridge ==
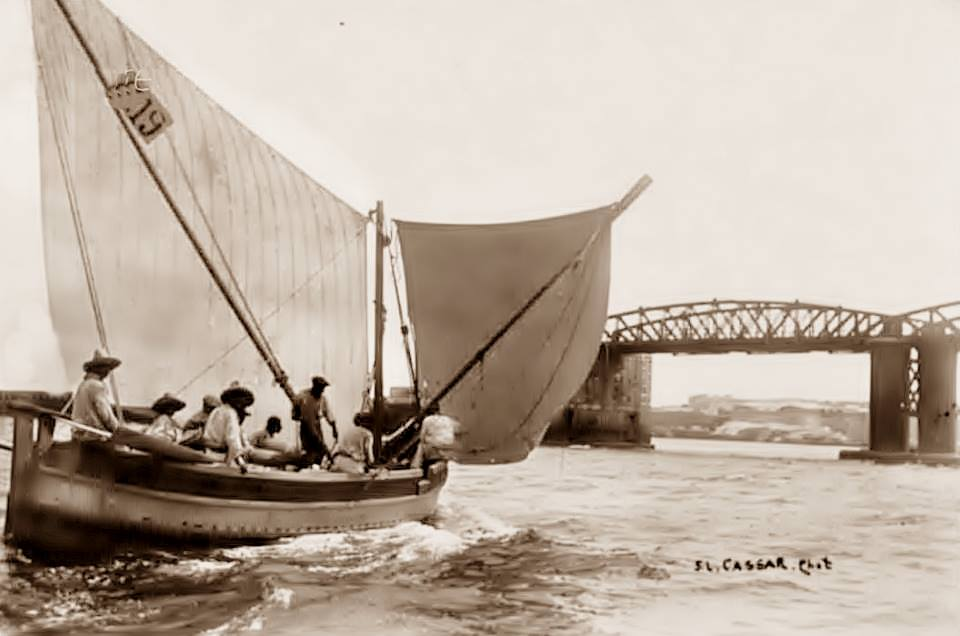
Early 20th century photo by S. L. Cassar of a Gozo boat heading towards the original St Elmo Bridge

In the 19th and 20th centuries, the Grand Harbour was a major British naval base. In 1900 the Admiralty began making plans to construct a breakwater so as to protect the harbour from both the rough seas as well as potential enemy intrusion. The breakwater was built out of limestone and concrete, and it consisted of two sections with a lighthouse on each end. The larger arm of the breakwater was linked to the foreshore near Fort Saint Elmo, with the smaller one being linked to Fort Ricasoli. The tender to construct the breakwater was issued in 1902, and it was won by S. Pearson & Sons. The foundation stone was laid down by King Edward VII on 20 April 1903, and work began in 1905 and was completed in 1910. The total cost of the breakwater was around £1 million. (Note: Comparing early 20th-century costs and prices with those of today can be challenging. £1 million in 1910 could be equivalent to between £97 million and £951 million in 2018, depending on the price comparison used.)

It was deemed necessary to have a 70-metre-long (230 ft) gap between the larger section of the breakwater and the St Elmo foreshore, so as to prevent water inside the harbour from becoming stagnant and also allow small vessels to take a quicker route to the harbour. A steel footbridge was constructed across this gap in 1906, and it consisted of two spans of arched truss beams supported on a pair of cylindrical steel columns filled with concrete.

=== Destruction ===
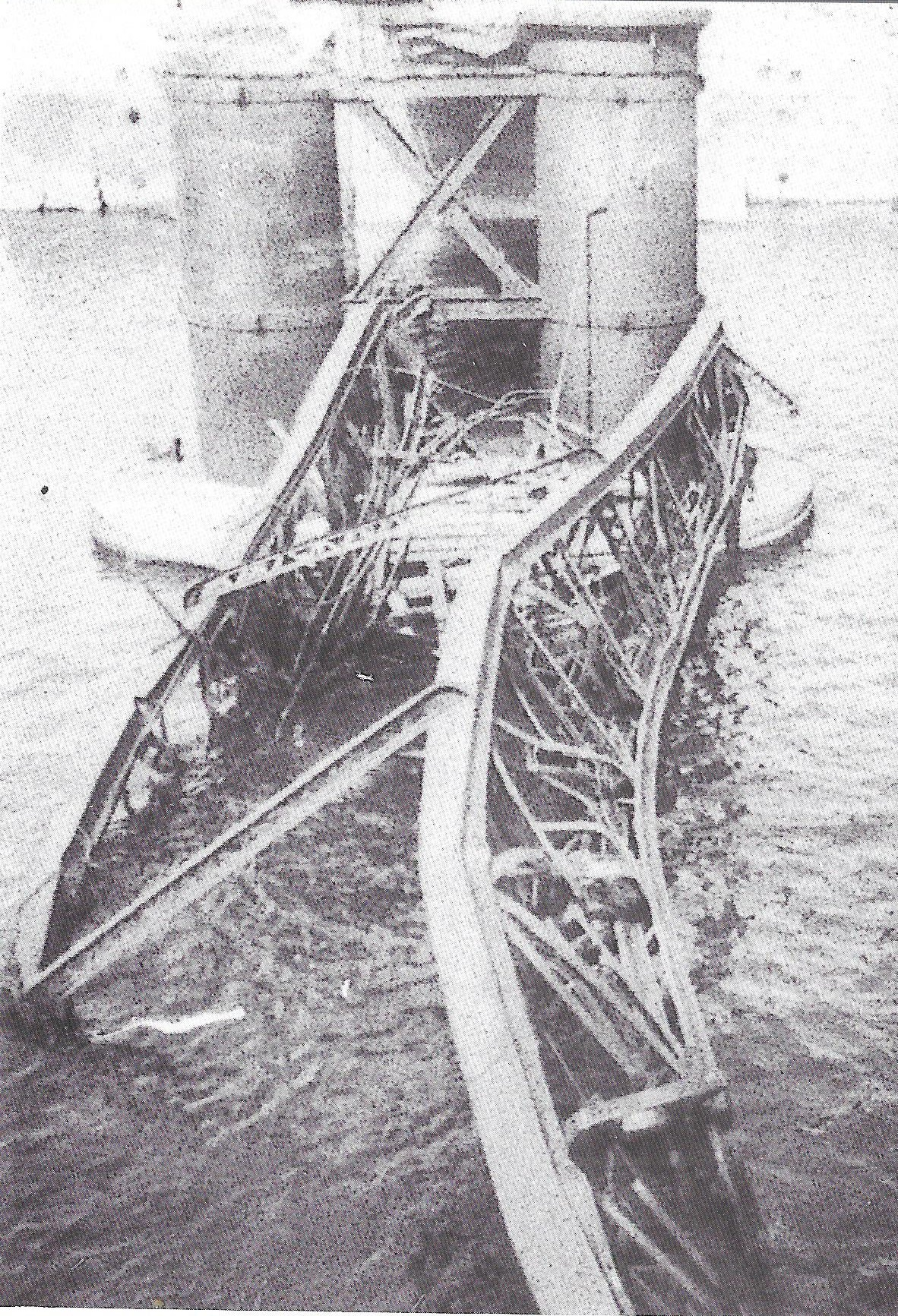
The collapsed bridge after the 1941 attack

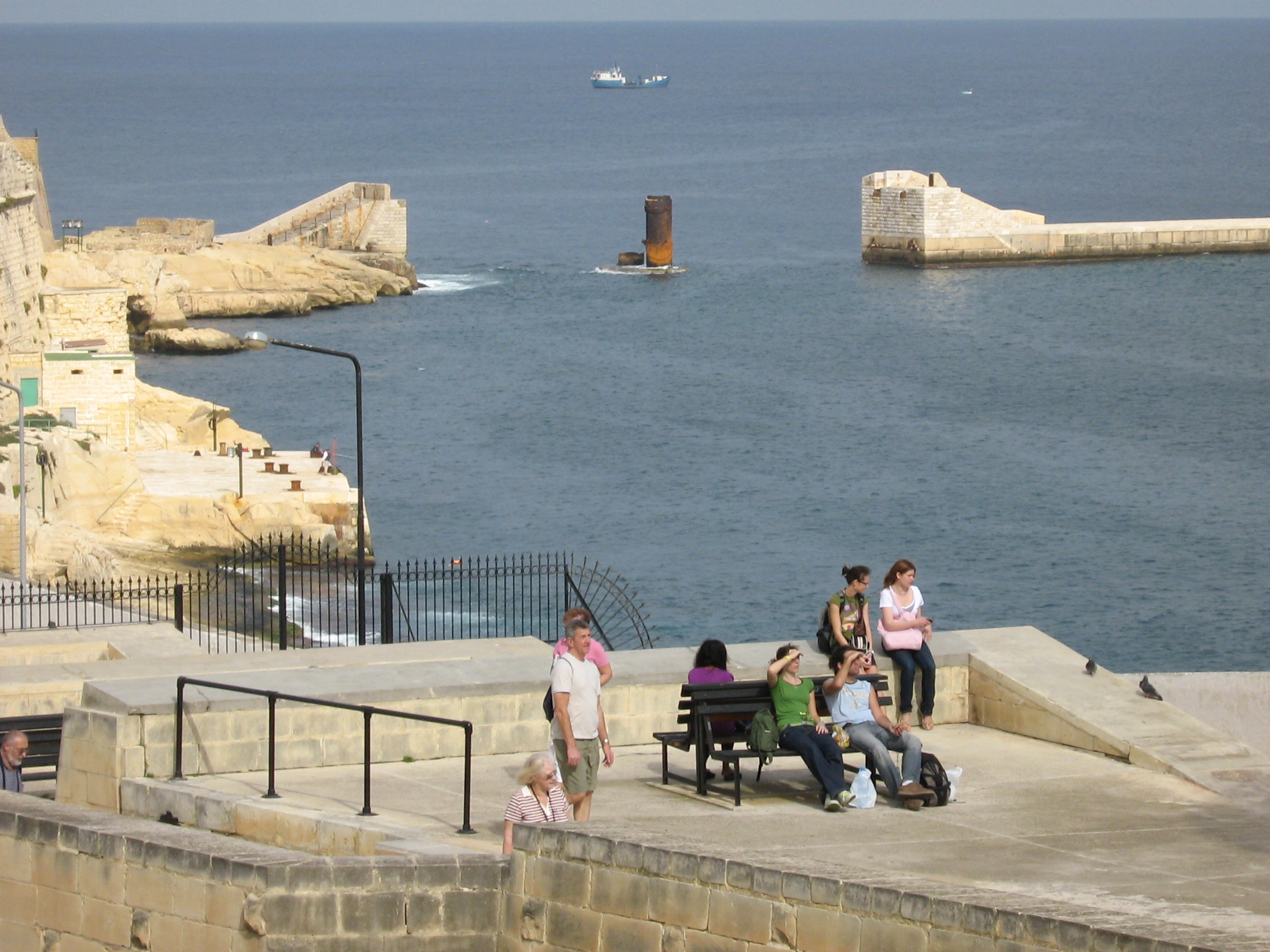
Site of the bridge in 2007

On the night of 25–26 July 1941, during World War II, the Decima Flottiglia MAS of the Italian Regia Marina launched an attack on the harbour using MAS motorboats, MT explosive motorboats and SLC Maiale human torpedoes. One of the SLCs was supposed to attack the bridge, which had nets blocking the entrance to the harbour, allowing the other vessels to enter the breach and attack naval shipping inside the harbour. The element of surprise was lost when the British detected the impending attack using radar, which the Italians had not anticipated.

The attack on the bridge was launched at 04:46 on 26 July. The explosives in the first craft did not detonate, prompting the pilot of another craft to smash his explosive motorboat against the bridge in a suicide mission. The craft hit one of the bridge's columns, and it detonated the explosives in the first boat, causing one of the spans to collapse. This did not allow access to the harbour; on the contrary the collapsed span ended up completely blocking the entrance. The coastal batteries of Fort Saint Elmo subsequently opened fire on the attackers, and most of the vessels were destroyed, with a few being captured.

The collapsed span was removed after the attack, and the rest of the bridge was subsequently demolished after the war. All that remained were the stone abutments on either side and parts of the central columns. The breakwater and lighthouse were subsequently only accessible by boat.

== Present bridge ==
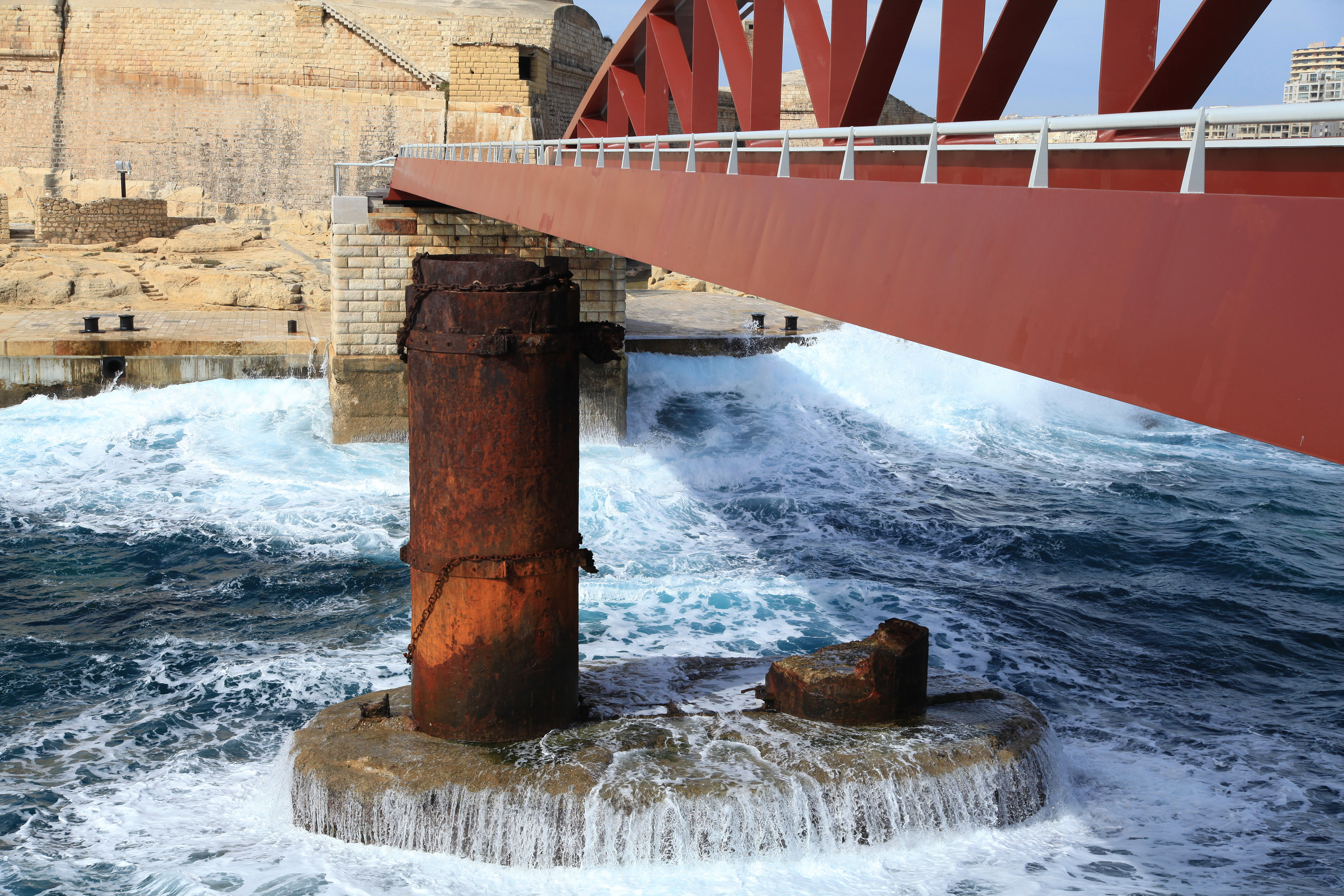
Remains of the columns of the 1906 bridge beneath the present bridge

The intention to construct a replica of the bridge on the site was announced in 2007. However, it became apparent that a reconstruction in accordance with the original design would not be financially feasible due to the quantity of steel required. When a tender for design, fabrication and construction of the bridge was issued on 18 September 2009, it called for a single-span bridge with a new design echoing the style of the original. The construction of a new bridge formed part of a larger project to regenerate Valletta, which also included the reconstruction of City Gate and the Barrakka Lift, among other projects.

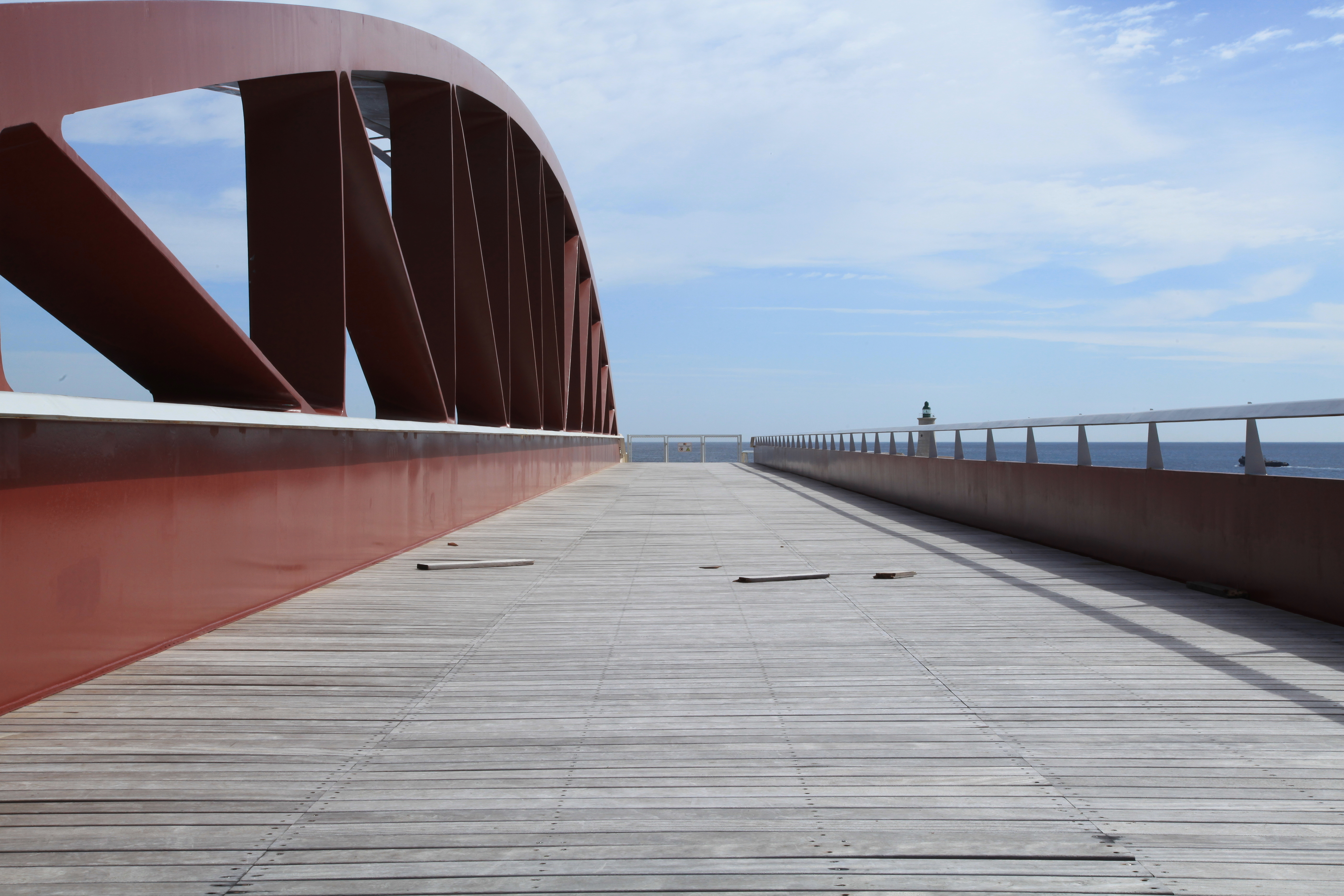
The bridge's deck

The single-span steel bridge weighs 190 tonnes (190 long tons; 210 short tons), and it is 70 metres (230 ft) long and 5.5 metres (18 ft) wide. It has an asymmetrical L-shaped cross section, with an arched truss facing the seaward side. It is supported on the stone abutments of the original bridge, and the remains of the columns were also retained, although they are not connected to the modern bridge. The bridge was designed by the Spanish architects Arenas & Asociados, and it was fabricated at A Coruña before being shipped to Malta on board the Storman Asia. Bezzina & Cole Architects along with the contractor Vassallo Builders were responsible for putting the bridge in place, and the installation took place on 5 October 2011. The lighting system was designed by Anthony Magro of Calleja Limited. The project cost €2.8 million. The bridge was designed to last for 120 years.

The bridge was inaugurated on 24 July 2012 by Austin Gatt, the Minister for Infrastructure, Transport and Communications, and it was subsequently opened to the public. The bridge received mixed reactions from the public, with some praising its design and the fact that it restored the original appearance of the breakwater, while critics disapproved of the cost of construction and called it a "bridge to nowhere." Since its inauguration it has become a landmark, and it has occasionally suffered damage to its decking or railings, which have resulted in it being closed to the public for some periods of time to allow for repair works.
