= Grand Harbour =

Natural harbour in Valletta, Malta

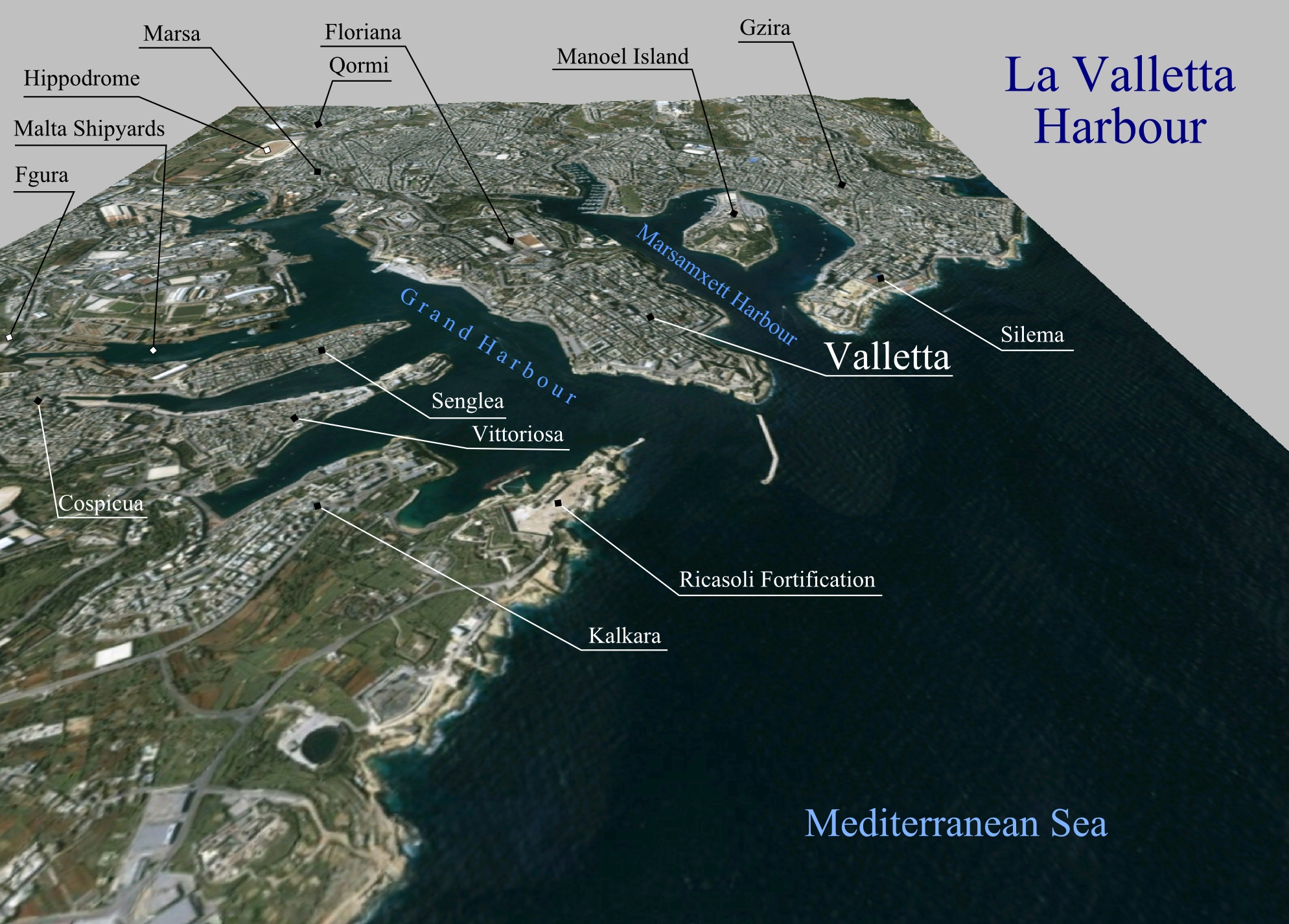
- The Grand Harbour from above
- Interactive map of Grand Harbour

Location
- Country: Malta
- Location: Southern Harbour Area

Details
- Type of Harbor: coastal natural
- Size of harbour: 2,035,000 square metres (503 acres)
- Maximum Length: 3.63 kilometres (2.26 mi)
- Maximum Width: 1.33 kilometres (0.83 mi)
- Average Depth: 7.7 metres (25 ft)

The Grand Harbour (Maltese: il-Port il-Kbir; Italian: Porto Grande), also known as the Port of Valletta, is a natural harbour on the island of Malta. It has been substantially modified over the years with extensive docks (Malta Dockyard), wharves, and fortifications.

== Description ==
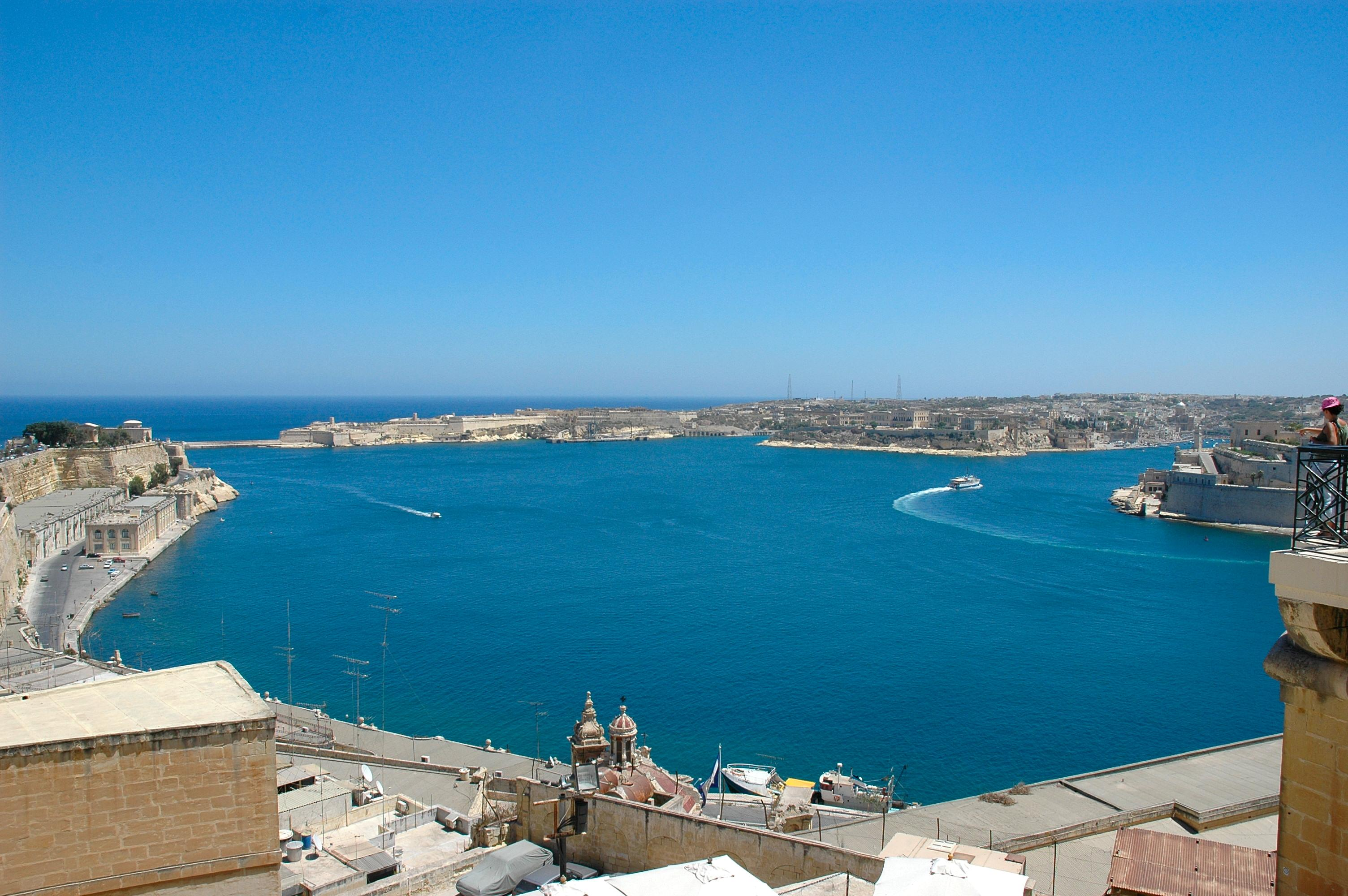
View of the Grand Harbour looking towards the sea

The harbour mouth faces north-east and is bounded to the north by Saint Elmo Point and further sheltered by an isolated breakwater and is bounded to the south by Ricasoli Point. Its north-western shore is formed by the Sciberras Peninsula, which is largely covered by the city of Valletta and its suburb Floriana. This peninsula also divides Grand Harbour from a second parallel natural harbour, Marsamxett Harbour. The main waterway of Grand Harbour continues inland almost to Marsa. The southeastern shore of the harbour is formed by a number of inlets and headlands, principally Rinella Creek, Kalkara Creek, Dockyard Creek, and French Creek, which are covered by Kalkara and the Three Cities: Cospicua, Vittoriosa, and Senglea. The harbour has been described as Malta's greatest geographic asset.

With its partner harbour of Marsamxett, Grand Harbour lies at the centre of gently rising ground. Settlements have grown all around the twin harbours and up the slopes so that the whole bowl is effectively one large conurbation. Much of Malta's population lives within a three kilometer radius of Floriana. This is now one of the most densely populated areas in Europe. The harbours and the surrounding areas make up Malta's Northern and Southern Harbour Districts. Together, these districts contain 27 of the 68 local councils. They have a population of 213,722 which is over 47% of the total population of the Maltese islands.

== History ==
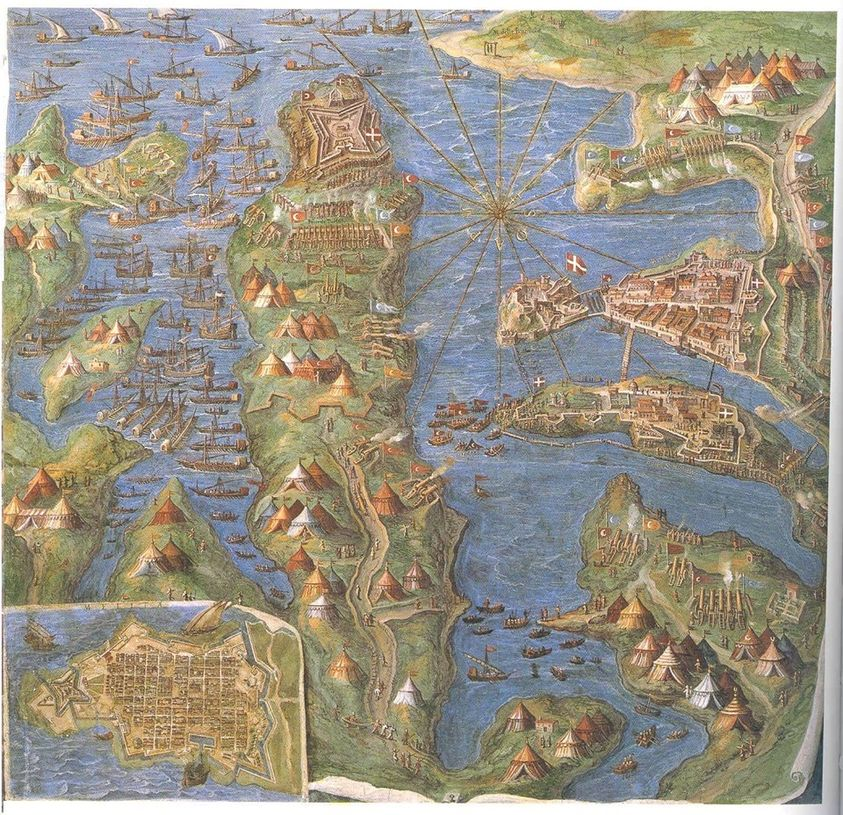
View of the Grand Harbour during the Great Siege of Malta in 1565

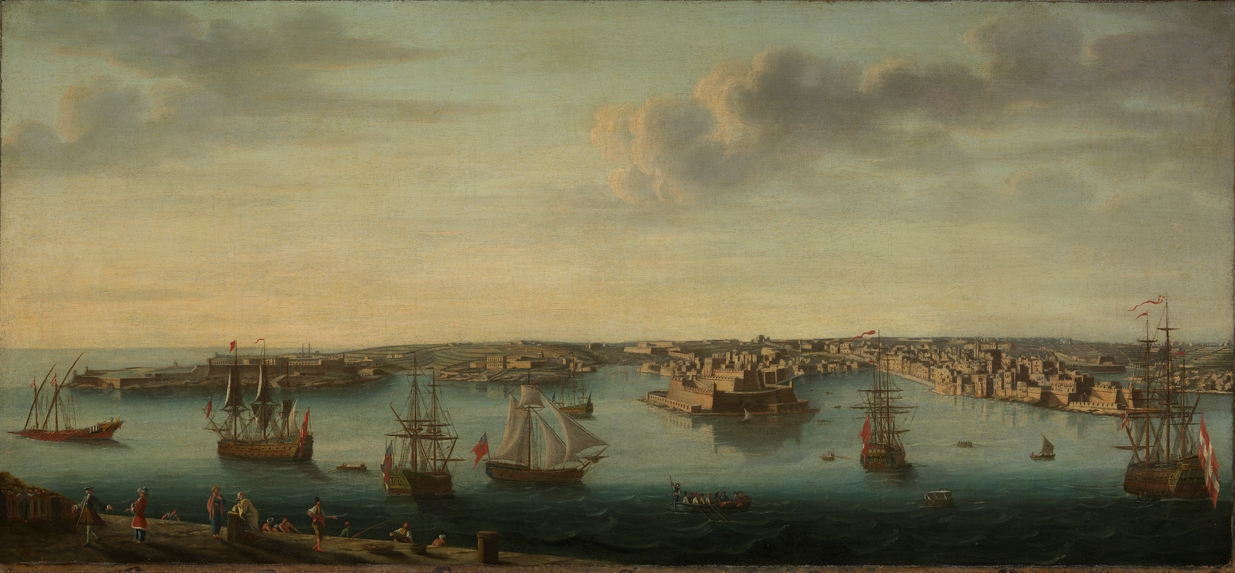
The Grand Harbour in 1750

The Maltese islands have a long history, mainly due to their strategic location and natural harbours, mainly the Grand Harbour as well as Marsamxett. The Grand Harbour has been used since prehistoric times.

Megalithic remains have been found on the shores of the Grand Harbour. The Kordin Temples, the earliest of which date back to around 3700 BC, overlooked the harbour from Corradino Heights. Another megalithic structure possibly existed underwater off Fort Saint Angelo, but this can no longer be seen. Punic and Roman remains were also found on the shores of the harbour, with the main Carthaginian port at Cospicua possibly having been the original namesake of the island in Greek and Latin.

By the 12th and 13th centuries, the Castrum Maris had been built in what is now Birgu. It might have been built instead of ancient buildings, possibly Phoenician or Roman temples, or an Arab fortress.

In 1283, the Battle of Malta was fought at the entrance of the Grand Harbour. Aragonese forces defeated a larger Angevin force and captured 10 galleys.

The Grand Harbour was the base for the Order of Saint John for 268 years, from 1530 to 1798. They settled in the city of Birgu and improved its fortifications, including rebuilding the Castrum Maris as Fort Saint Angelo. In July 1551, Barbary corsairs and Ottoman forces raided Malta. They landed at Marsamxett and marched upon the Grand Harbour, but did not attack as they found the town of Birgu too well fortified to attack. Although this attempt was unsuccessful, the Ottoman force later managed to sack Gozo and conquer Tripoli within the same campaign. After the attack, Fort Saint Elmo and Fort Saint Michael were built to better protect the harbour in any future attacks. The city of Senglea was also founded soon afterwards.

Later on in the 1550s, a tornado struck the Grand Harbour, killing 600 people and destroying a shipping armada.

The area was the scene of much of the fighting in the Great Siege of Malta of 1565 when the Ottomans attempted to eject the Order of St John but were ultimately defeated. After the siege, the capital city of Valletta was built on the Sciberras peninsula on the north west shore of the harbour. Over the years, more fortifications and settlements were founded within the Grand Harbour, including Fort Ricasoli and the towns of Floriana and Cospicua.

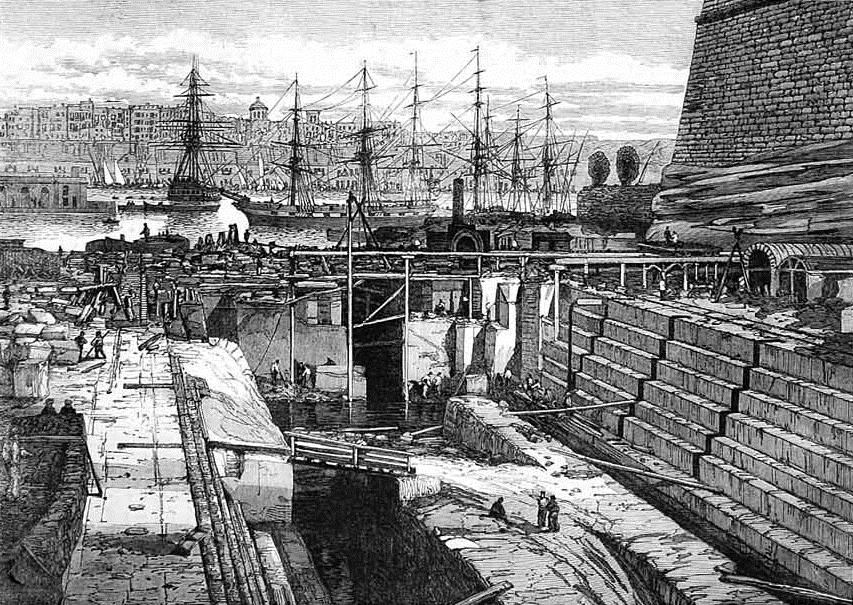
New dock built in 1867

During the French occupation of Malta, the harbour area was blockaded by Maltese rebels on land and the Royal Navy at sea. The French eventually capitulated in September 1800 and Malta became a British protectorate, later a colony. During the British colonial rule, the harbour became a strategic base for the Royal Navy and the base of the Mediterranean Fleet.

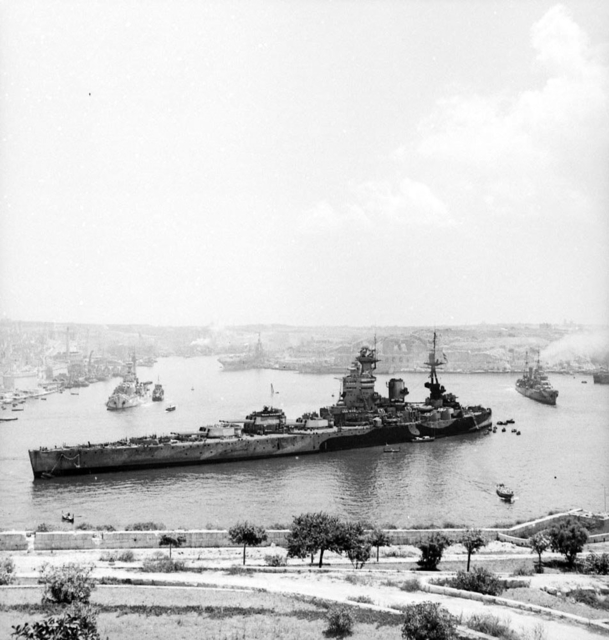
HMS Rodney in the harbour during the Allied invasion of Sicily.

The whole area was savagely bombed during the Second Siege of Malta during World War II, as the docks and military installations around the port became targets for Axis bombers. However collateral damage wrecked much of Valletta and The Three Cities, and caused large numbers of civilian casualties. An Italian naval raid on the harbour was repelled early on the 26th of July 1941.

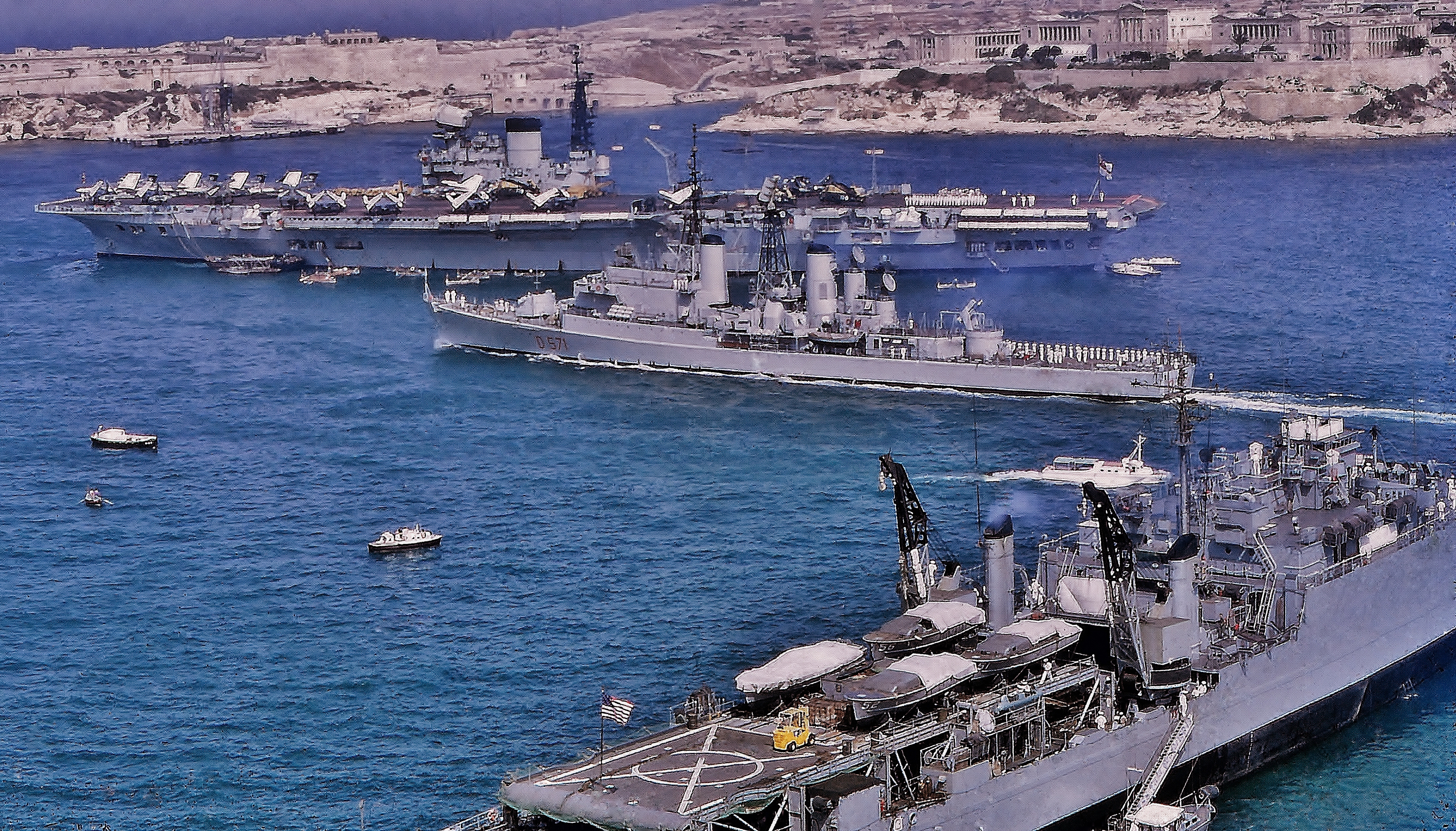
NATO warships in the harbour in 1967.

Grand Harbour includes a shipyard at the Malta Dockyard that is still active, but with the departure of the Royal Navy the harbour lost much of its military significance. A considerable part of Malta's commercial shipping is now handled by the Malta Freeport near Birżebbuġa, so the harbour is much quieter than it was in the first half of the 20th century.

In September 2007, the Maltese Government unveiled 20 proposed regeneration projects that would revamp the area while respecting its historic value.

As of May 2021 the harbour is undergoing renovation works initiated by Infrastructure Malta and sponsored by the European Union with the goals of electrifying the harbour to produce a 90% decrease in harmful emissions from ships. Shorepower units are to be installed to eliminate the need for fossil fuel-powered engines to run while ships are docked. Coordinates: 35°53′42″N 14°31′14″E

== Around the Grand Harbour from Fort Ricasoli to Fort St. Elmo ==
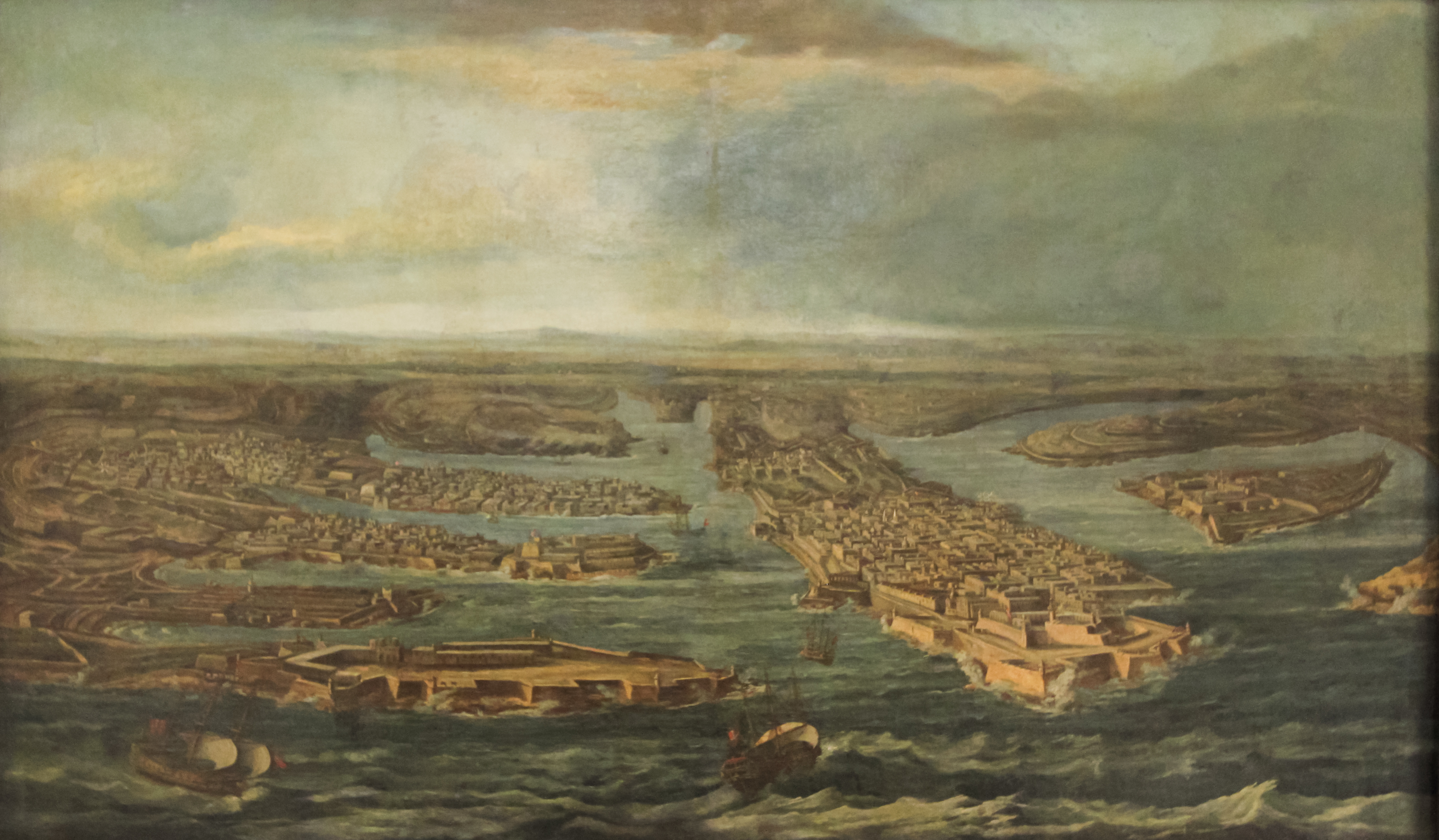
View of the Grand Harbour in the 18th century

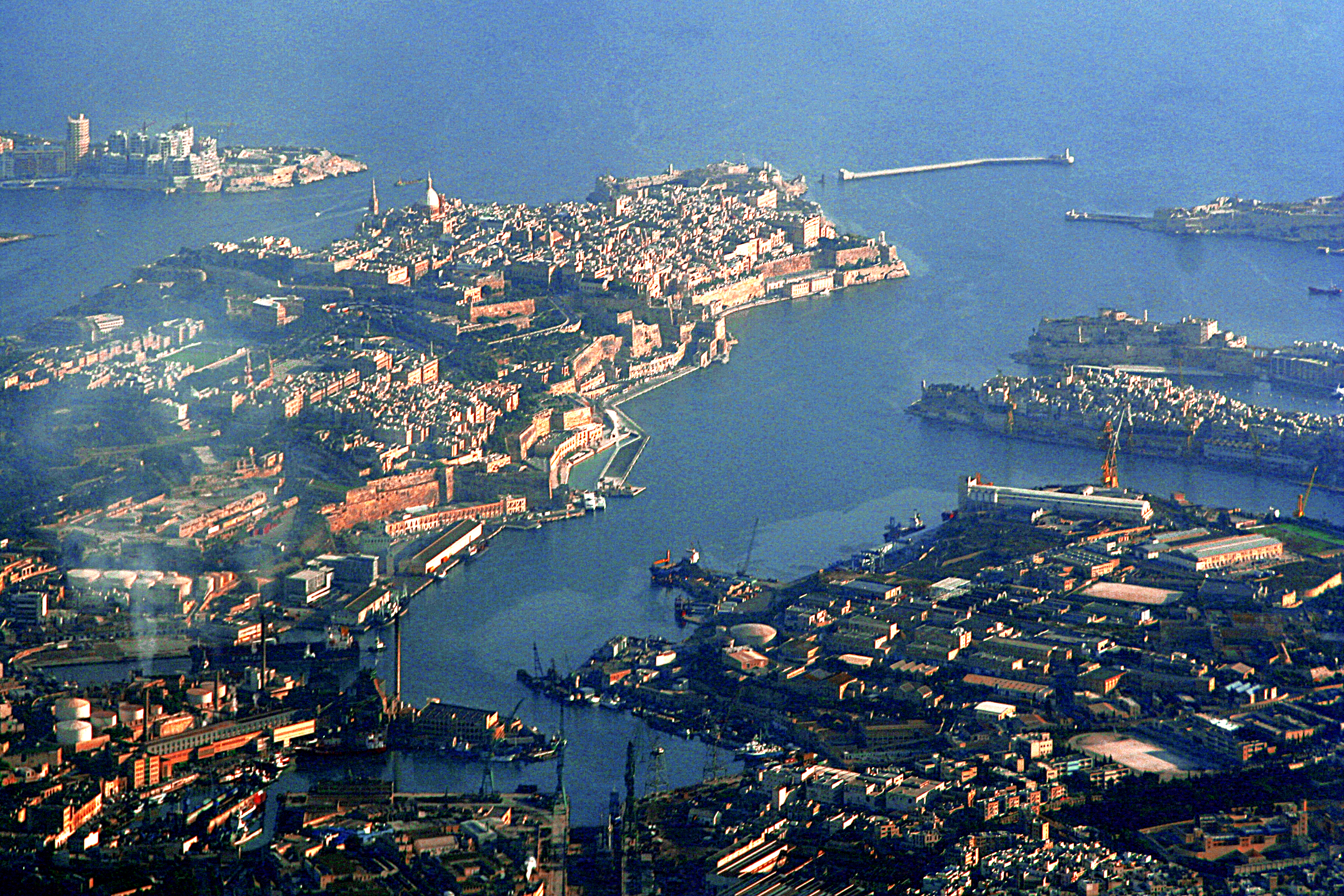
Aerial view of the Grand Harbour in 2006

- Fort Ricasoli
- Rinella Bay
- Bighi
- Kalkara Creek
  - Marina Road, Kalkara
  - Kalkara Strand, Kalkara
  - Mandraġġ Strand, Birgu
- Fort St. Angelo
- Dockyard Creek or Cottonera Marina
  - St. Angelo Strand, Birgu
  - Xatt il-Forn, Birgu
  - Xatt ir-Risq, Birgu
  - Xatt San Lawrenz, Birgu
  - Dock No. 1, Bormla
  - Xatt Juan B. Azzopardi, Senglea
- Fort Saint Michael
- French Creek
  - Dock No. 2
  - Ghajn Dwieli Road
  - Corradino
  - Dock No. 6
- Ras Ħanżir Point
- New Port
  - Shipwrights Wharf, Paola
  - Dock No. 7
  - Xatt il-Mollijiet, Albert Town
  - Church Wharf, Marsa
- Il-Menqa
  - Bridge Wharf, Marsa
  - Flagstone Wharf / Moll iċ-Ċangatura, Marsa
  - Lighters Wharf / il-Moll tal-Braken, Marsa
  - Timber Wharf / il-Moll tal-Ħatab, Marsa
  - Xatt l-Għassara tal-Għeneb, Marsa
- Valletta Waterfront or Pinto Wharf, Floriana
- Lascaris Wharf, Valletta
- Xatt il-Barriera, Valletta
- Taħt iż-Żiemel
- Fort St. Elmo

== Gallery ==
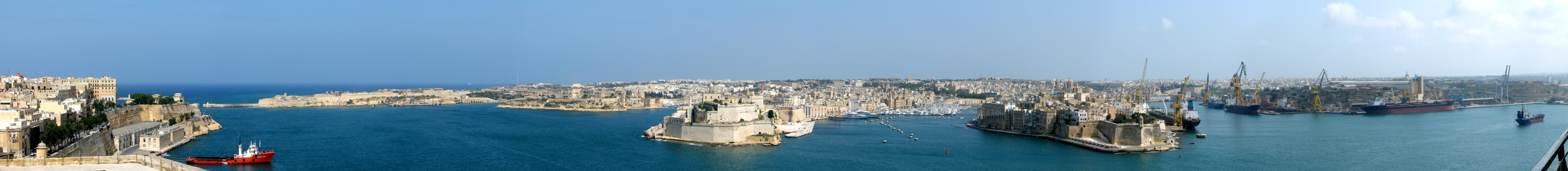
Grand Harbour looking eastwards, as seen from the Upper Barrakka Gardens
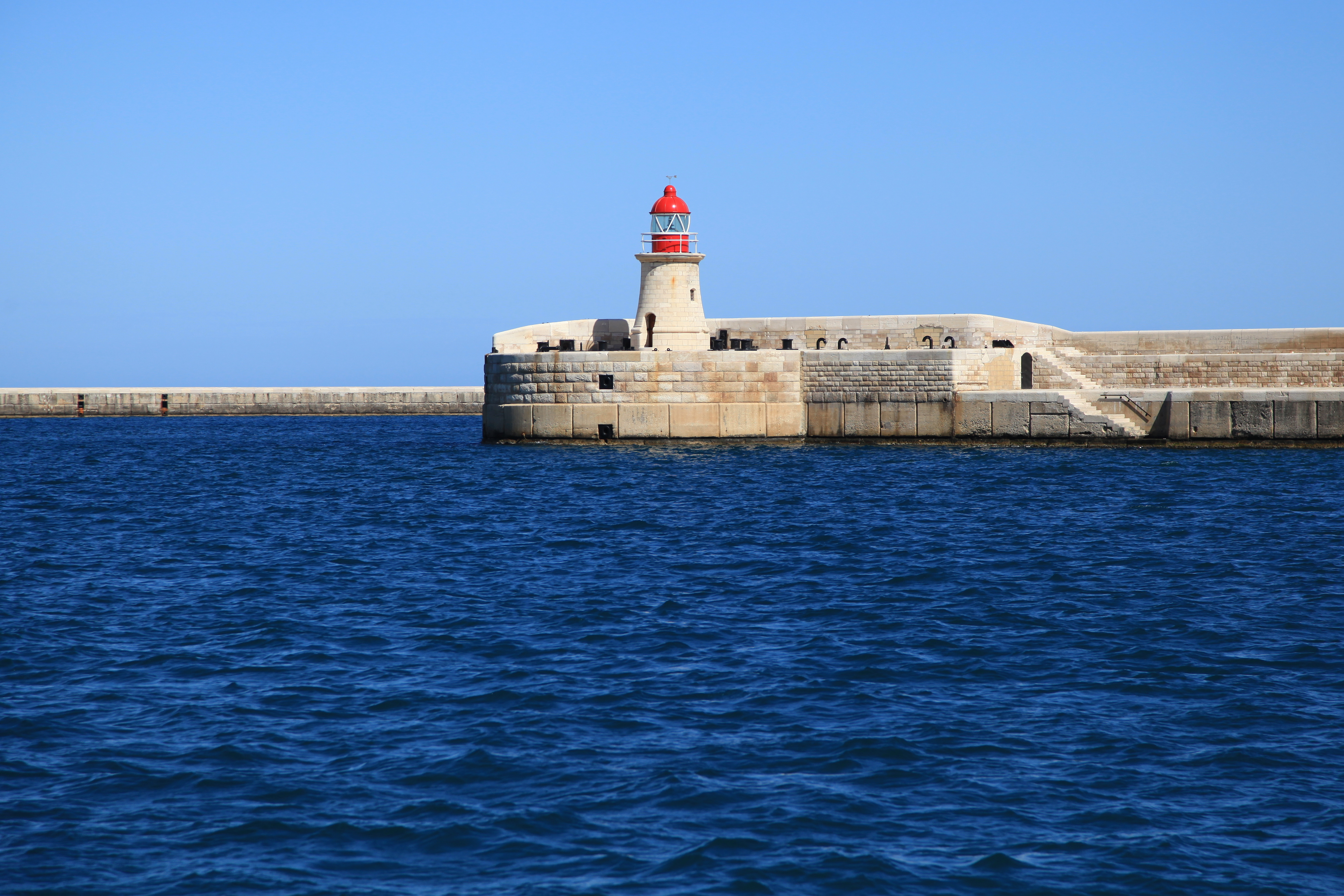
Ricasoli Breakwater
Kalkara

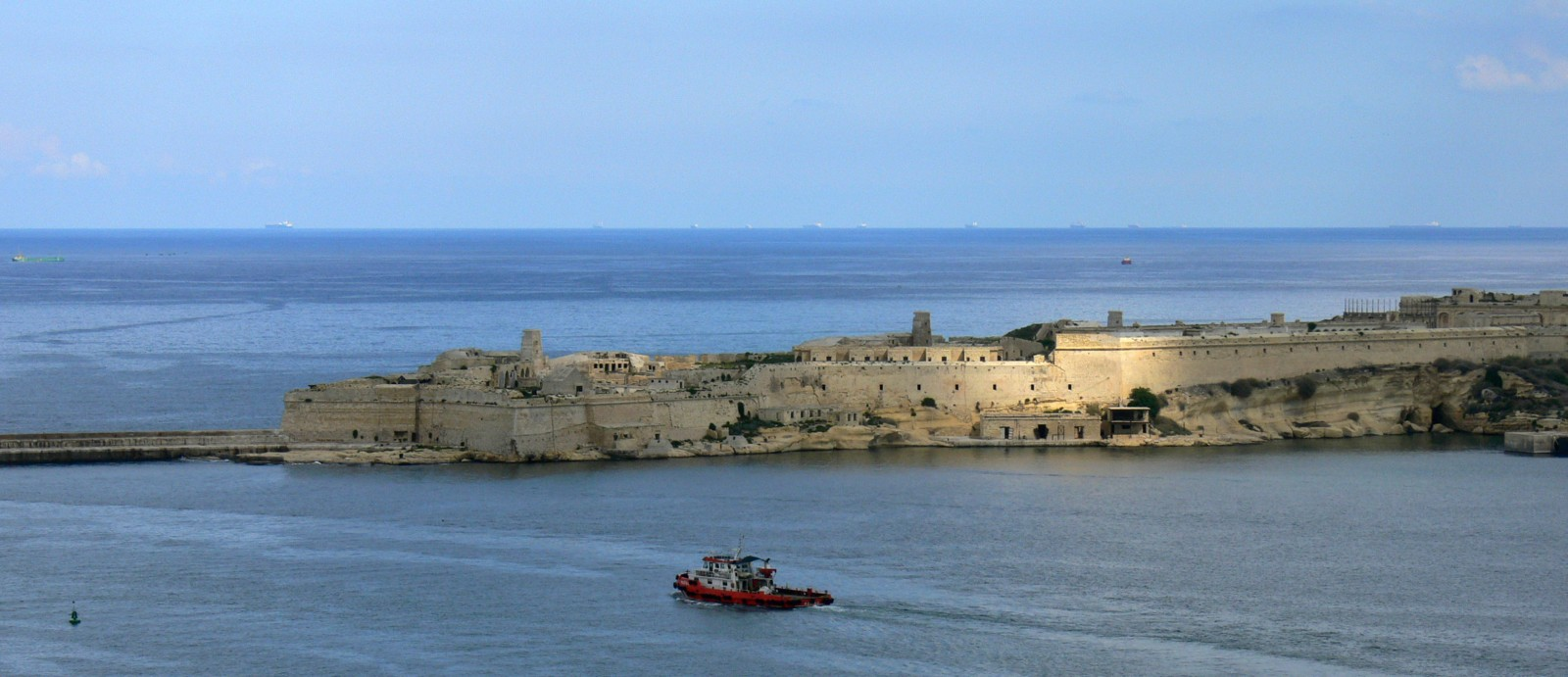
Fort Ricasoli
Kalkara

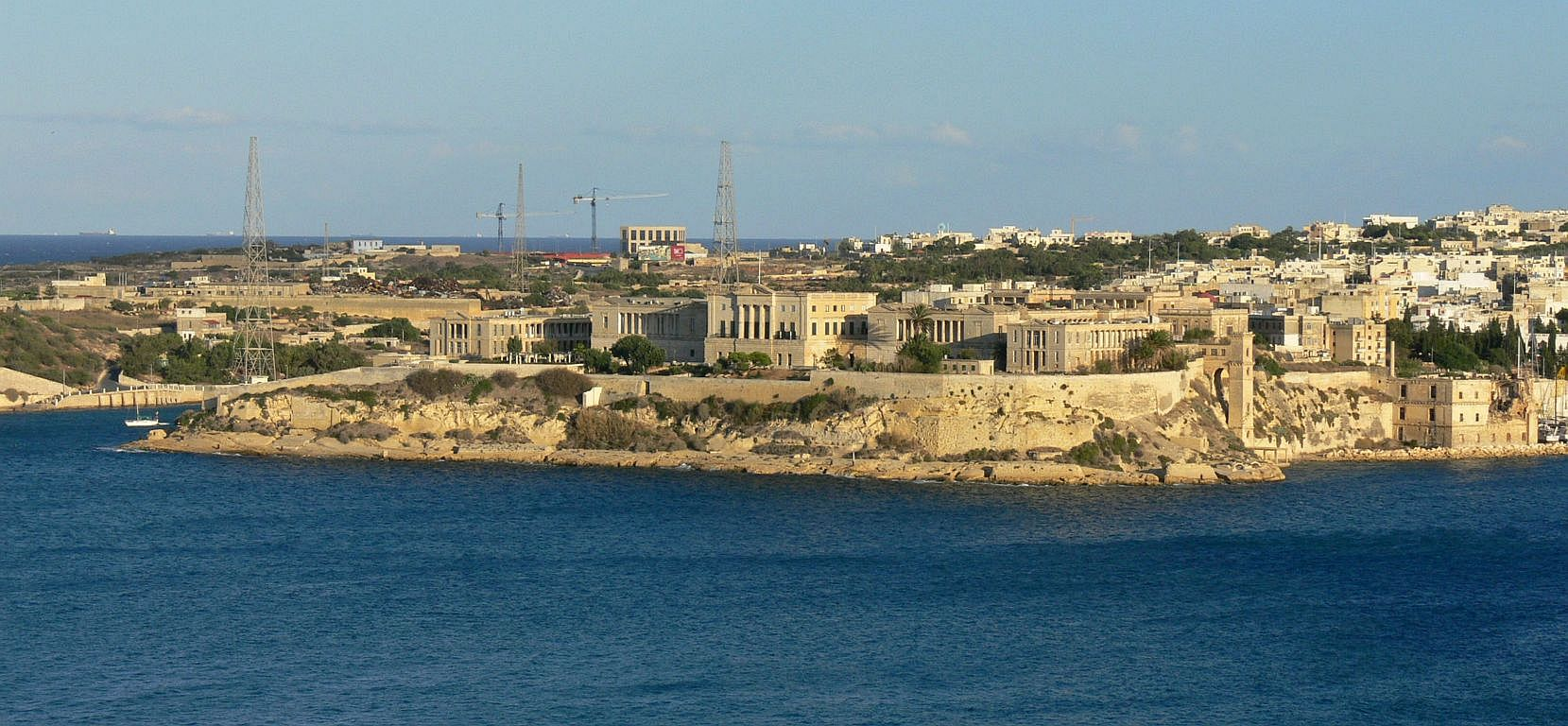
Bighi
Kalkara

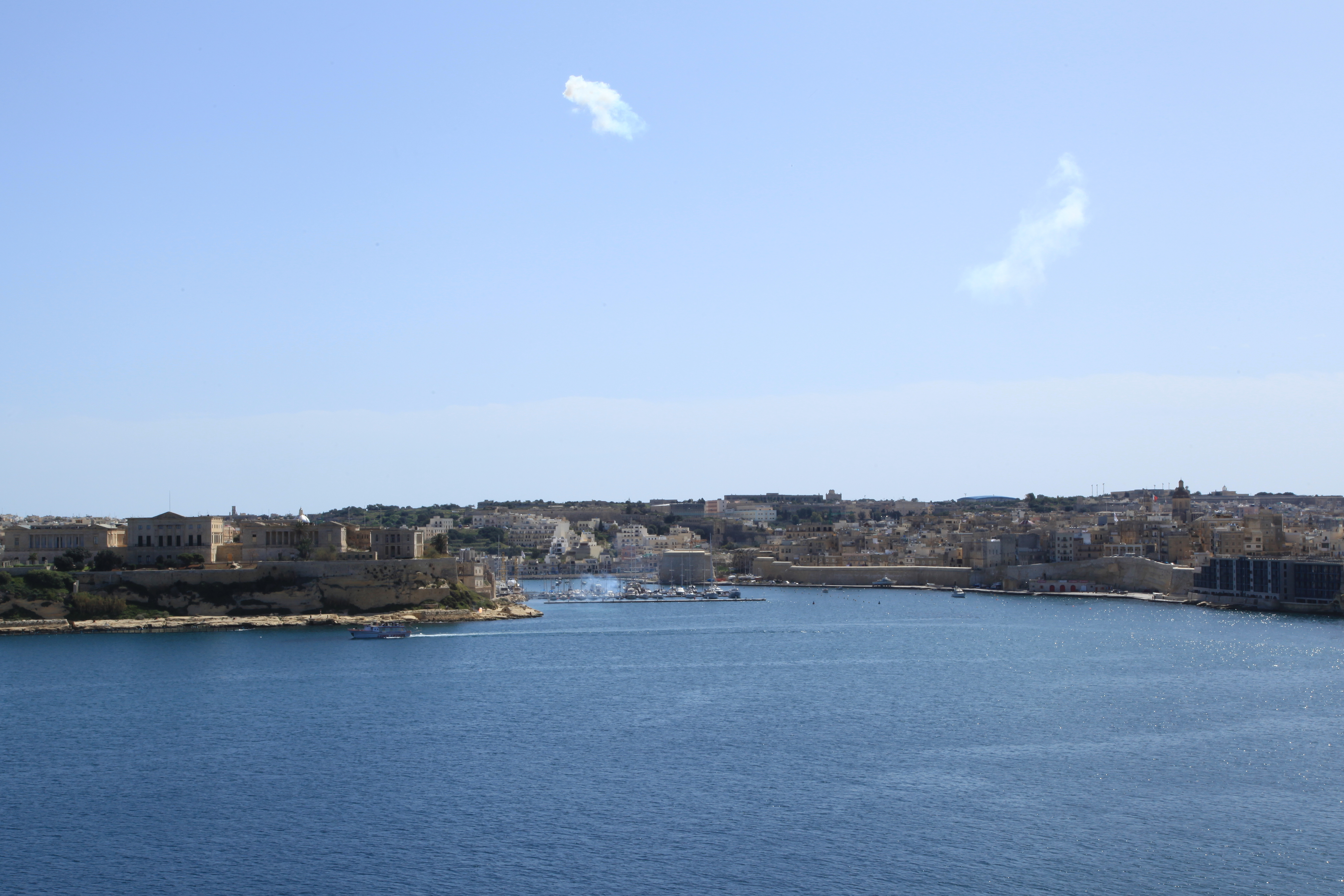
Kalkara Creek
Kalkara and Birgu

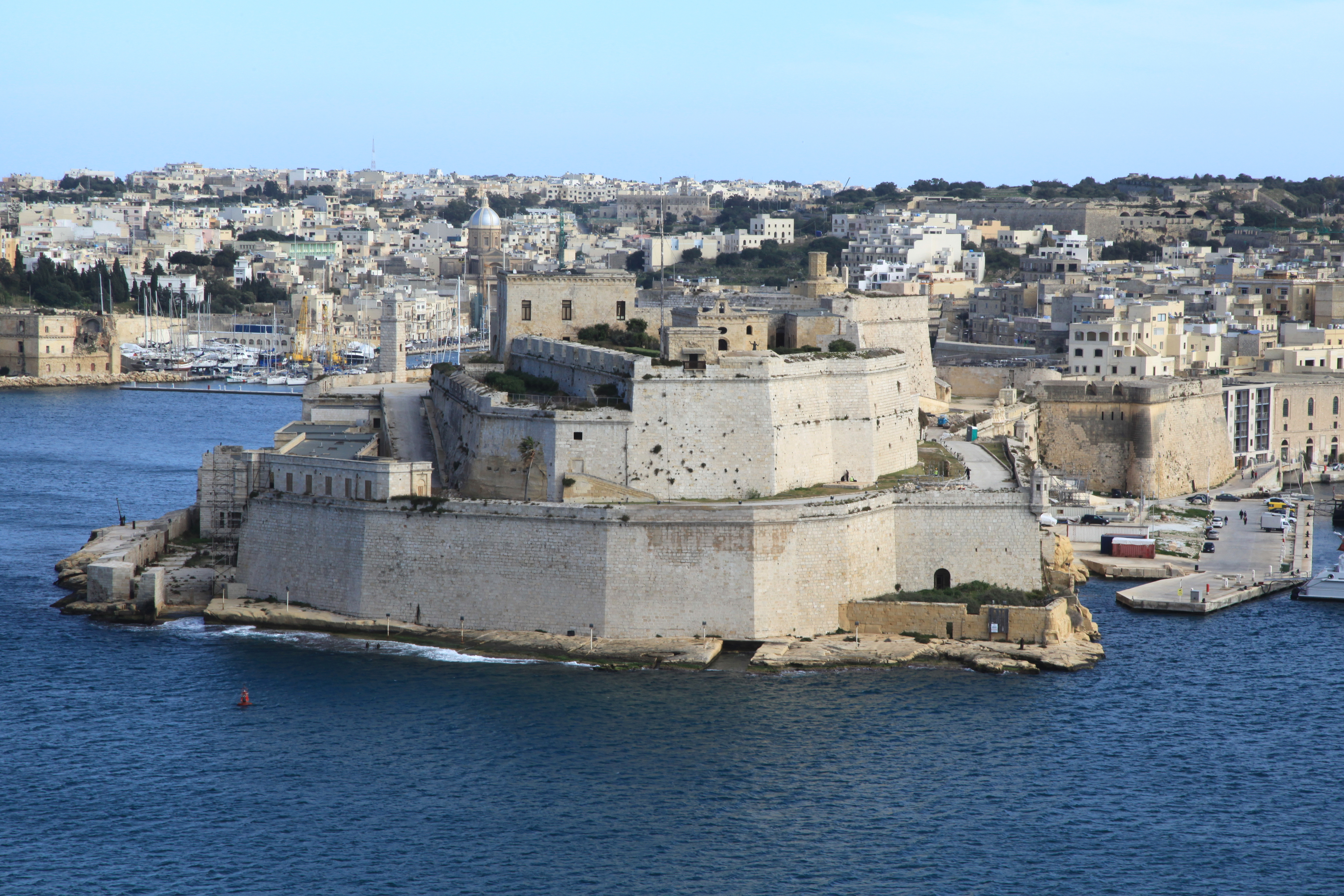
Fort Saint Angelo
Birgu

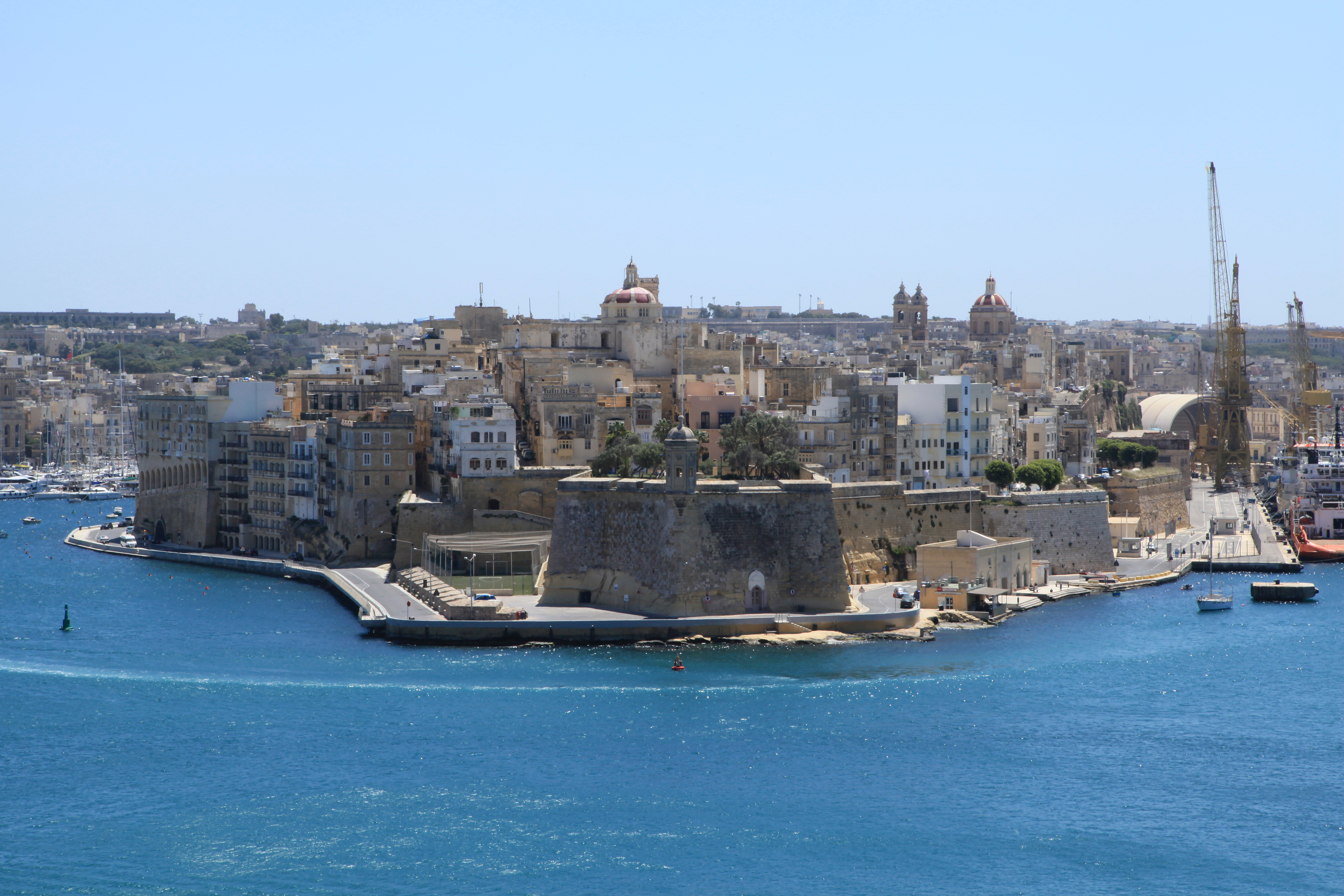
The Spur
Senglea

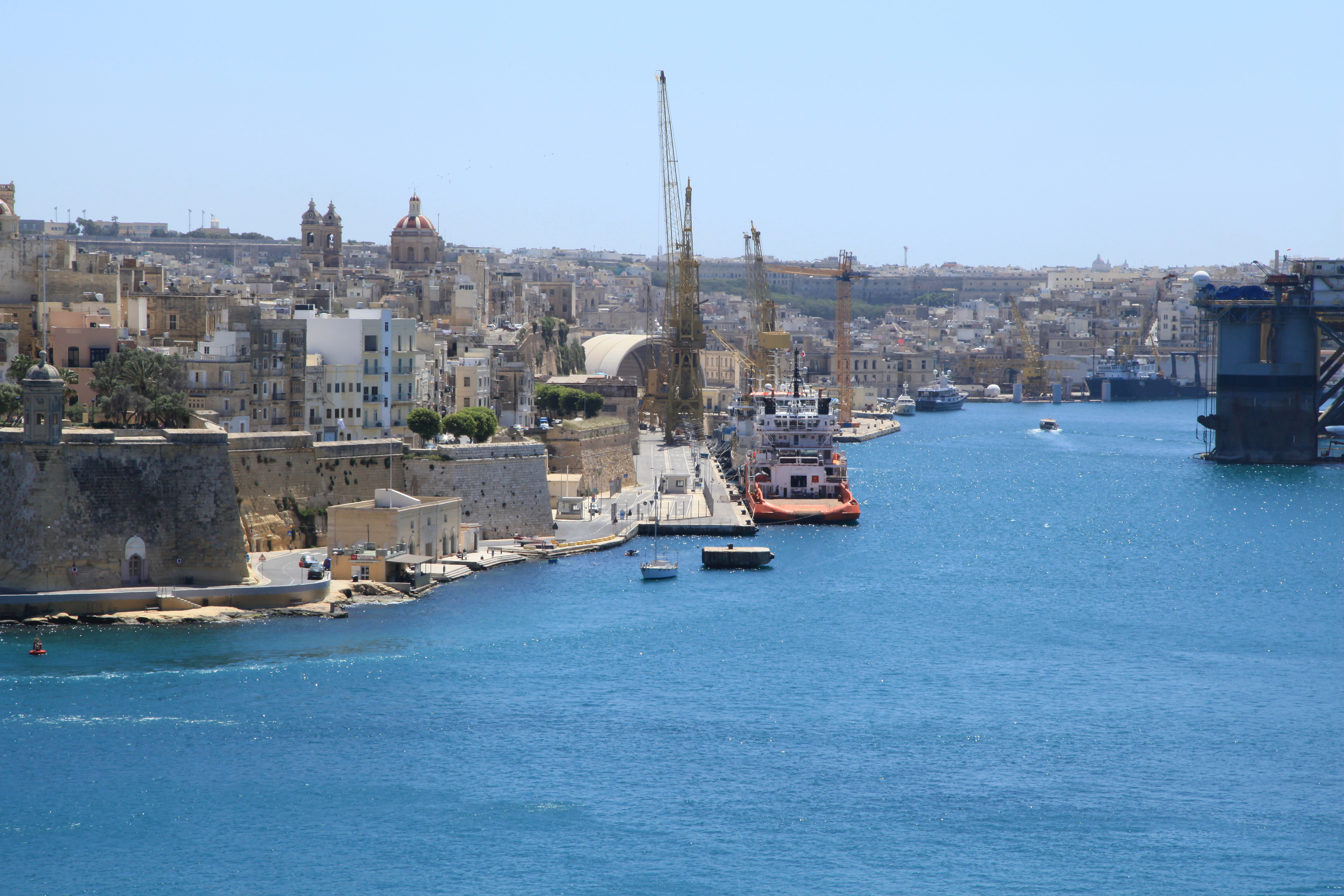
French Creek
Senglea, Cospicua and Paola

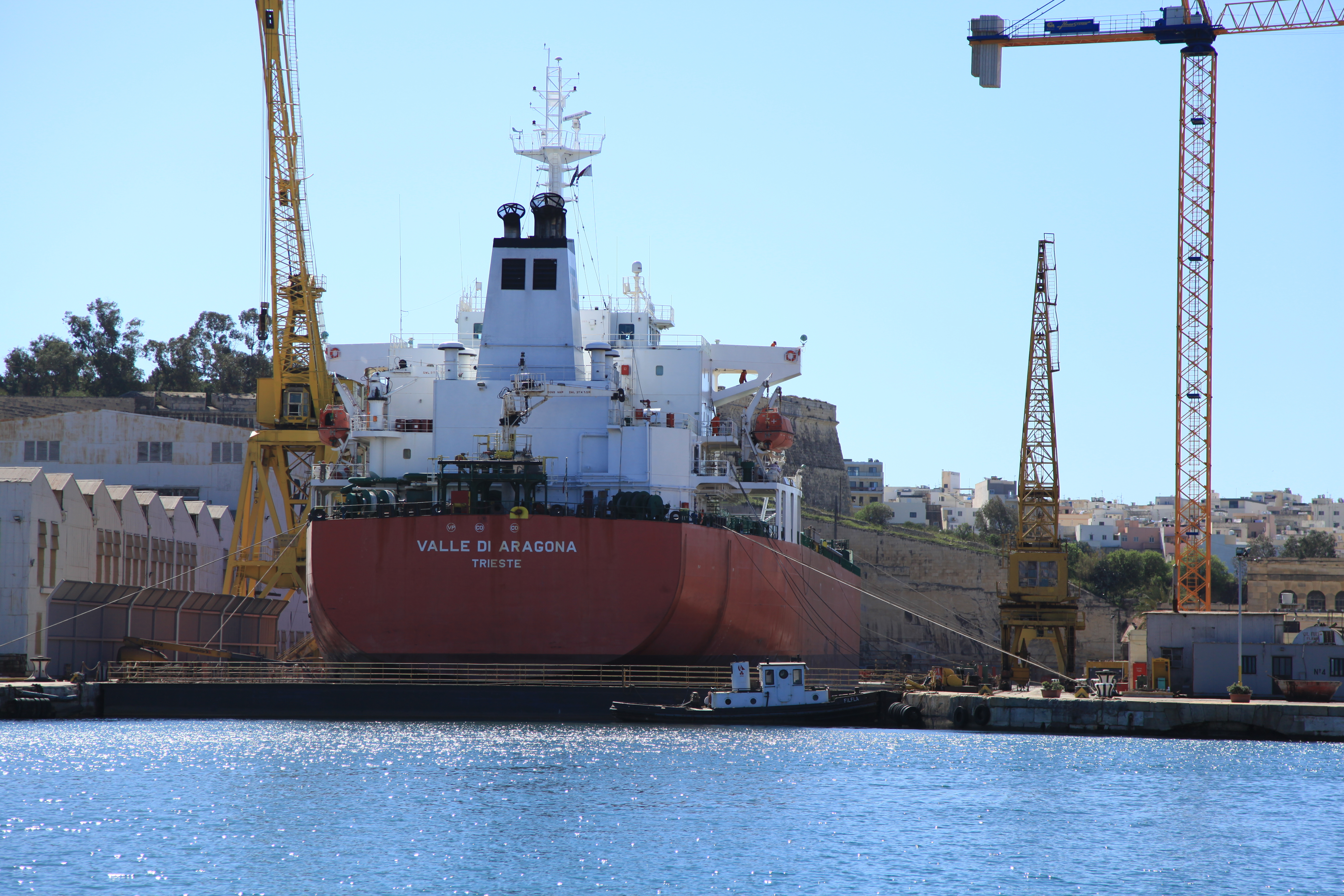
Dock No. 4
Cospicua

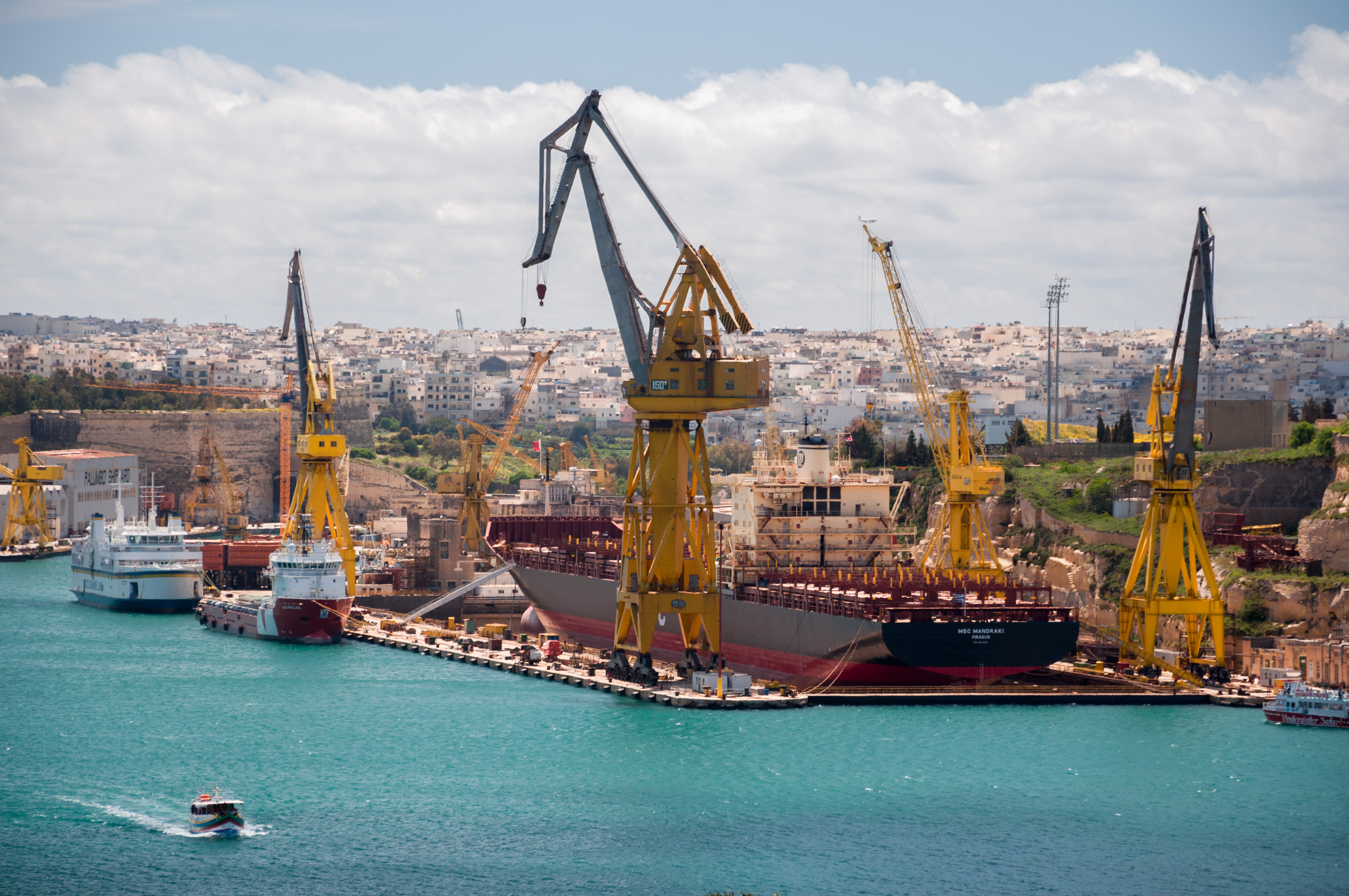
Dock No. 6 (China Dock)
Cospicua

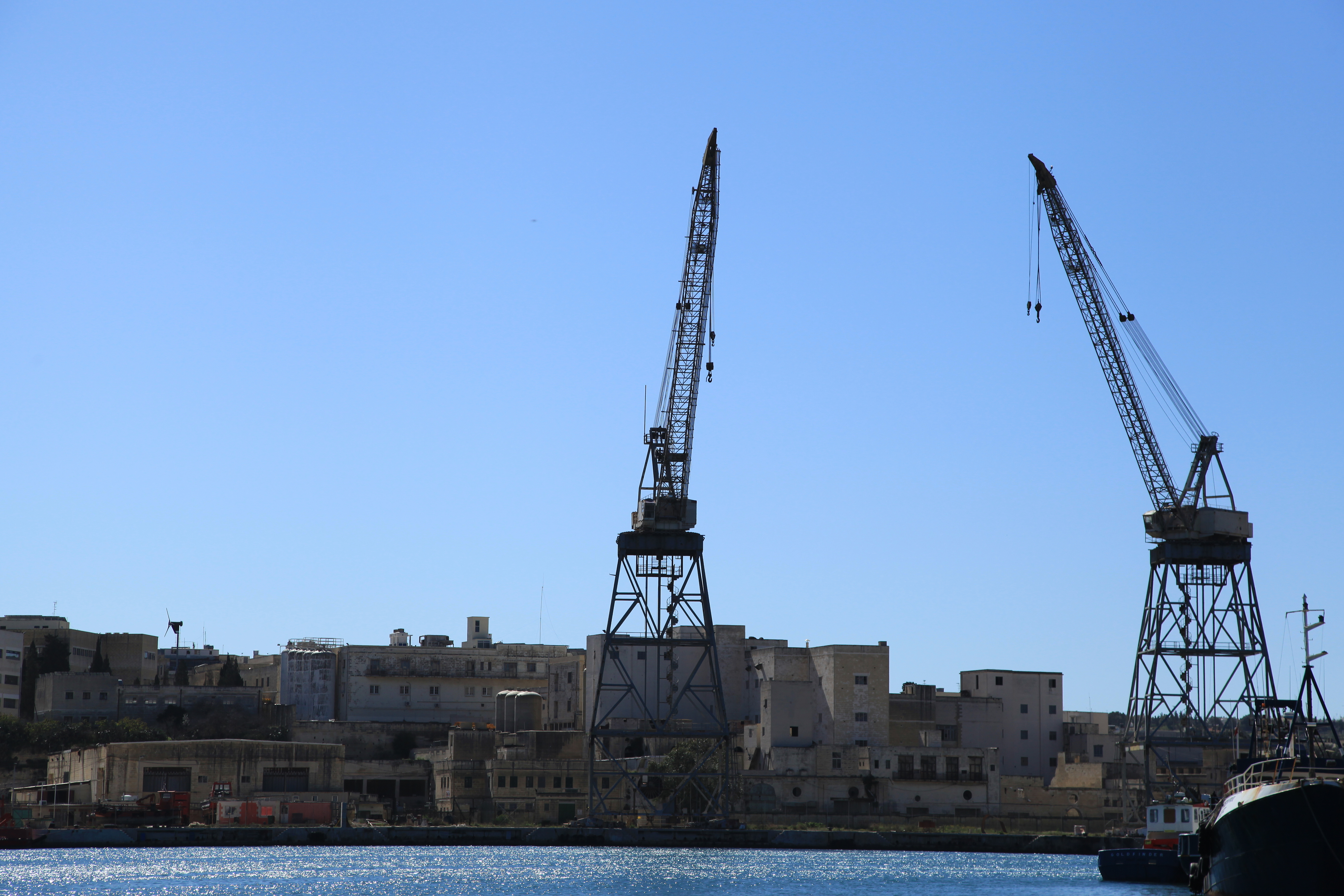
Shipwrights Wharf
Paola and Marsa

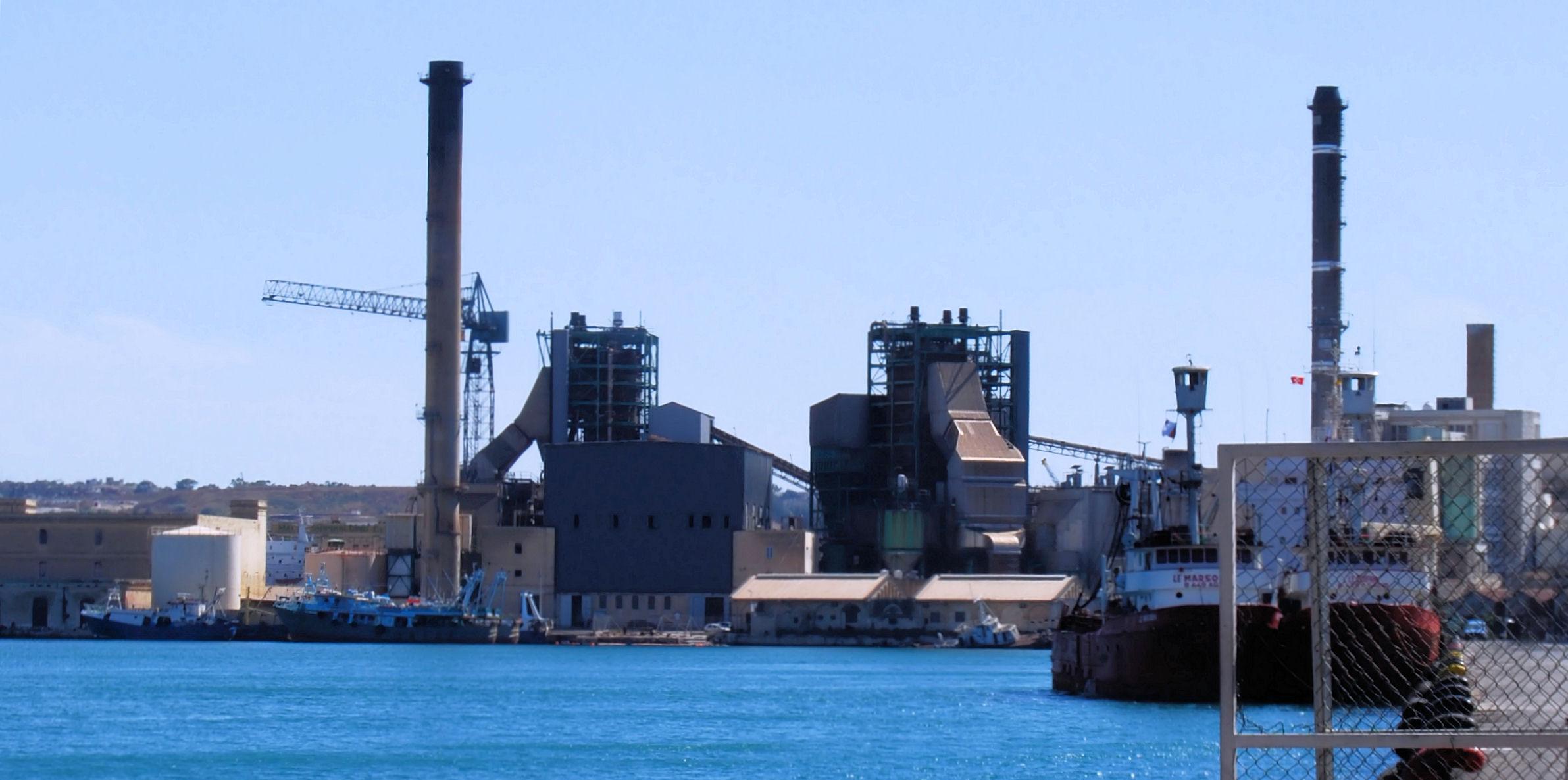
Bridge Wharf and Marsa Power Station
Marsa

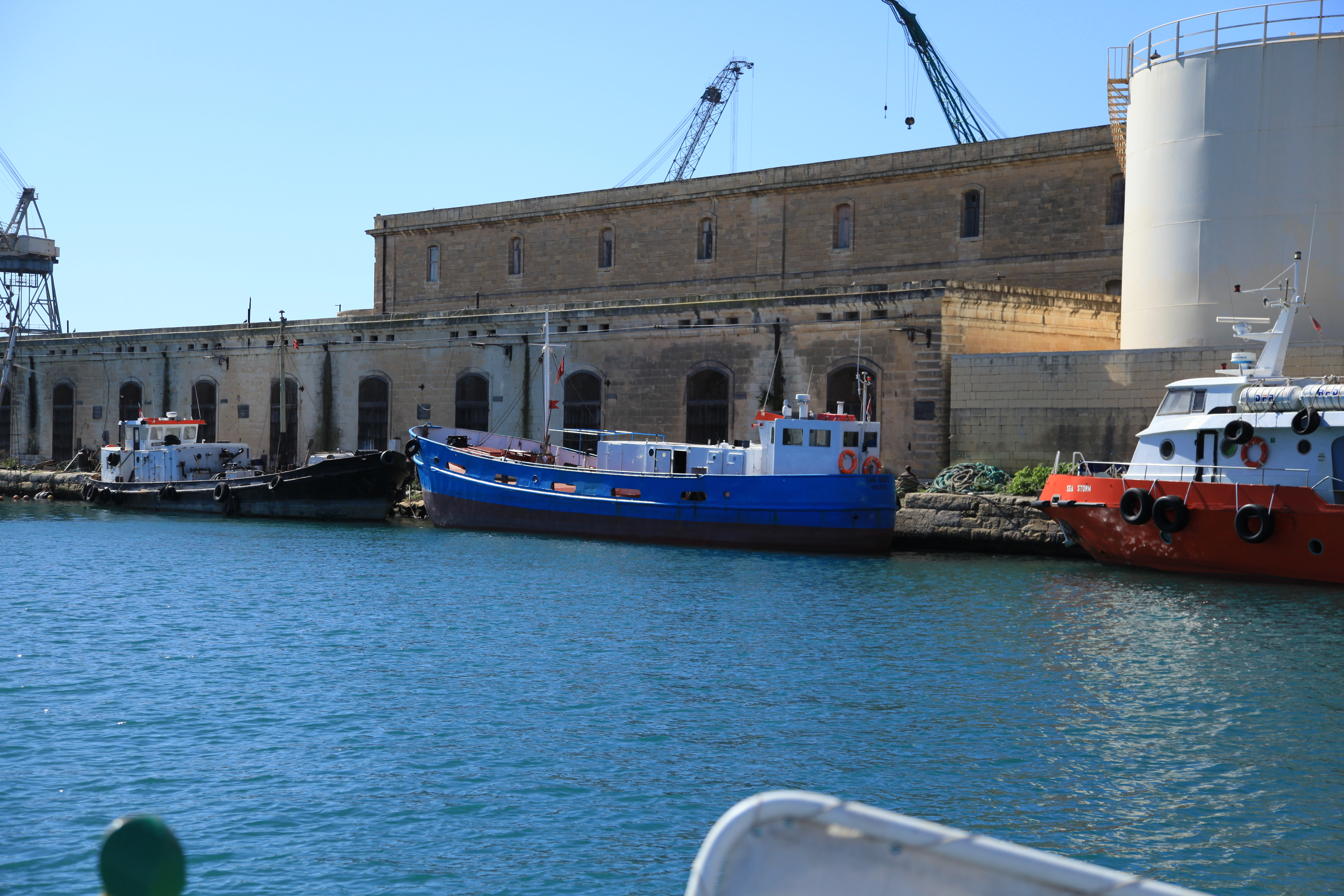
Braken Wharf
Marsa

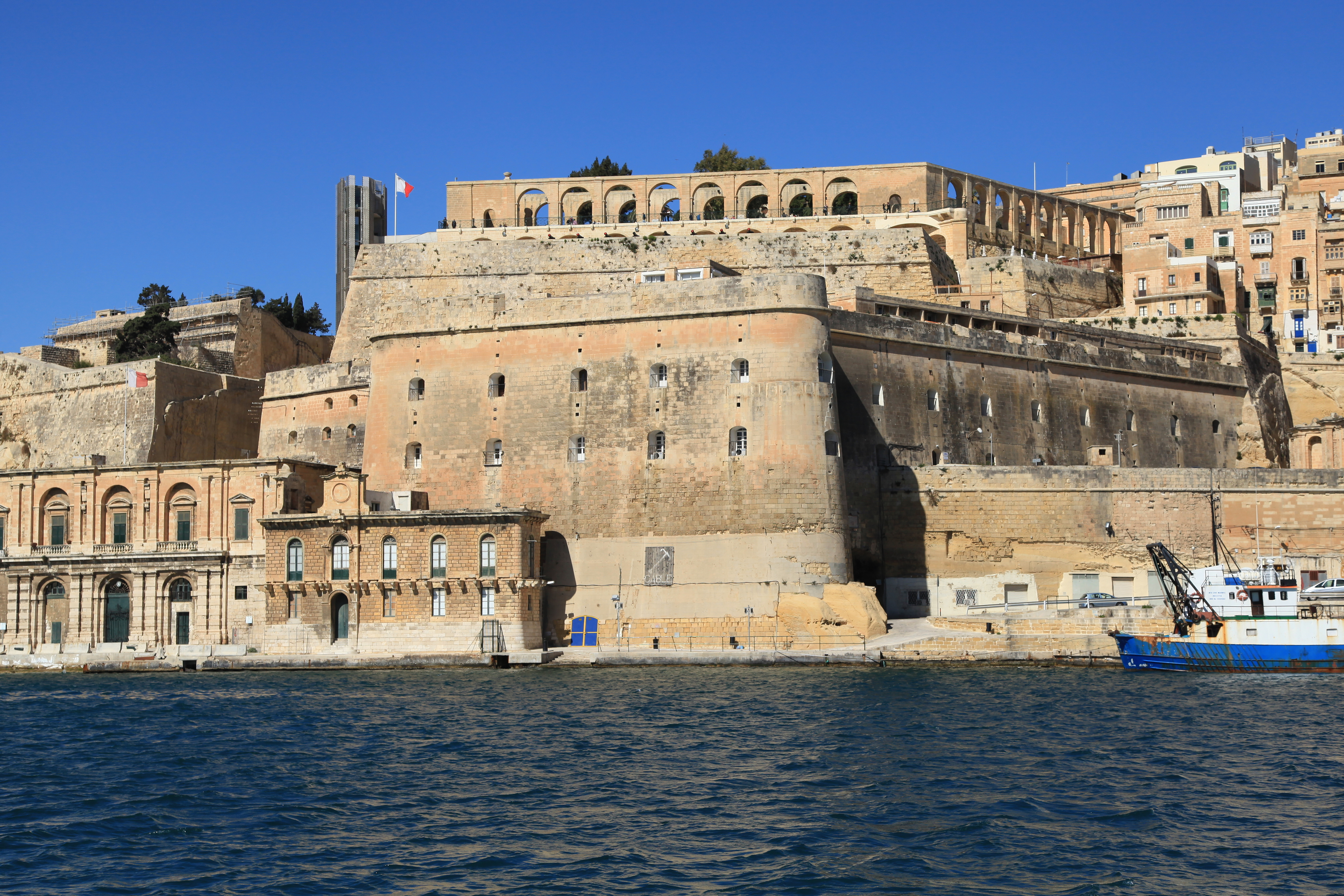
Xatt Lascaris
Valletta

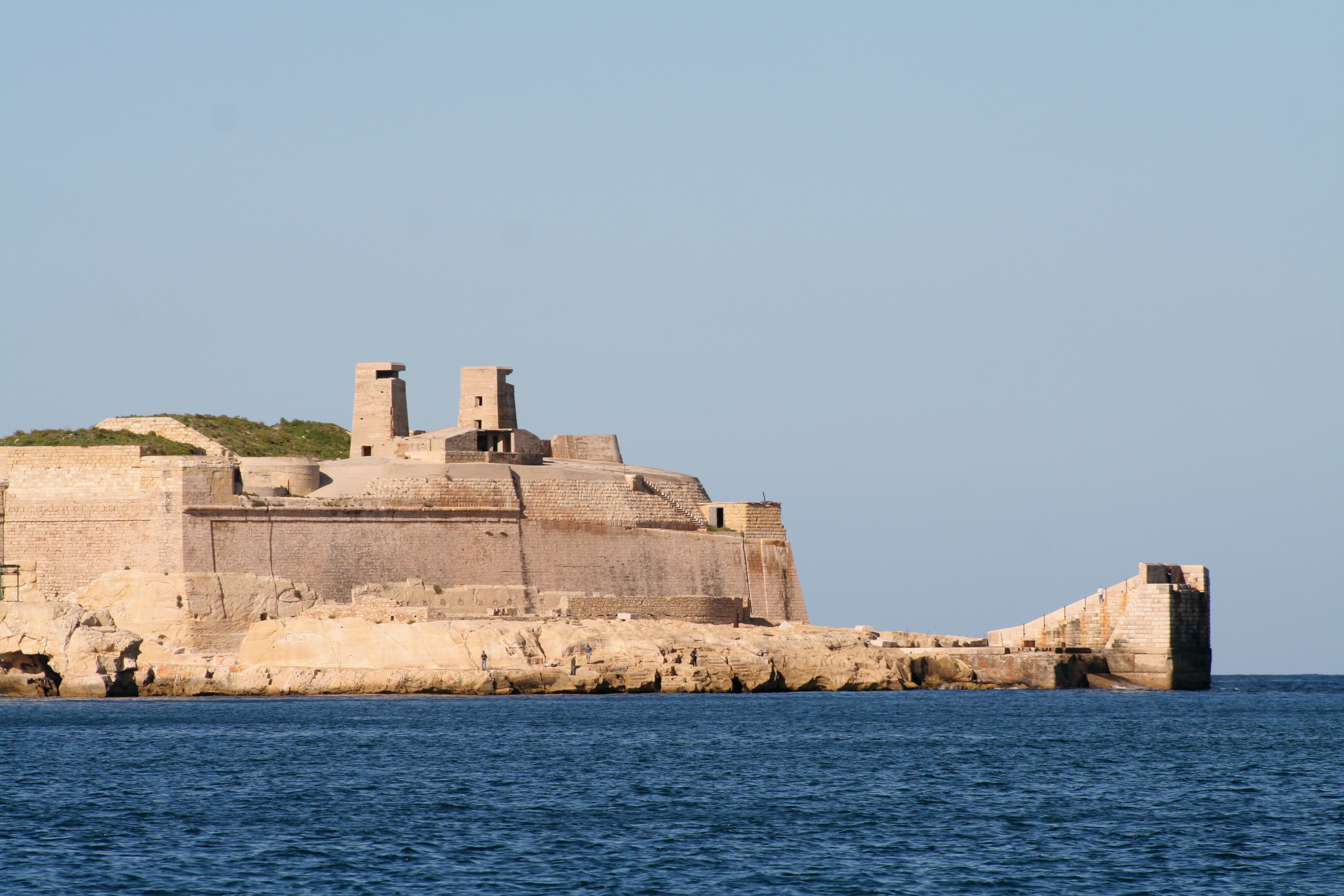
Fort Saint Elmo
Valletta

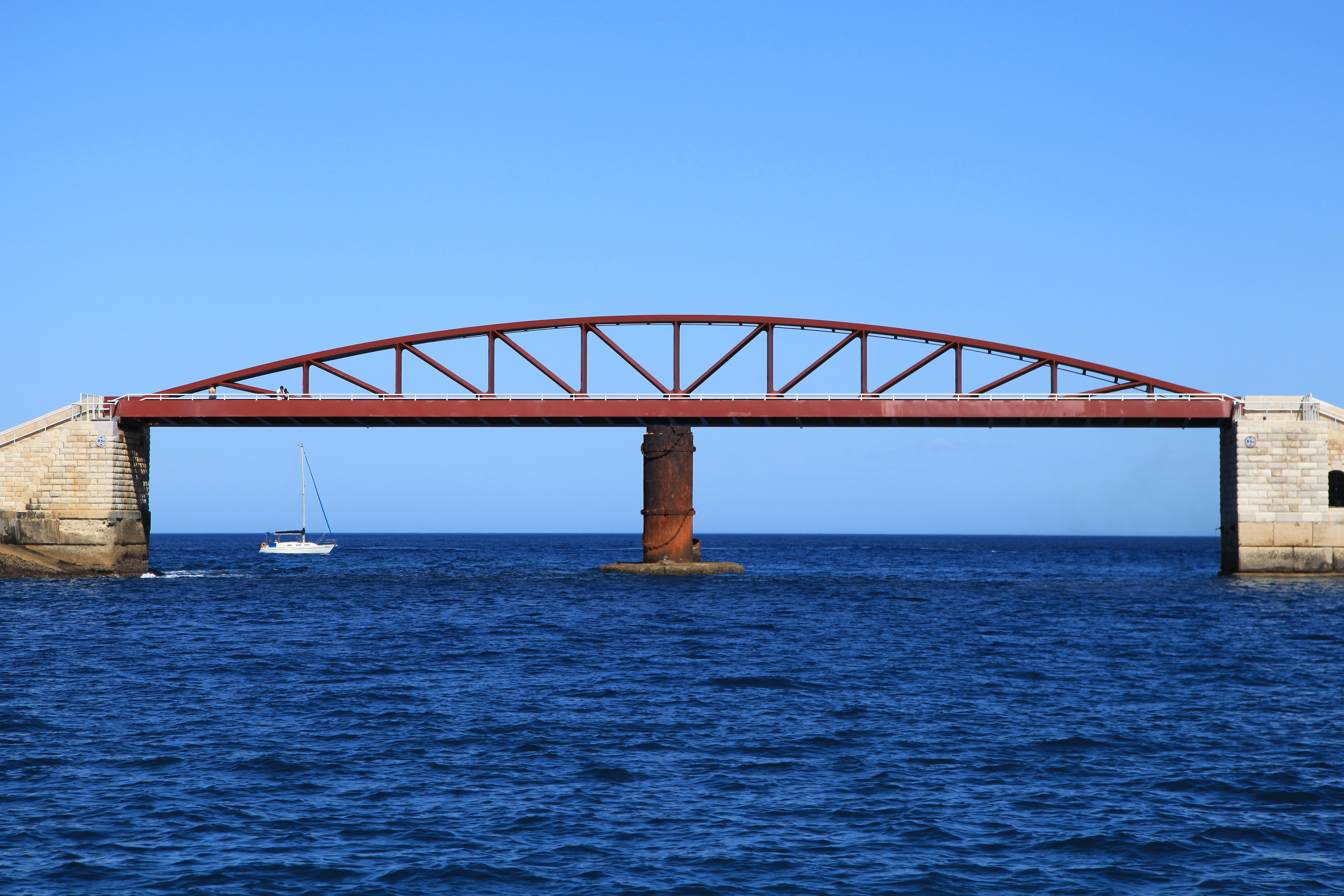
St. Elmo Bridge
Valletta

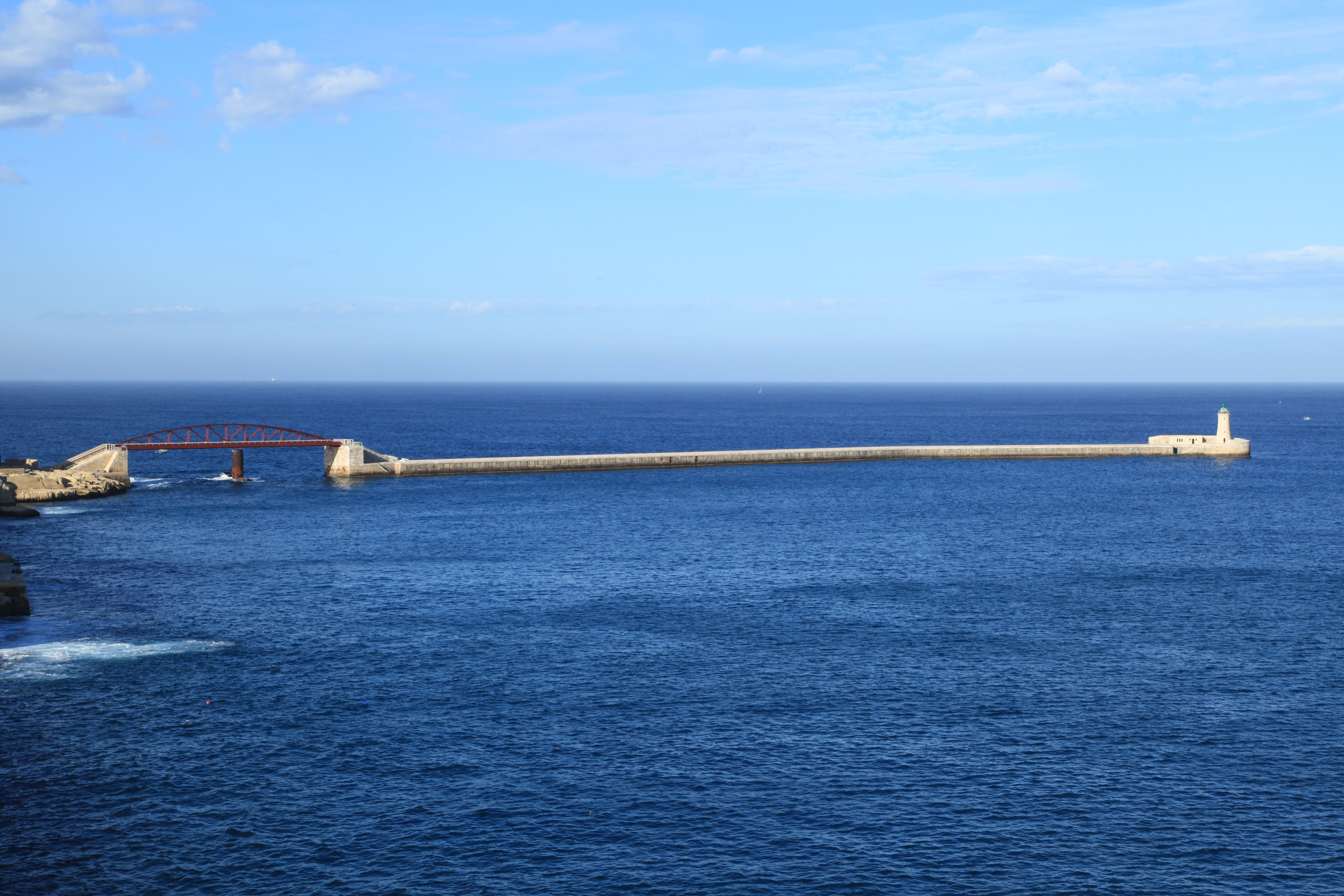
Valletta Breakwater
Valletta

== See also ==
- Malta Freeport
- Marsamxett Harbour
- Malta Dockyard
