= Transport in Malta =

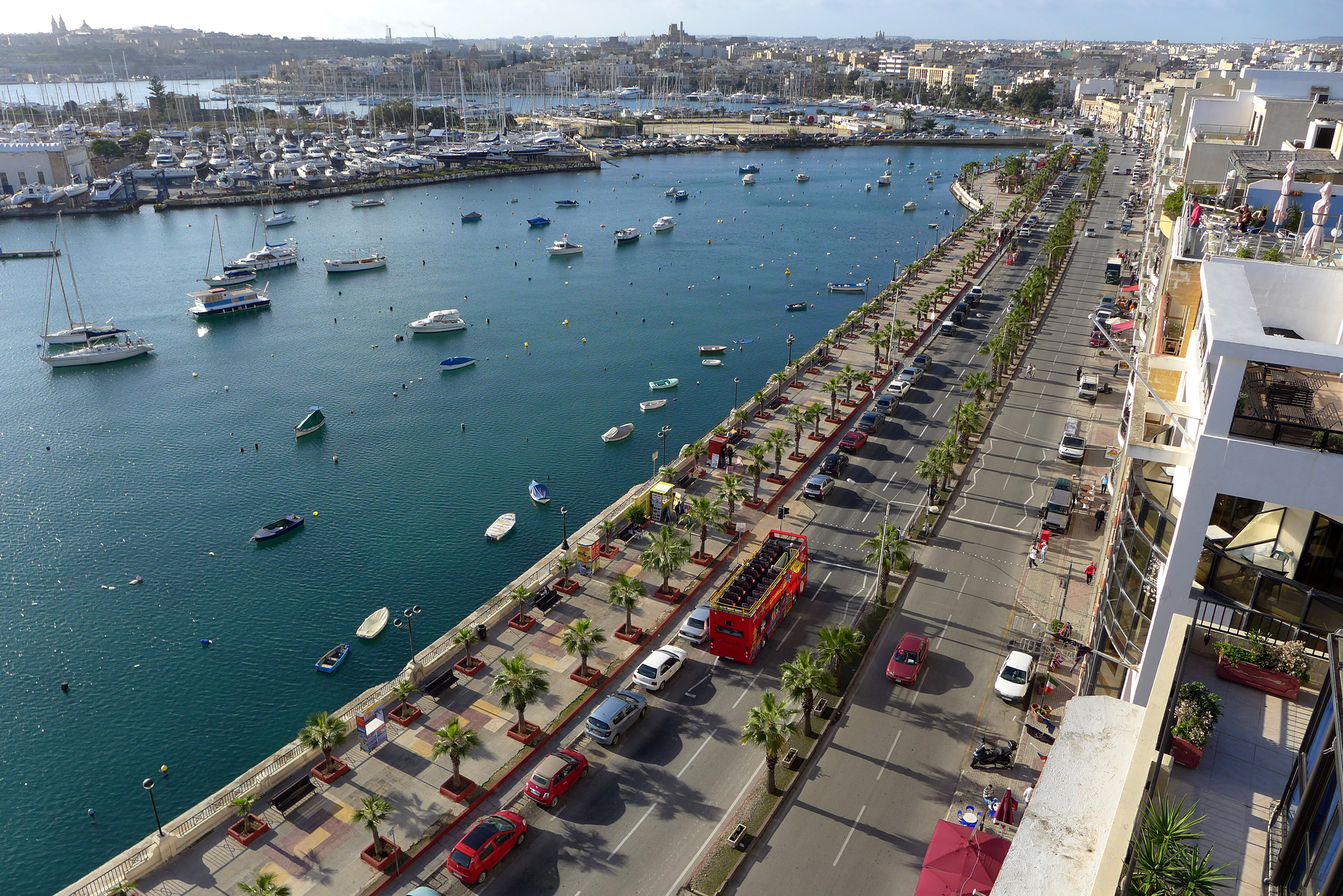
View of Gżira showing traffic on Triq ix-Xatt and boats in Marsamxett Harbour

The transport system in Malta is small but extensive, and the islands' domestic system of public transport is reliant on buses and taxis, although there was both a railway and a tramway in the past. Public transport in Malta has been free of charge since October 2022 for all residents with a Tallinja Card (a personalised public transport card), for which any resident of Malta can register.

Malta's primary international connections are the Malta International Airport in Luqa and by sea the Valletta Ferry Terminal. Malta's primary commercial connection is the Malta Freeport (the 3rd largest transshipment port in the Mediterranean Sea) in Birżebbuġa.

Created in 2010 the authority in charge of all Transport services in the country is Transport Malta, consumed the services of the Malta Maritime Authority, the Malta Transport Authority and the Director and Directorate of Civil Aviation.

The Ministry of Culture of Malta sanctioned Touring Club Malta to set up a Transport Museum.

== Earlier modes of transport ==
Before having its modern bus system and airport, Malta needed practical modes of transport.These were generally used by peasants who needed these for their everyday life. Today these transportations are still alive and are a symbol of Maltese culture and Folklore.

=== The karozzin ===
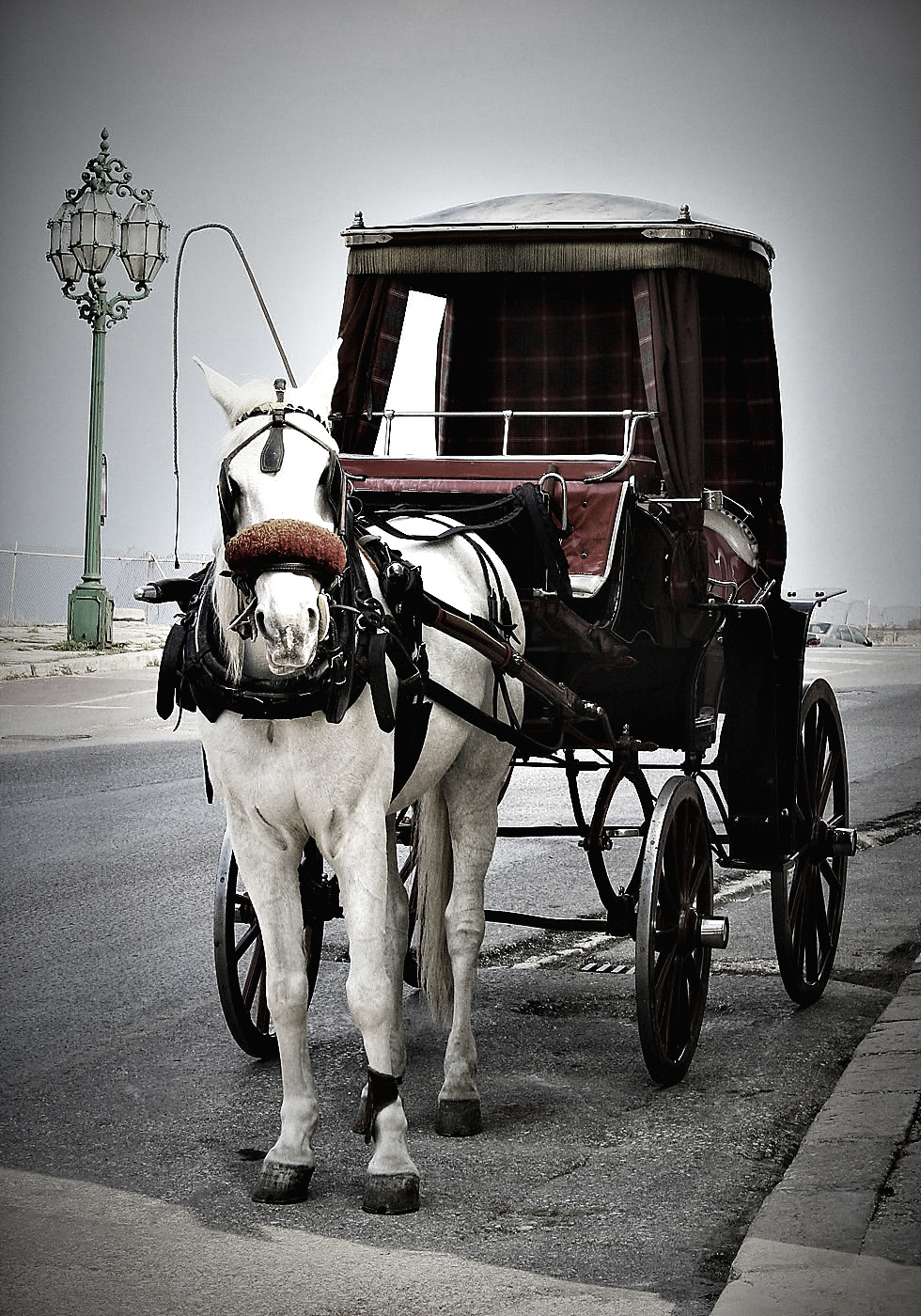
Maltese Karozzin

One of the most iconic modes of transport seen in the Maltese islands is the karozzin. It can carry up to 4 people and offers shelter with its roof. It has 4 large wooden wheels. Today we still find the karozzin in popular tourist cities like Mdina and Valletta.

=== The karettun ===
Like the karozzin, the karettun was pushed by a horse or a mule and had two large wheels. It was used to transport heavy loads around towns. Unlike the karozzin which continued to be used, the karettun is no longer used.

=== The Barrakka lift ===
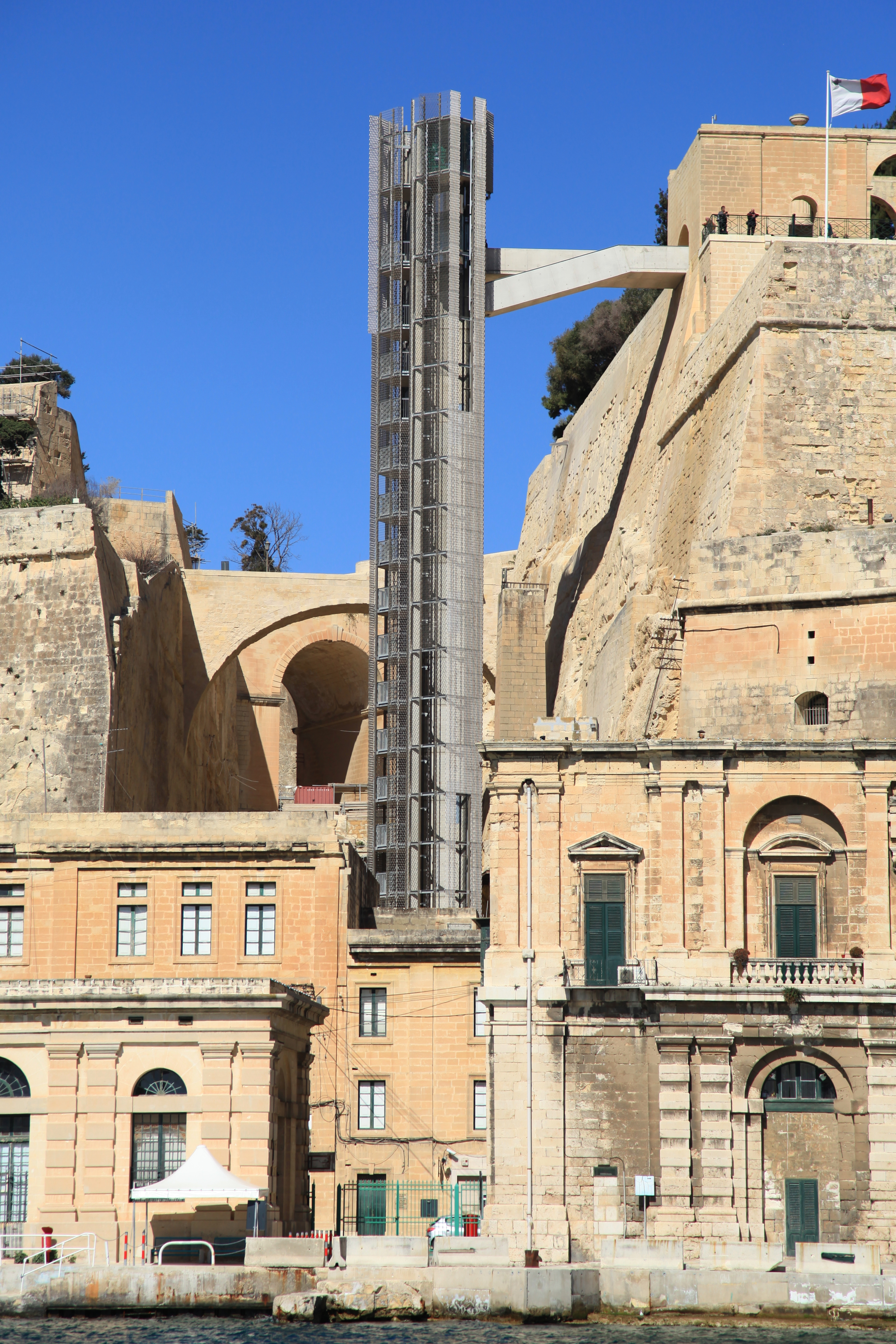
The Barrakka Lift

The first Barrakka Lift was constructed in 1905 by the English and decommissioned in 1973. It was demolished in 1983. Later on it was rebuilt and reopened in 2012. Today it stands as a unique experience and a necessity and as a landmark of the Grand Harbour.

== Land transport ==
=== Roads ===
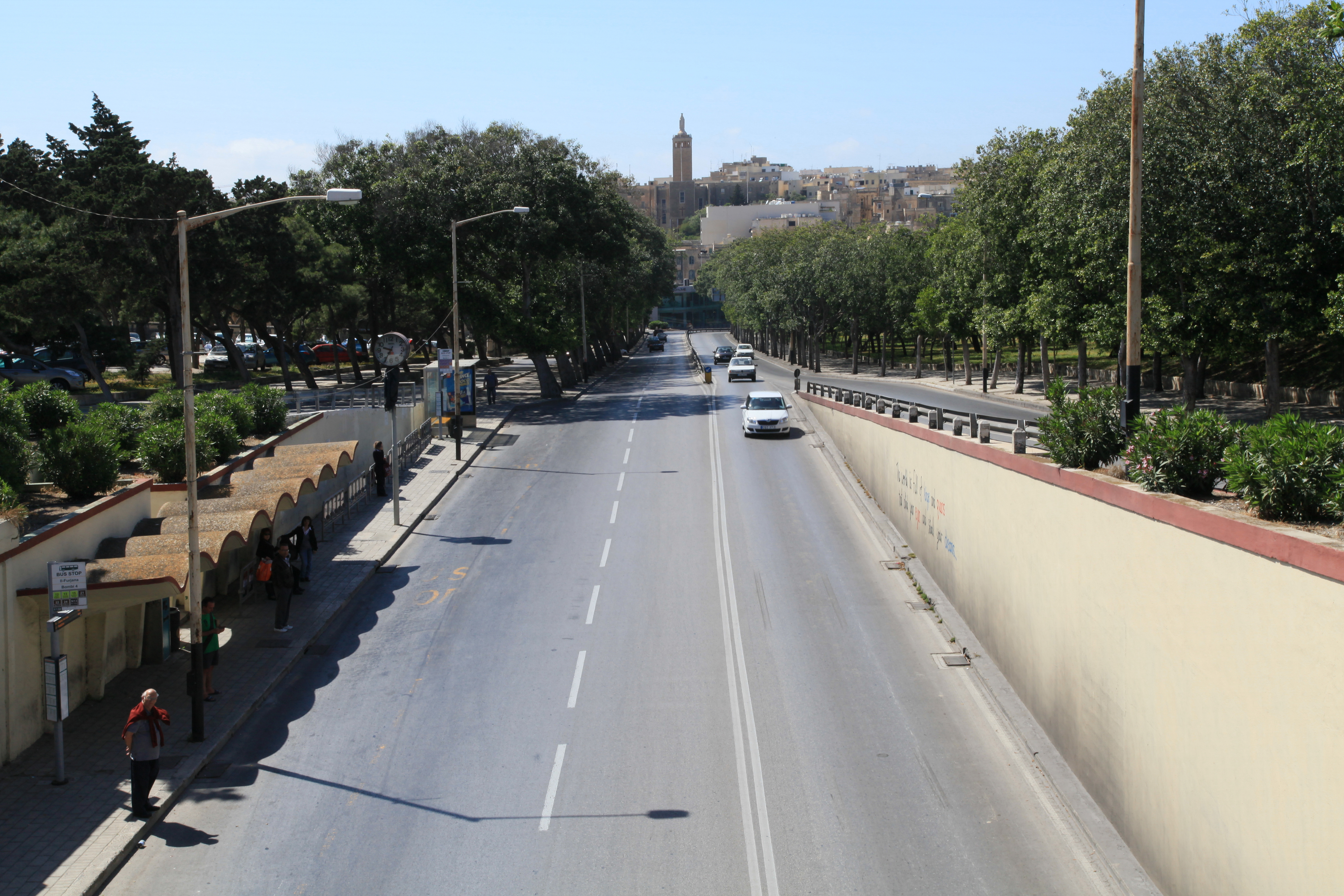
Triq l-Indipendenza in Ħamrun

Traffic in Malta drives on the left, being one of only four countries in Europe to do so, along with the United Kingdom, Ireland and Cyprus. Car ownership in Malta is exceedingly high given the very small size of the islands. The country has a car ownership rate of 766 motor vehicles per 1,000 people. As of October 2021, the number of registered cars amounted to 411,056, giving an auto-mobile density of 1253.8 per km².

Malta has 3,096 kilometres of road, 2,704 km (87.3%) of which are paved and 392 km are unpaved as of 2008. 114 km of Malta's roads are on the Trans-European Transport Network, but it has no motorways. Roads in Malta are maintained and operated by Infrastructure Malta.

The official road user guide for Malta is The Highway Code.

=== Buses ===
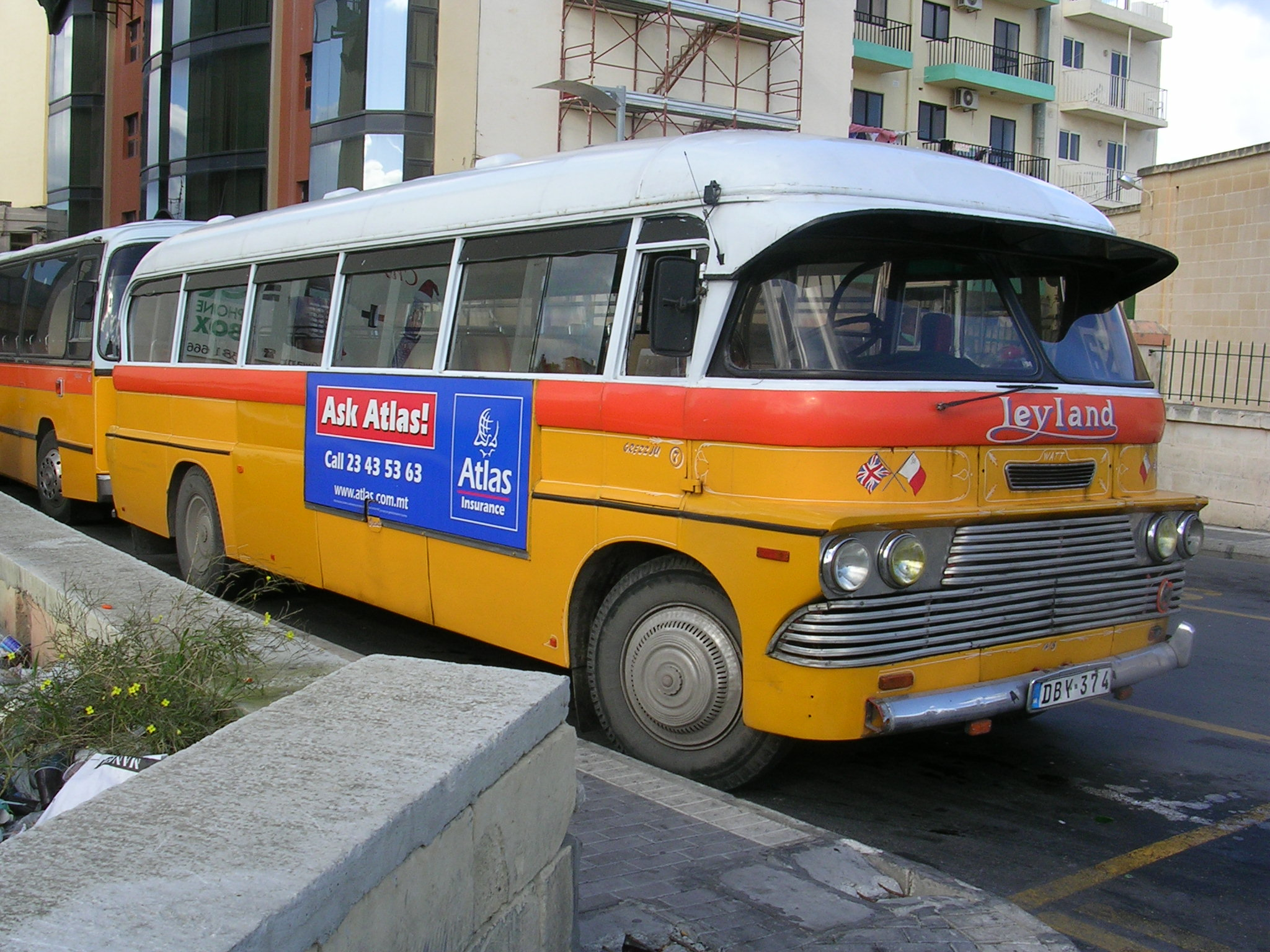
Traditional Maltese bus

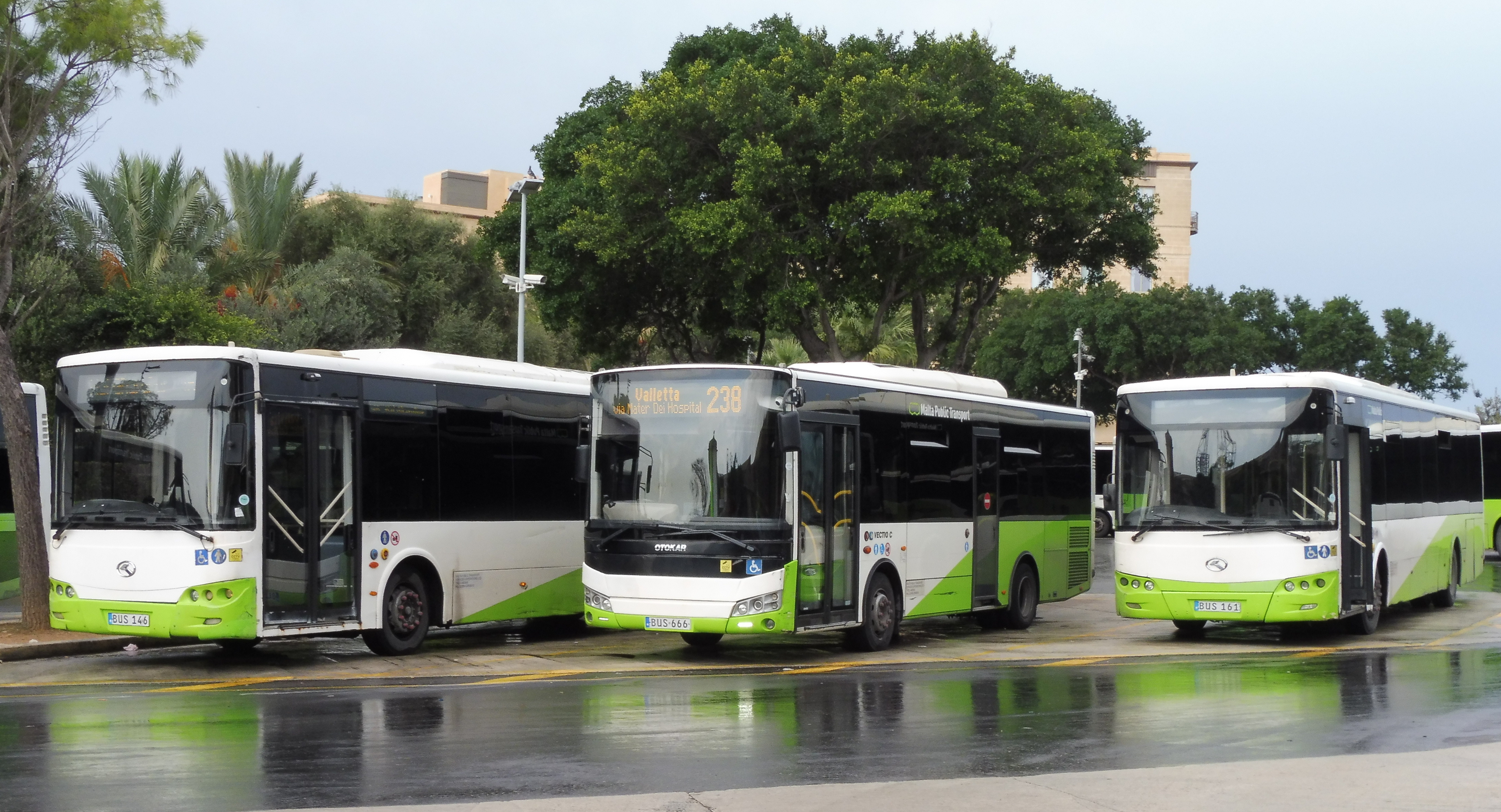
Modern buses at Valletta City Gate Bus Station

Buses are the primary method of public transport for the Maltese Islands and have been in operation there since 1905, offering a cheap and frequent service to many parts of Malta and Gozo. The vast majority of buses on Malta depart from a terminus in Valletta. Malta's buses carried over 40 million passengers in 2015.

The traditional classic Maltese buses, which were in operation until 2011 and still provide tourist-oriented services to this day, have become visitor attractions in their own right due to their uniqueness, and are depicted on many Maltese advertisements to promote tourism as well as on gifts and merchandise for tourists. Prior to their reform there were approximately 500 buses in public transit service, most of them privately owned by the bus drivers themselves, and operated to a unified timetable set by the transport authority. On any one day, half the bus fleet worked on the public transport network (called "route buses"), while the other half were used for private tours and school transport.

In July 2011 a new public transport network was installed by Transport Malta (the regulating authority) and on 3 July 2011 it started being operated by Arriva Malta, which was owned by Arriva (67%) and Tumas Group (33%), operating as the sole operator on a 10-year contract and running a new 264-strong fleet of buses in a turquoise and cream livery. Unlike the system it replaced, the buses were owned and operated by a single company with the drivers working as employees of Arriva Malta.

When Arriva ceased operations on 1 January 2014 due to financial difficulties, the company was nationalised as Malta Public Transport by the Maltese government as an interim measure while a new bus operator could be found. As of October 2014 the government has chosen Autobuses Urbanos de León (Alsa subsidiary) as its preferred bus operator for the country, and although the agreement has yet to be fully determined and signed, it is planned that they will be in operation in January 2015.

During the closing days of December 2014, the Times of Malta and other newspapers were reporting that the company had now signed contracts and purchased the existing operation for 8 million euros. They duly took over the business on January 8, 2015 with their takeover being effected as a "soft launch". The existing name - Malta Public Transport - is to be retained instead of using Autobuses Urbanos de León and nothing will have changed from a passenger perspective initially. The buses are to be repainted into a new livery of light green and white and during a press announcement to mark the formal takeover of operations on the day, several repainted buses were lined up for a photo call to show off the new livery, these being two of the leased in 2014 Optare Solos, one of the leased in 2014 Wright Volvos, one each of the new in 2011 King Long XMQ6900J and XMQ6127J buses. By February the sub contracted buses from UBS were replaced - temporarily - with 32 dual-door Mercedes-Benz Citaro buses operated by ALESA (as opposed to the situation until then of sub contracting of both bus and driver from UBS) until new Otokar Vectio C dual-door single deck buses currently on order have arrive later in 2015. These new buses will number 142 in total and used to augment the existing fleet as the revised route network is incrementally rolled out during the course of 2015 with the full service planned not expected to be fully realized until 2016, at which time the 23 million euro subsidy for 2015 will rise to 29 million thereafter.

In January 2019, the Government has said that young people who are between 16 and 20-years old in 2018 can now travel by bus for free. People between 17 and 19-years old will travel for free between 1 January 2019 and 31 December 2019. The government also said that those who will turn 16 this year will start travelling for free on their birthday and will keep benefiting from the scheme until their 17th birthday. 20-year-olds will benefit until they reach 21.

Since October 2022 public transport (which includes buses) in Malta and Gozo has been free of charge for all residents with a Tallinja Card (a personalised public transport card), of which any Malta resident can register for.

=== Railway ===
Old Malta Railway tracks (1883–1931)

The Malta Railway was the only railway line ever on the island of Malta, and it consisted of a single railway line from Valletta to Mdina. It was a single-track line in metre gauge, operating from 1883 to 1931 between the capital city of Valletta and the army barracks at Mtarfa / Mdina. The railway was known in Maltese as il-vapur tal-art (the land ship).

=== Tramways ===
Map of the Maltese tramways, 1905–1929

Electric tramways operated in Malta from 23 February 1905 till 1929.

The tramway was connected with two lines, considered to be a direct line:

1. Valletta – Marsa – Paola – Cospicua
2. Valletta – Ħamrun – Qormi – Żebbuġ
3. Valletta – Ħamrun – Birkirkara

There was no immediate extension of the track to Mosta.

The tracks ran on the road parallel to the Valletta-Mdina railway line, which also allowed the traffic system to be used by cars and buses. The road operation was terminated after the bankruptcy of the company on December 15, 1929 and the infrastructure was rebuilt.

In 2008, the Halcrow report suggested the government to reintroduce two tram lines in Malta: Valletta to Sliema along the coast road, and Valletta to Ta' Qali. The report was largely overlooked, as the government focused on reforming the bus transport. In 2016 the government announced a new study on reintroducing the tram. The new study, which is expected by late 2020, should also look at metro and monorail options.

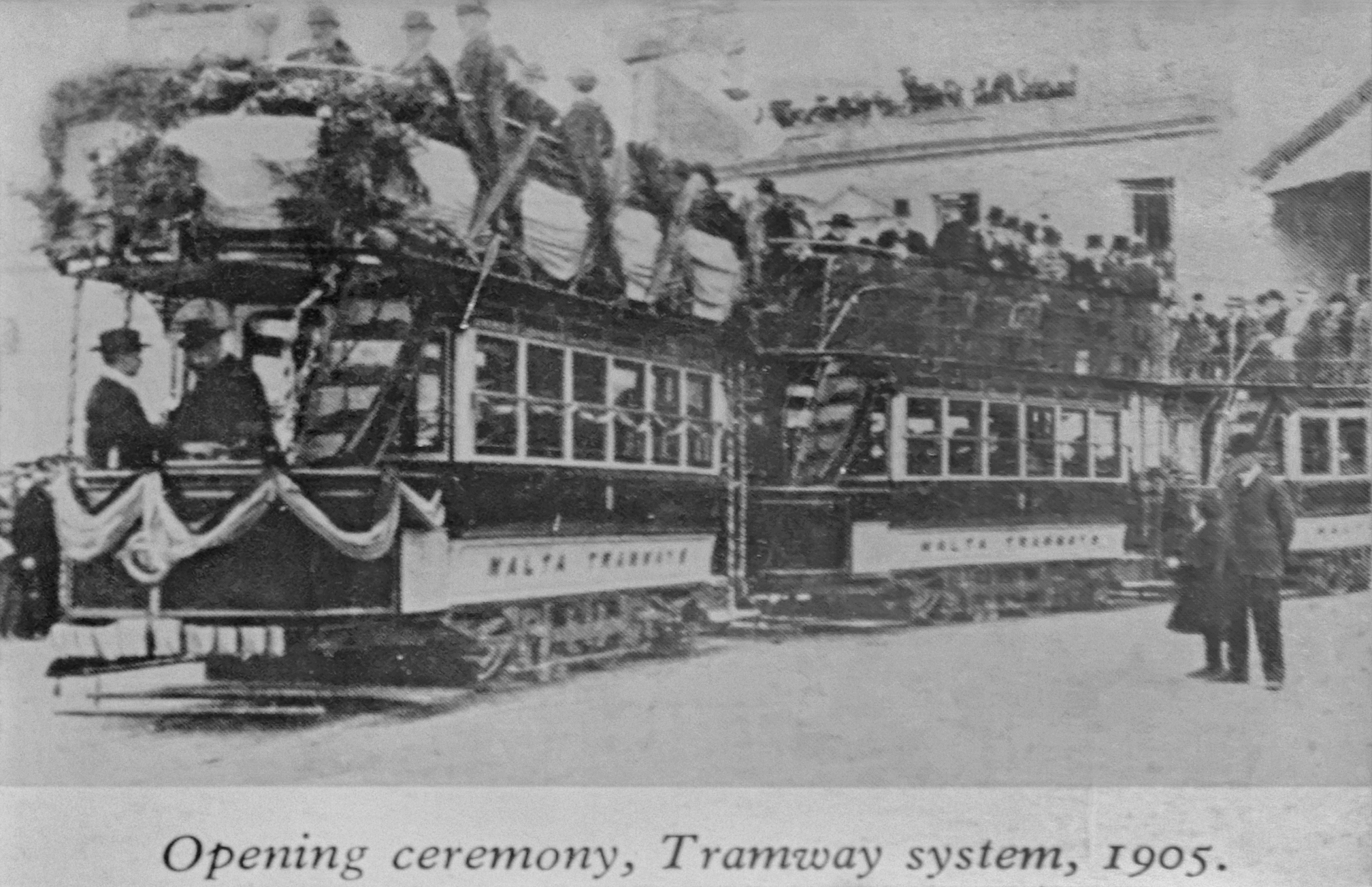
Inauguration, 1905

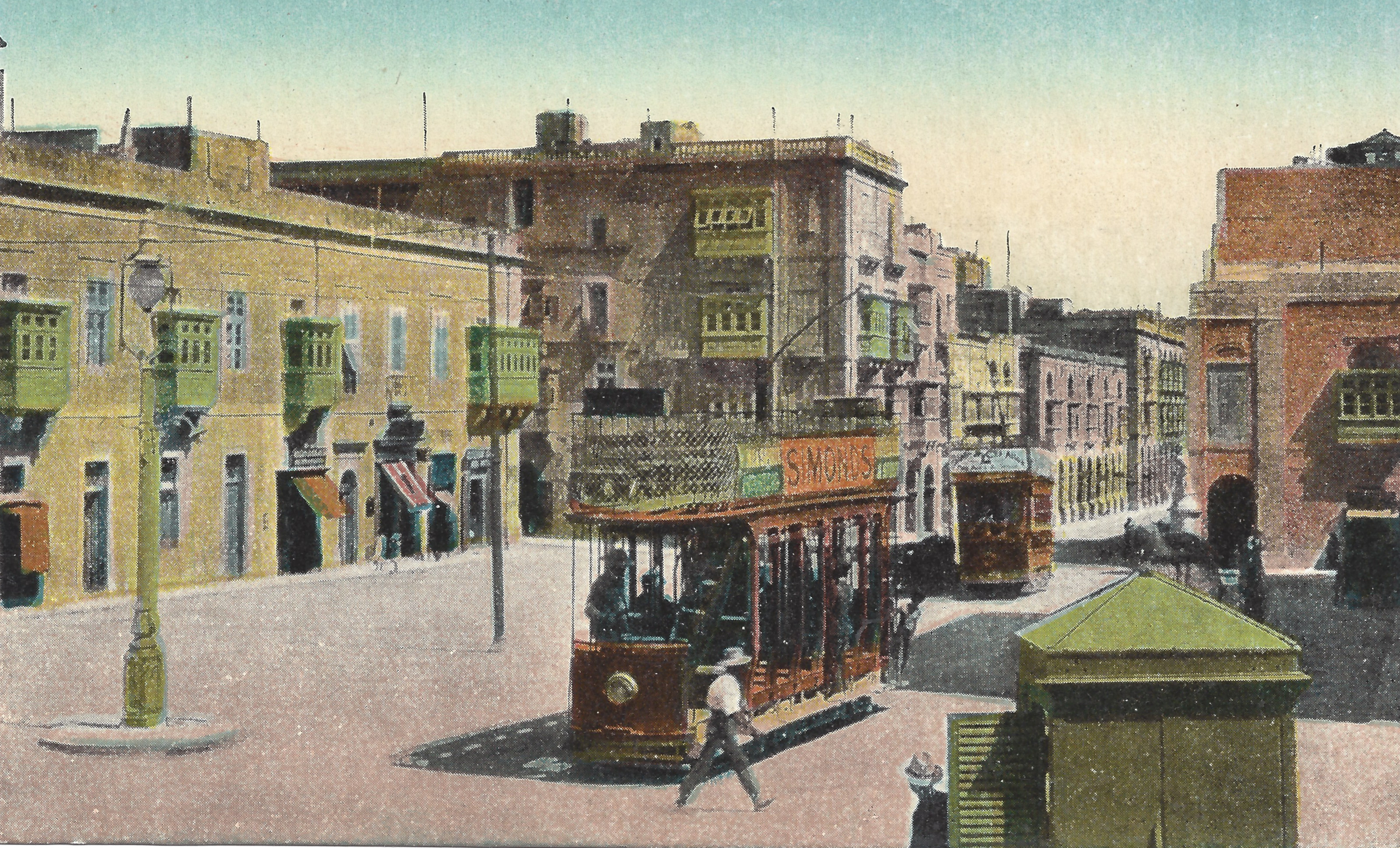
Tramway in Floriana, Valletta in 1929

=== Metro ===
In 2021 the Maltese government unveiled a proposal for a €6.2 billion metro network, to consist of three lines and 25 stations, of which the majority would be underground. As of 2023, the project seems to have been shelved.

== Maritime transport ==
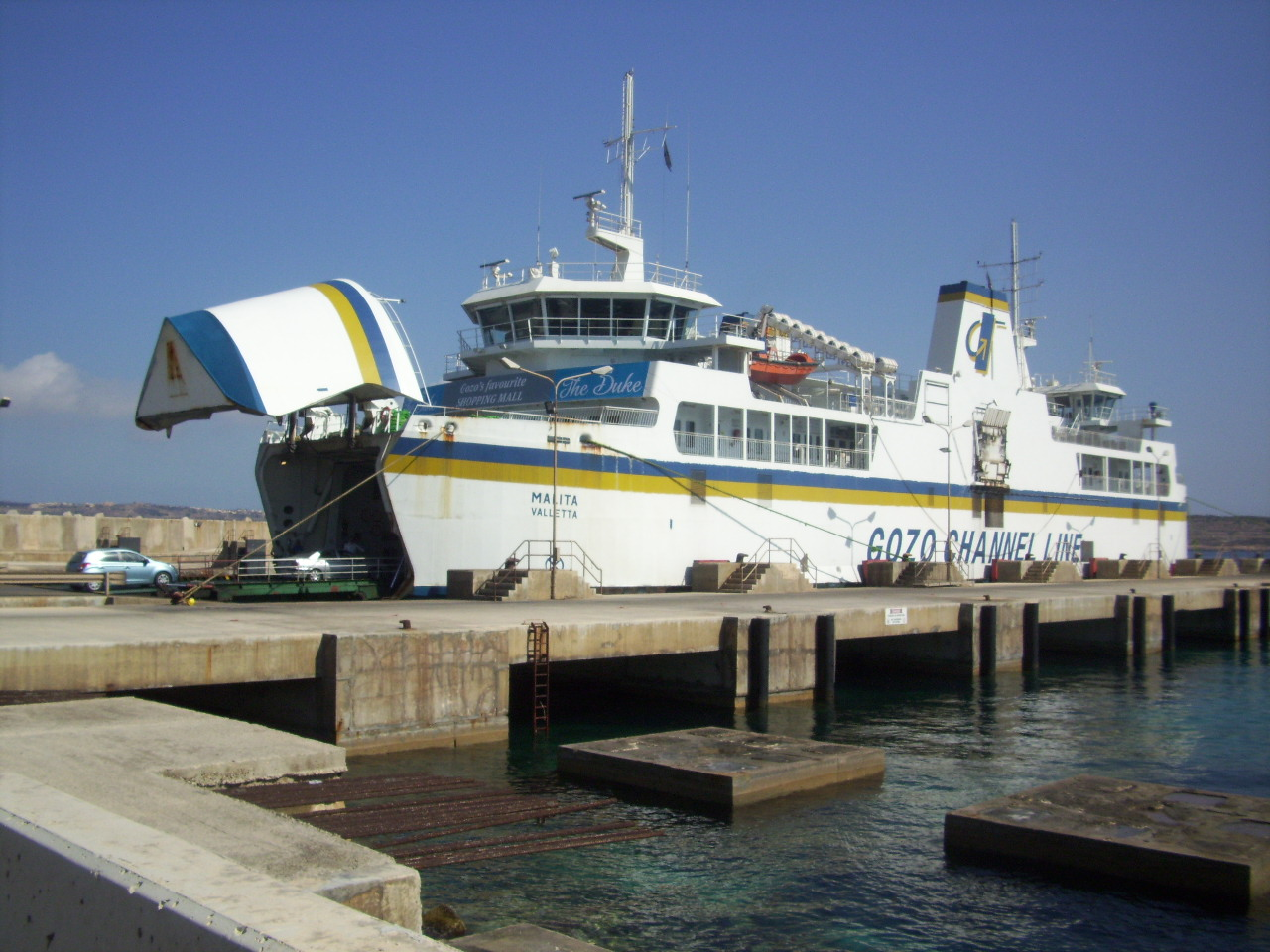
The Gozo ferry MV Malita departs Ċirkewwa

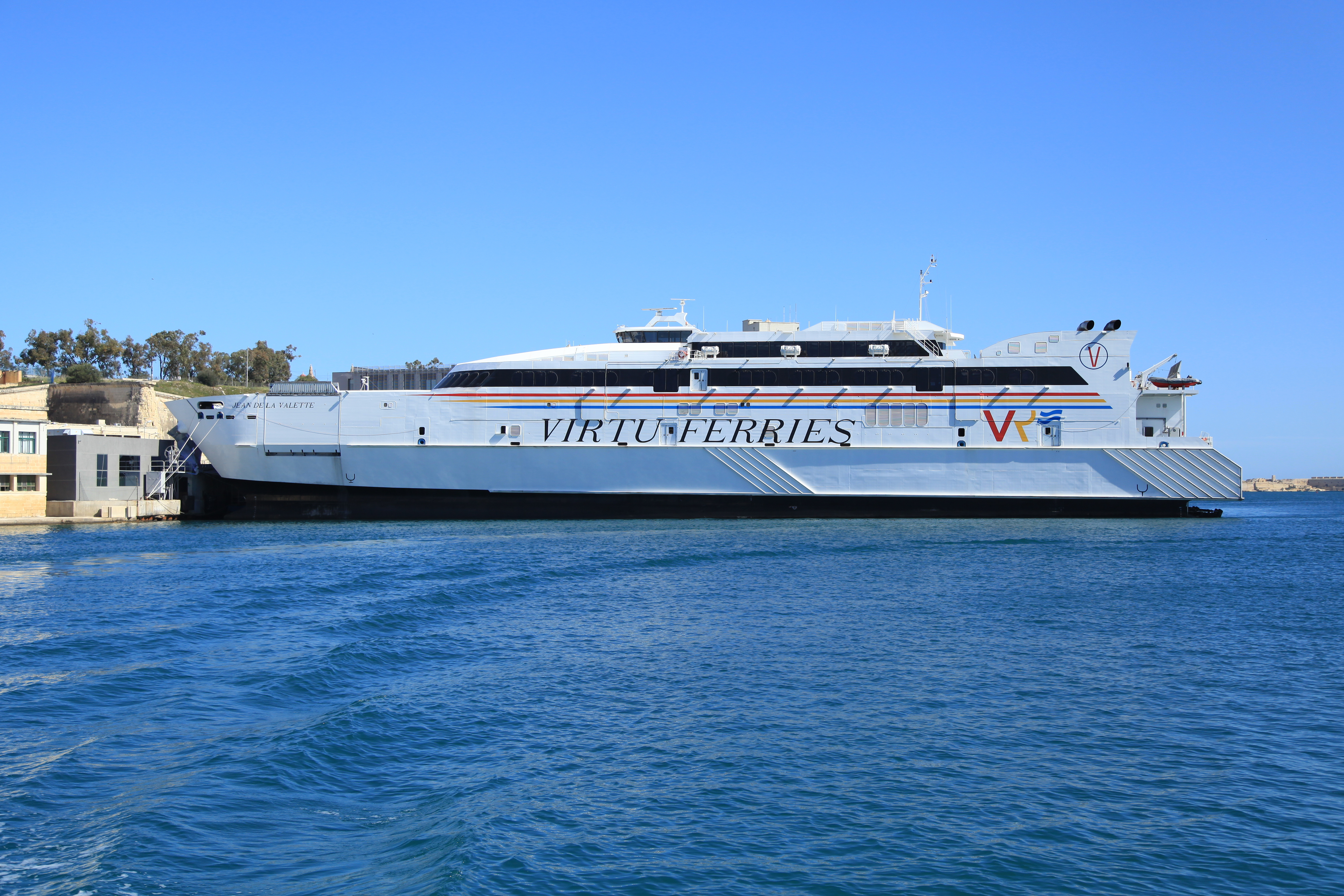
The Malta-Sicily ferry MV Jean De La Valette at the Grand Harbour

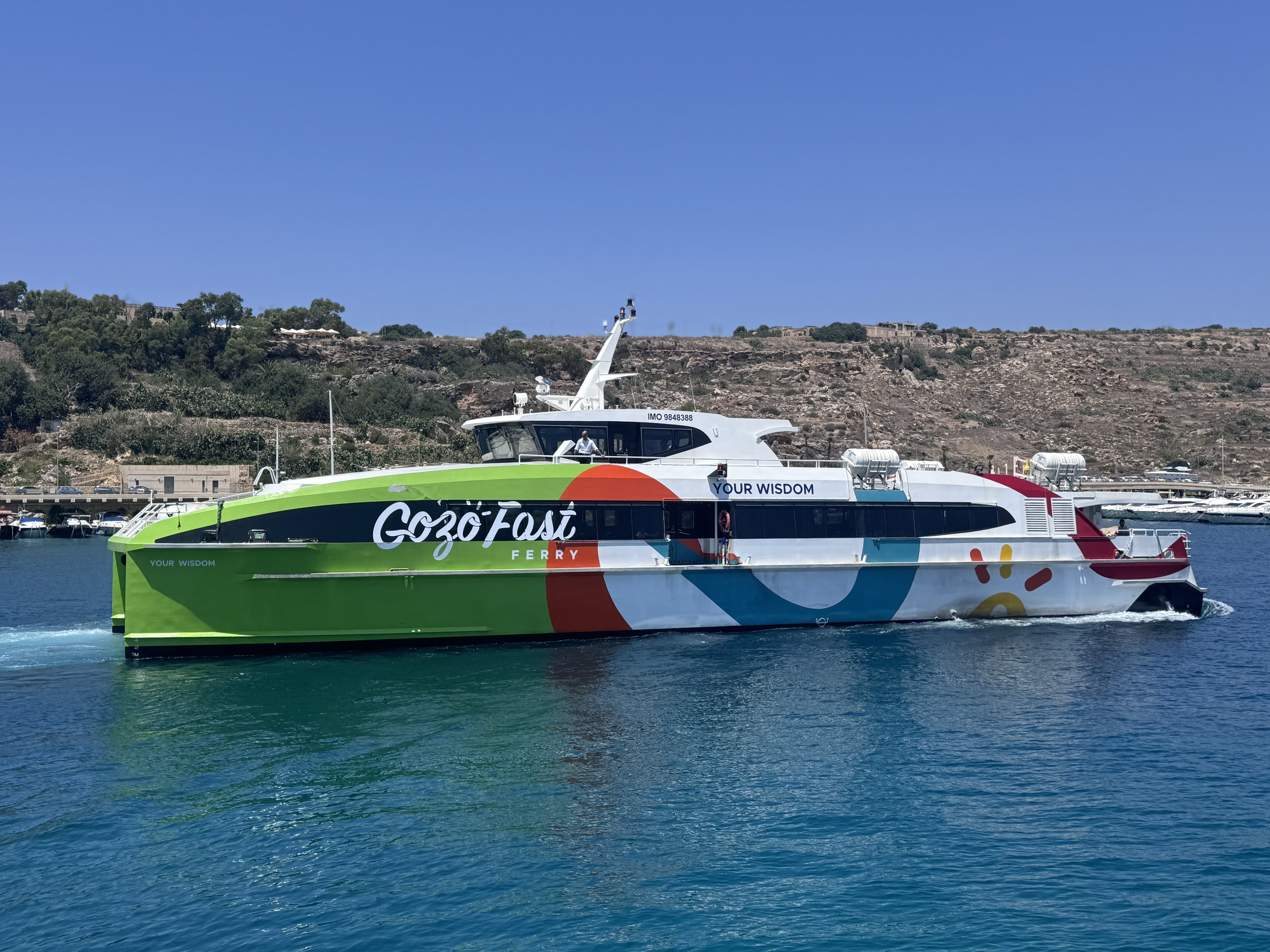
Fast ferry MV Your Wisdom departing Mgarr

Malta has three large natural harbours on its main island. There are also two man-made harbours that connect the islands of Malta and Gozo.

- The Grand Harbour, located at the eastern side of the capital city of Valletta. The Grand Harbour, which has been used as a harbour since Roman times, has several extensive docks and wharves, as well as a cruise liner terminal.
- Marsamxett Harbour, located on the western side of Valletta, accommodates a number of yacht marinas.
- Marsaxlokk Harbour is sited at Marsaxlokk on the southeastern side of Malta, and is the location of the Malta Freeport, the islands' main cargo terminal.

=== Ferry services ===
A frequent daily passenger and car ferry service runs between the islands of Malta and Gozo between Ċirkewwa Harbour and Mġarr Harbour.

There are also regularly scheduled local commuter ferries, including:

- From Marsamxett (Valletta) to Sliema,
- From Ta' Liesse (Valletta) to Cottonera,
- From Ta' Liesse (Valletta) to Mġarr, Gozo (Gozo Highspeed, formerly "Gozo Fast Ferry").

More ferries are planned to be introduced starting in Summer 2025.

There is also a ferry terminal at the Grand Harbour that connects Malta to Pozzallo and Catania in Sicily.

=== Merchant marine ===
Malta is one of the ten largest ship registers in the world (6th in 2016) and the largest in the EU, with 66.2 million gt registered. At the end of 2015, there were also 501 yachts on the register.

== Air transport ==
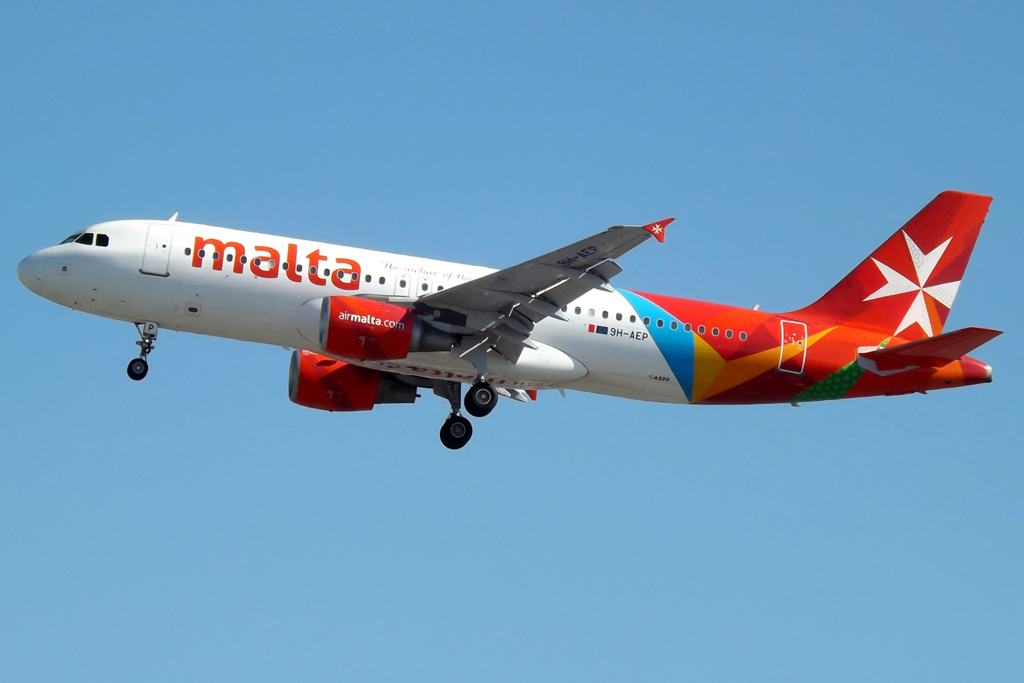
An Air Malta Airbus A320

Malta International Airport is the only airport serving the Maltese Islands. It is built on land formerly occupied by the RAF Luqa air base. A heliport is also located there, but the scheduled service to Gozo ceased in 2006. From June 2007 to August 2012, a three-times-daily floatplane service, operated by HarbourAir Malta, linked the sea terminal in Grand Harbour to Mgarr harbour in Gozo.

In the past there were two further airfields that were in operation during World War II and into the 1960s, located at Ta'Qali and Ħal Far. They have since been closed; the land at the former has been converted into a national park, the stadium, and the Crafts Village visitor attraction. The Malta Aviation Museum is also situated there, preserving several aircraft including Hurricane and Spitfire fighters that defended the island in World War II. Ħal Far has been converted into an industrial estate, a race track, and an immigration reception centre.

The national airline is KM Malta Airlines, which replaced Air Malta in March 2024.

== See also ==
- Buses in Malta
- Plug-in electric vehicles in Malta

== Notes ==
- Bonnici Calì, Rafel (June 1978). "Folklor fuq il-Karozzi tan-Nar" (PDF). L-Imnara (in Maltese). 1 (1). Rivista tal-Għaqda Maltija tal-Folklor: 13–17. Archived from the original on April 17, 2016.
- Ganado, Albert (2005). "Bibliographical notes on Melitensia - 3". Journal of the Malta Historical Society. 14 (2). Melita Historica: 173–174, see footnote 8. Archived from the original on 21 April 2014.
