= Malta Metro =

Proposed metro system in Malta

Overview
- Locale: Malta
- Transit type: Rapid transit
- Number of lines: 1 (planned)

Technical
- System length: 24 km (14.9 mi)

The Mediterranean island of Malta has not had an operational railway since the Malta Railway closed in 1931. Subsequent governments have investigated mass transit options to alleviate Malta's high reliance on private vehicles and ongoing traffic congestion.

In December 2016, Transport Malta commissioned the international engineering firm Arup to develop a study on a mass rapid transit system for Malta. The study identified various mass rapid transit options, and a light rail underground system covering the principal urban area around Valletta was selected as a preferred option.

A €6.2 billion underground metro network was proposed in 2021, followed by a revised light rail transit system announced in 2026 as part of the national transport strategy. The project is still in the planning and study stages, and no rail system has yet been built.

== Background ==
Malta does not currently have any railways, and car ownership in Malta is exceedingly high, considering the tiny size of the islands; it is the fourth-highest in the European Union. The number of registered cars in 1990 amounted to 182,254, giving an automobile density of 577/km^{2} (1,494/sq mi).

Plans for a form of mass transit for the island of Malta were under discussion as early as 2016, with then-Minister of Transport Joe Mizzi announcing that €1.9 million of funding from the European Union had been provided to Malta to finance urban mobility plans in Valletta.

== Proposed Network ==
In 2021 Transport Malta unveiled a proposal for a 35 km (22 mile) €6.2 billion metro network, to consist of three lines and 25 stations, of which the majority would be underground. The lines would be centred on the principal urban area around Valletta, and the entire project was estimated to take between 15 and 20 years to complete. By 2025 the plans were shelved. The subterranean metro was "the best possible solution," according to Transport Minister Chris Bonett, but its cost had quickly increased from earlier estimates to almost €6 billion, making it "unaffordable." However, critics argue that the government lost five years since the project costs were known since 2021.

The government unveiled an updated rail-based plan in April 2026 as part of a larger 15-year National Integrated Transport Plan called Malta in Motion, linking to Malta's Vision 2050, the 2050 National Transport Strategy, and the 2030 National Transport Master Plan. Rather than being a metro, the central rail component is officially referred to as a rapid transit system. The updated design integrates rail with buses, ferries, cycling, and walking infrastructure while emphasising cost reduction and gradual implementation.

The core of the 2026 proposal is a single 24-kilometre light rail / rapid transit line, known as the La Valette Line, between St. Paul’s Bay and the Malta International Airport, with stops at the Mater Dei Hospital, the University of Malta, Valletta, and Qormi. The plans were developed by international consultancy firm ARUP, alongside Maltese design firm Mizzi Studios, envisage that parts of the line will run underground and other parts at street level or elevated, depending on the area’s topography and built density. Stations will be designed to serve as interchange nodes, connected to ferry services, bus terminals, and park-and-ride establishments.

The initial technical studies are expected to last until the end of 2027. The construction of the first phase covering the tract between the airport and Valletta is planned to start in 2031 so as to commence operations by 2036, with construction of the whole line expected to be completed by 2041. The estimated cost, including contingencies, is €2.8 billion, with €160 million going to design, planning, and engineering works and €1.8 billion going to construction costs.

Recent traffic studies show that junctions leading into Sliema are expected to fail by 2033. The current bus network carries over 250,000 passengers per day and has been described as operating close to its practical limits. Although studies into mass transit options have been ongoing since 2016, the scale and complexity of the project mean that implementation is expected to be gradual, with services along the airport–Valletta corridor projected to commence only by 2036. Authorities propose further improvements to the existing bus network and expansion of the sea fast ferry routes. The Nationalist Party and the ADPD criticised the proposals as vague and excessively long‑term calling for greater transparency and clarity, raising concerns about route alignment, passenger capacity, financing mechanisms and environmental impacts and the need for more immediate solutions, such as a bus rapid transit.

== See also ==
- Transport in Malta
