= Malta Tramways =

Map of the Maltese tranways, 1905-1929

The Malta Tramways Ltd. company operated electric tramways in Malta from 23 February 1905 till 1929. A legal trailer was founded in 1903 by the Society. It was handled by a meter-wide track. Drive along the Bilevel rail car, the side and on top of the Oberdeck open.

The tramway was connected with two lines, considered to be a direct line:

1. Valletta – Marsa – Paola – Cospicua
2. Valletta – Ħamrun – Qormi – Żebbuġ
3. Valletta – Ħamrun – Birkirkara

There was no immediate extension of the track to Mosta.

The tracks ran on the road parallel to the Valletta-Mdina railway line, which allowed the traffic system to be used by cars and buses in the ruin. The road operation was terminated after the bankruptcy of the company on December 15, 1929 and the infrastructure was rebuilt.

In 2008, the Halcrow report suggested the government reintroduce two tram lines in Malta: Valletta to Sliema along the coast road, and Valletta to Ta' Qali. The report was largely overlooked, as the government focused on reforming the bus transport. In 2016 the government announced a new study on reintroducing the tram. The new study, which is expected by late 2020, should also look at metro and monorail options.

In 2026, new plans will likely be presented for the proposal of a light rail system, connecting the harbour area with the towns more inland. This plan substitutes the earlier presented Malta Metro plan.

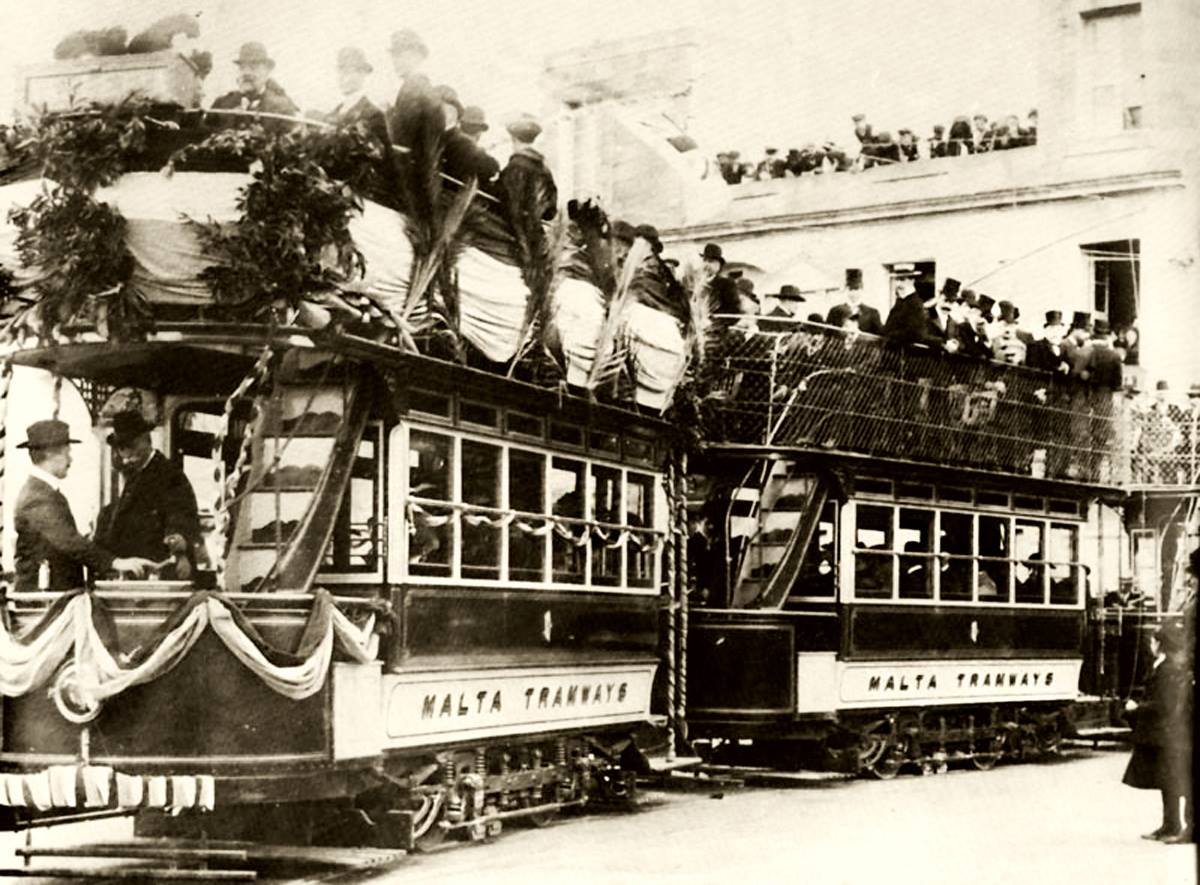
Inauguration, 1905

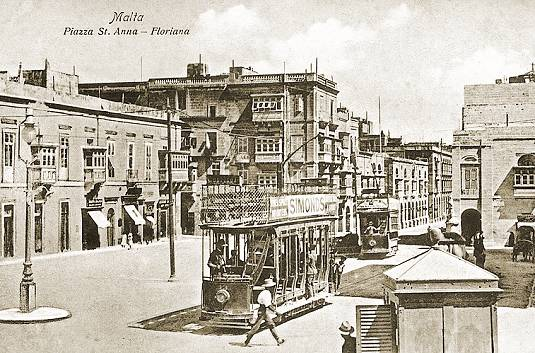
Car 13 in Piazza St Anna, Floriana ca 1910

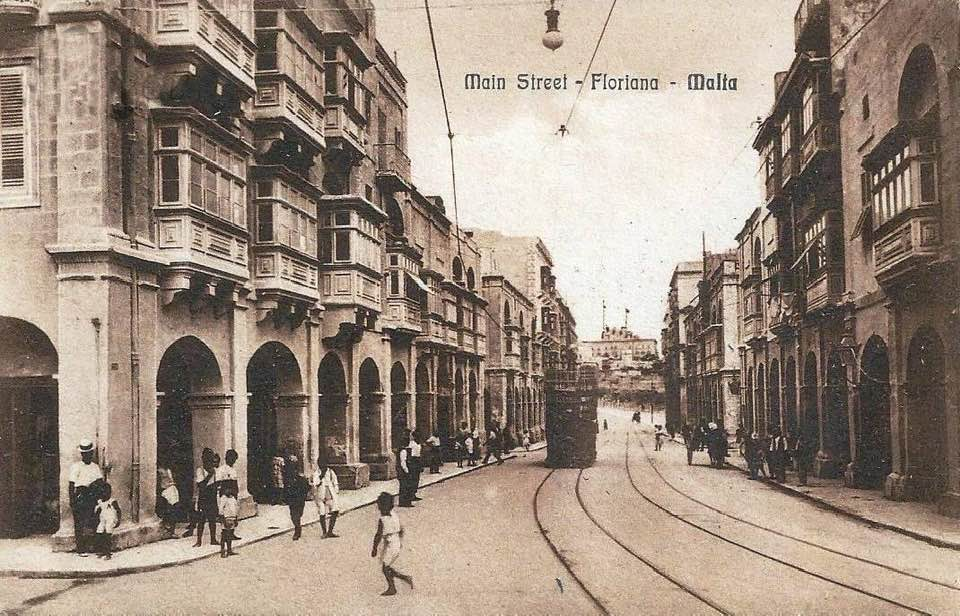
St Anne Street, Floriana ca 1910

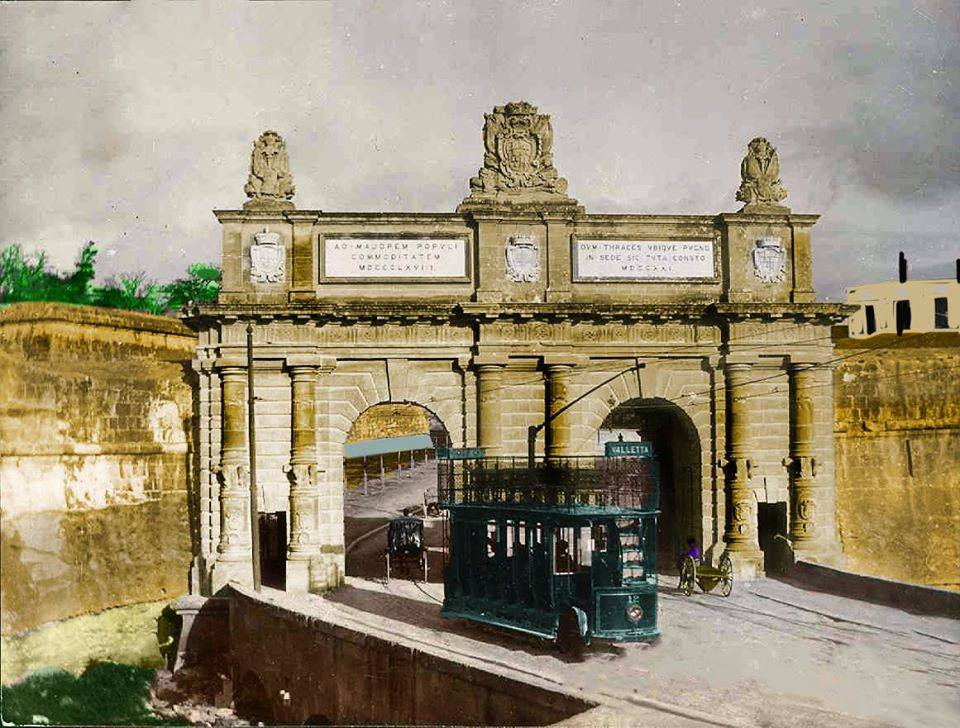
Tram car 12 heading for Valletta and about to pass through 'Porte des Bombes' in Floriana, circa 1910

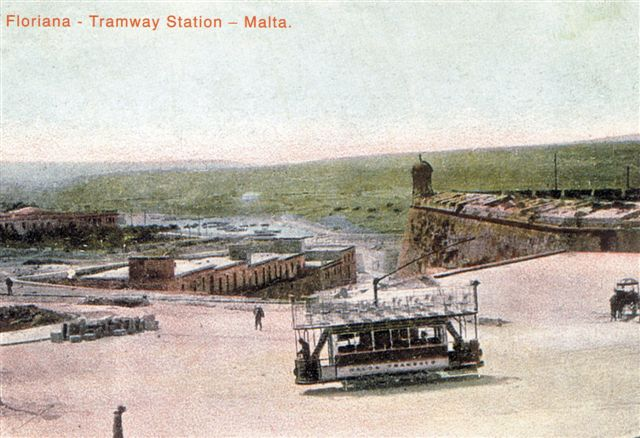
Floriana Tramway Station

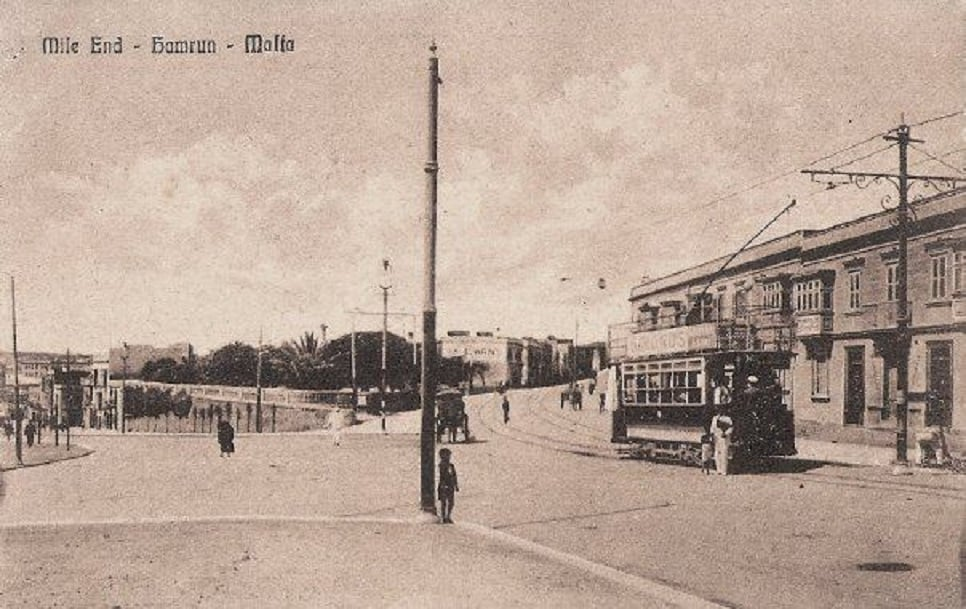
Mile End, Hamrun

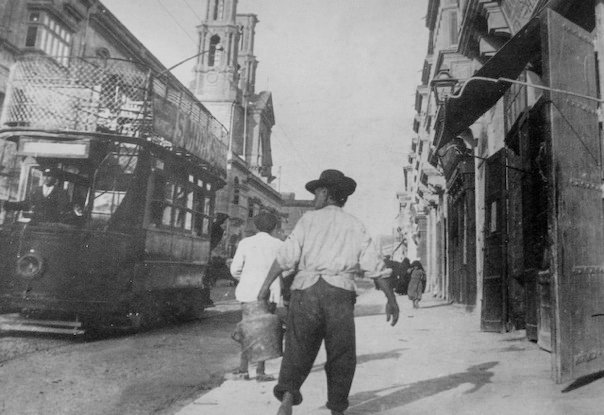
Tramway in Hamrun, Malta

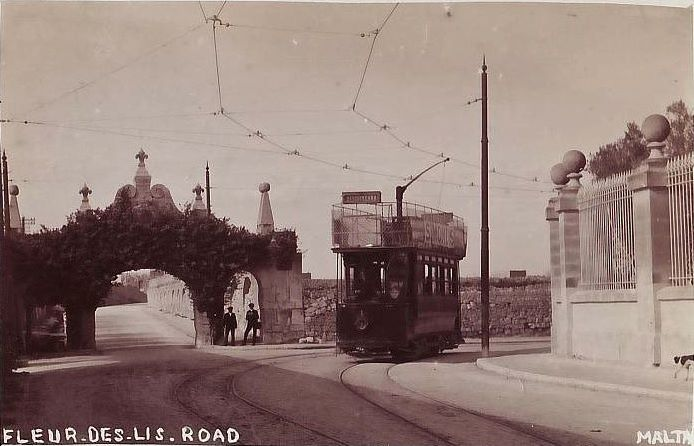
Tramway at Fleur-de-Lys

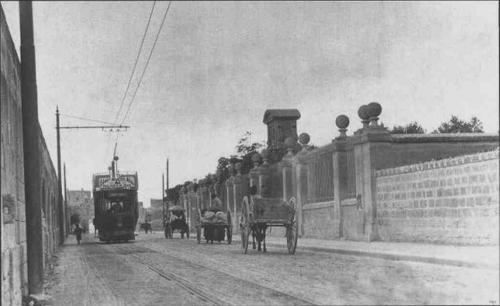
Tram on its way from Birkirkara to Valletta

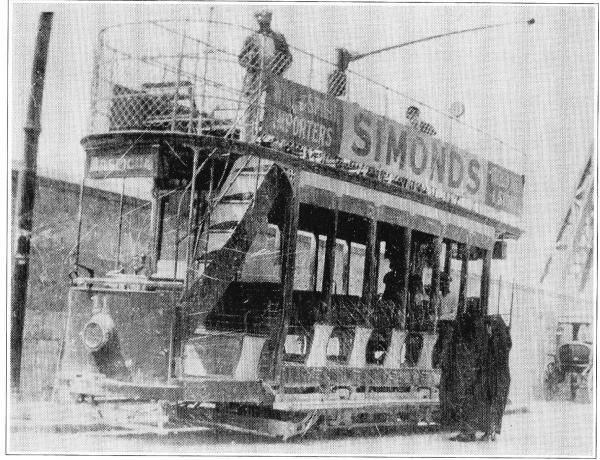
Car 11, 1905

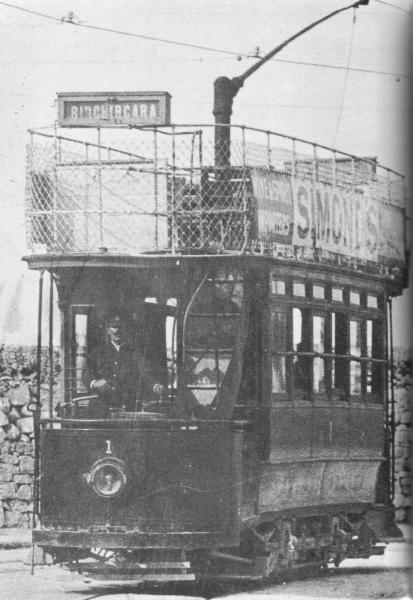
Car 1, 1905

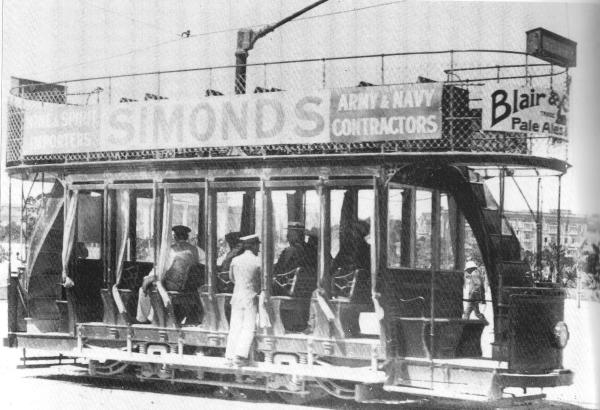
Car 4, 1910

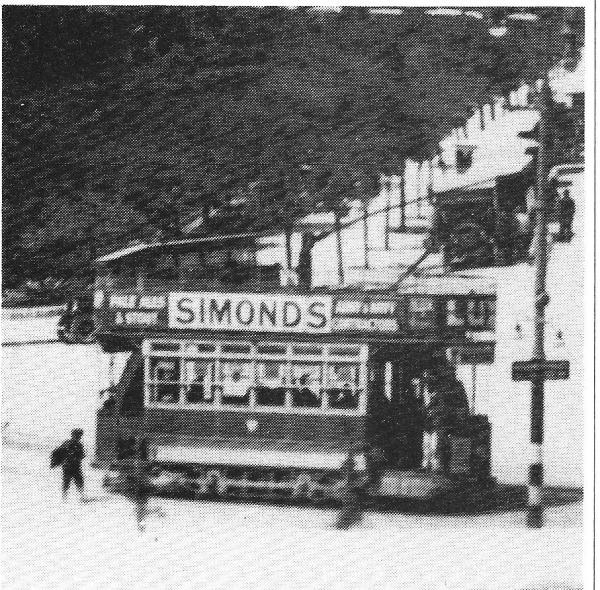
1910

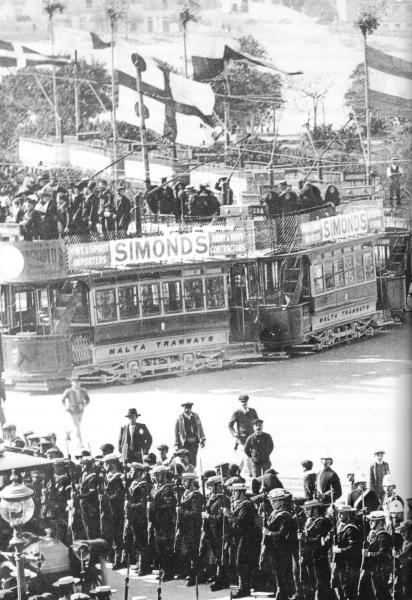
Car 1, 1912

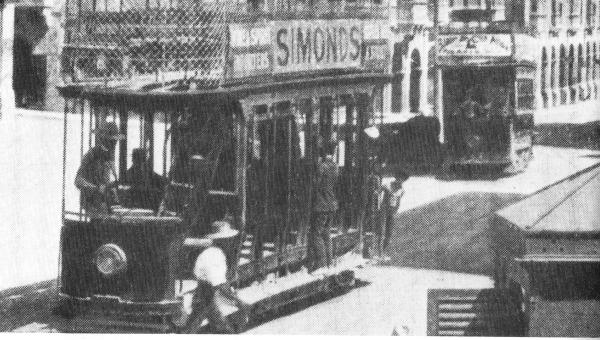
Car 10, 1920

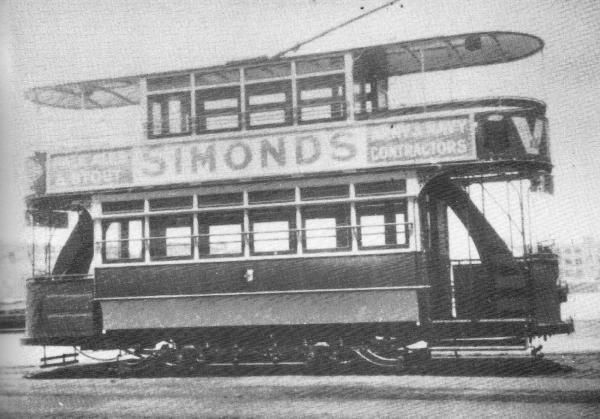
Car 6, 1926

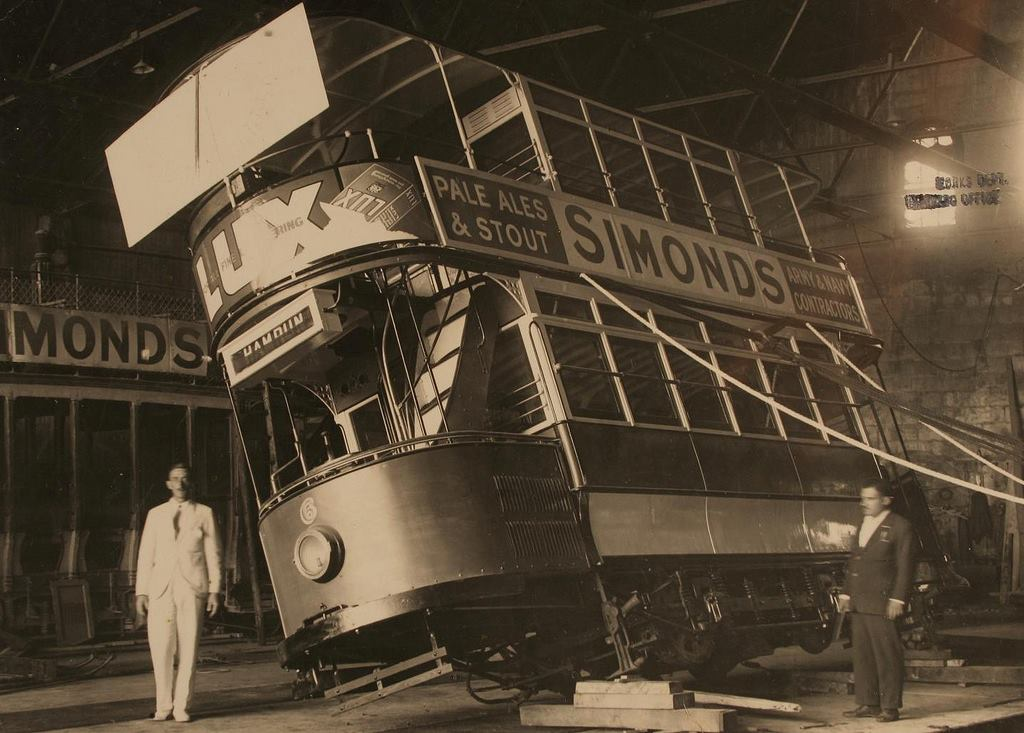
Car 6, 1927

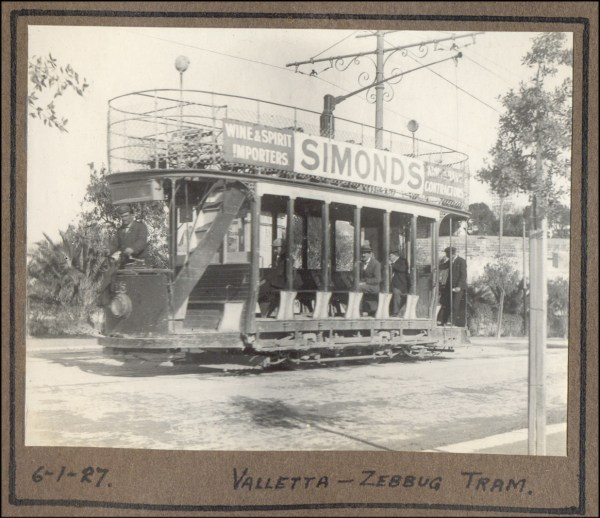
Valletta-Zebbug tram, 1927
