= Karozzin =

Maltese horse-drawn carriage

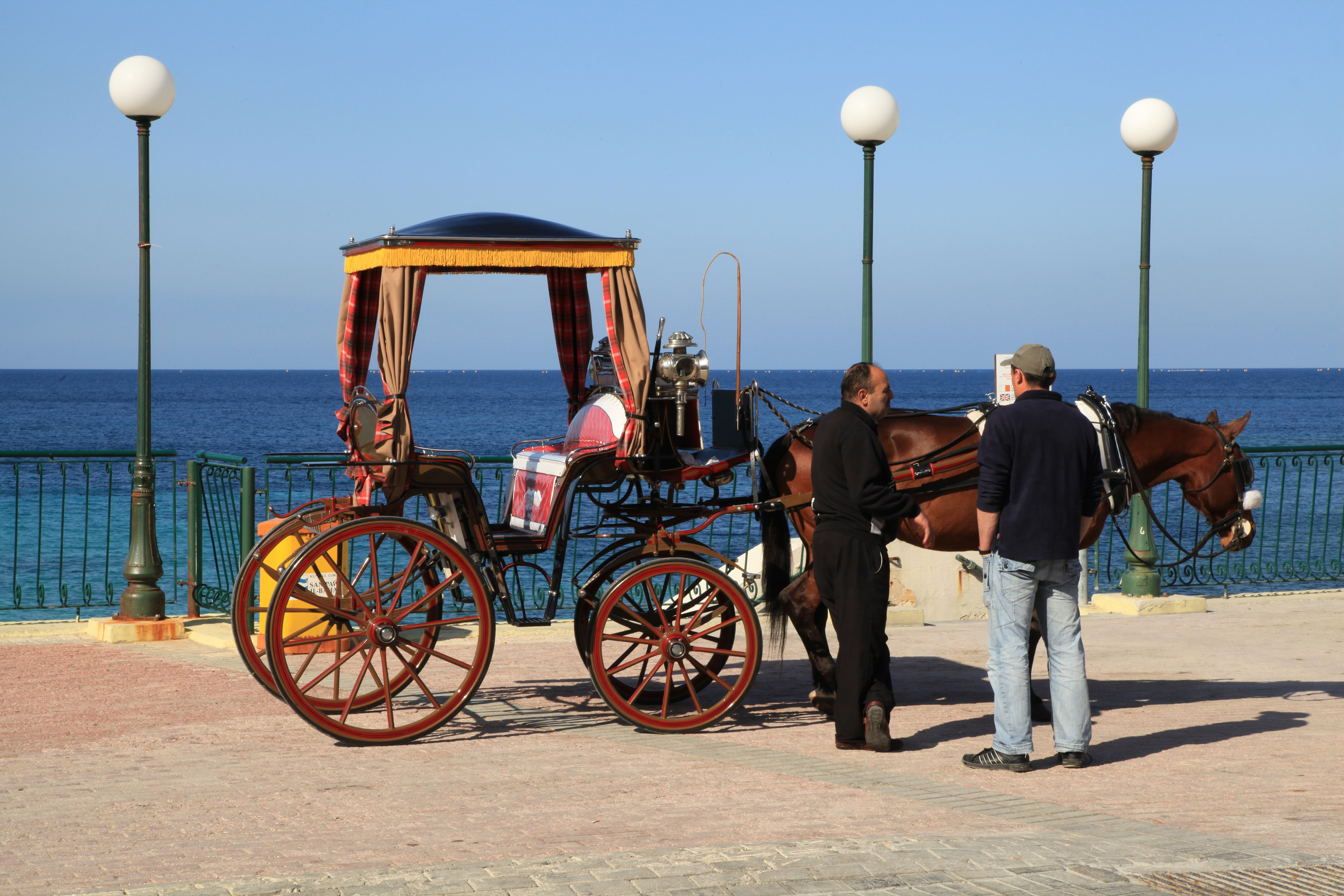
Karozzin in Malta (2013)

The karozzin is a Maltese traditional mode of transport consisting of a carriage pulled by a horse. It was once popular for general transit and is still used in ceremonies such as funerals, and as a tourist attraction. It is mostly found in Mdina and Valletta, and dates to the mid-nineteenth century.

== Description ==
The Karozzin has a canopy roof and seats four passengers face-to-face, with a driver's seat up front. The carriage body is mounted high on four elliptical springs. It is pulled by a single horse or large pony.

Karozzin carriages

Video: shows size and different angles

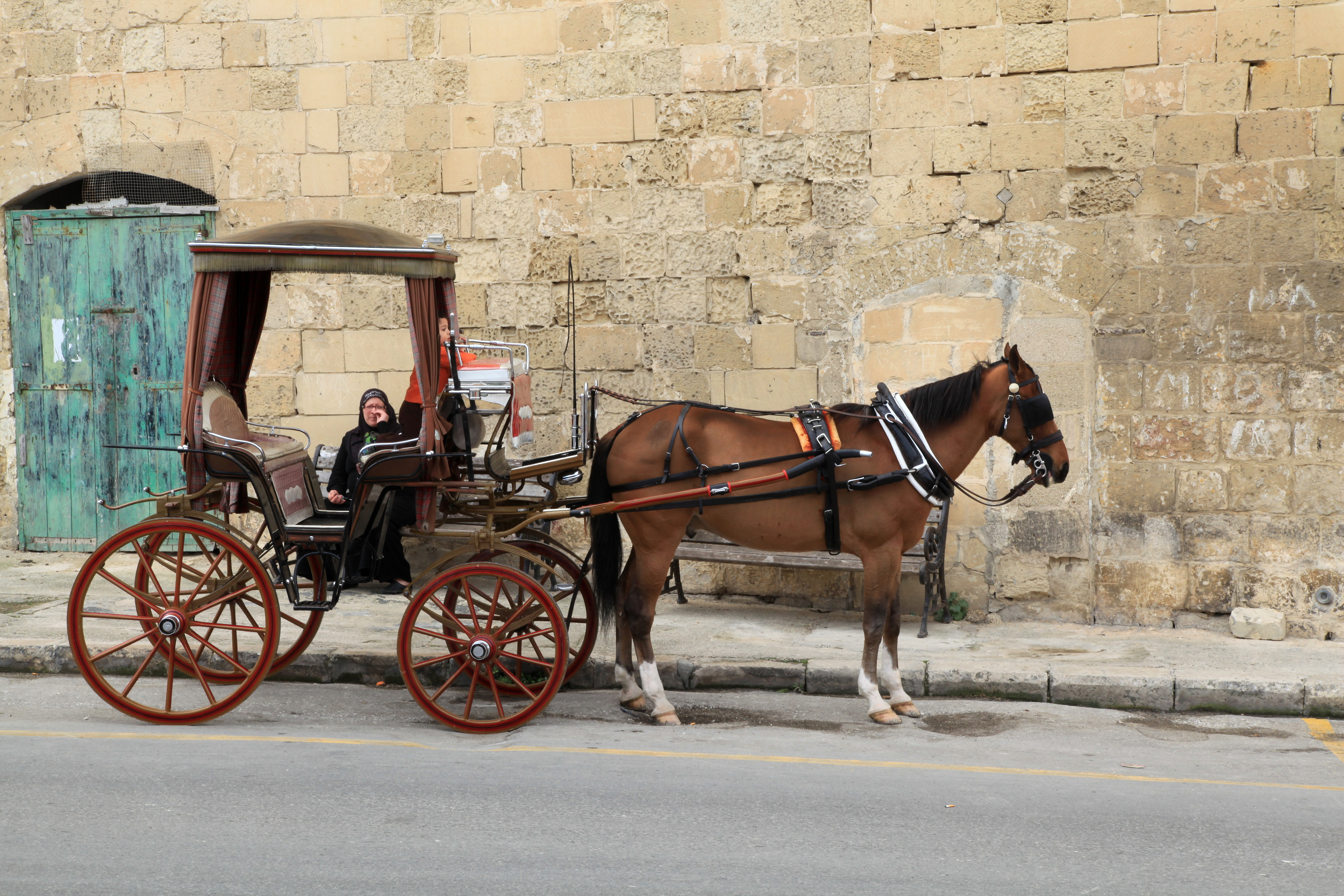
Shows harness style

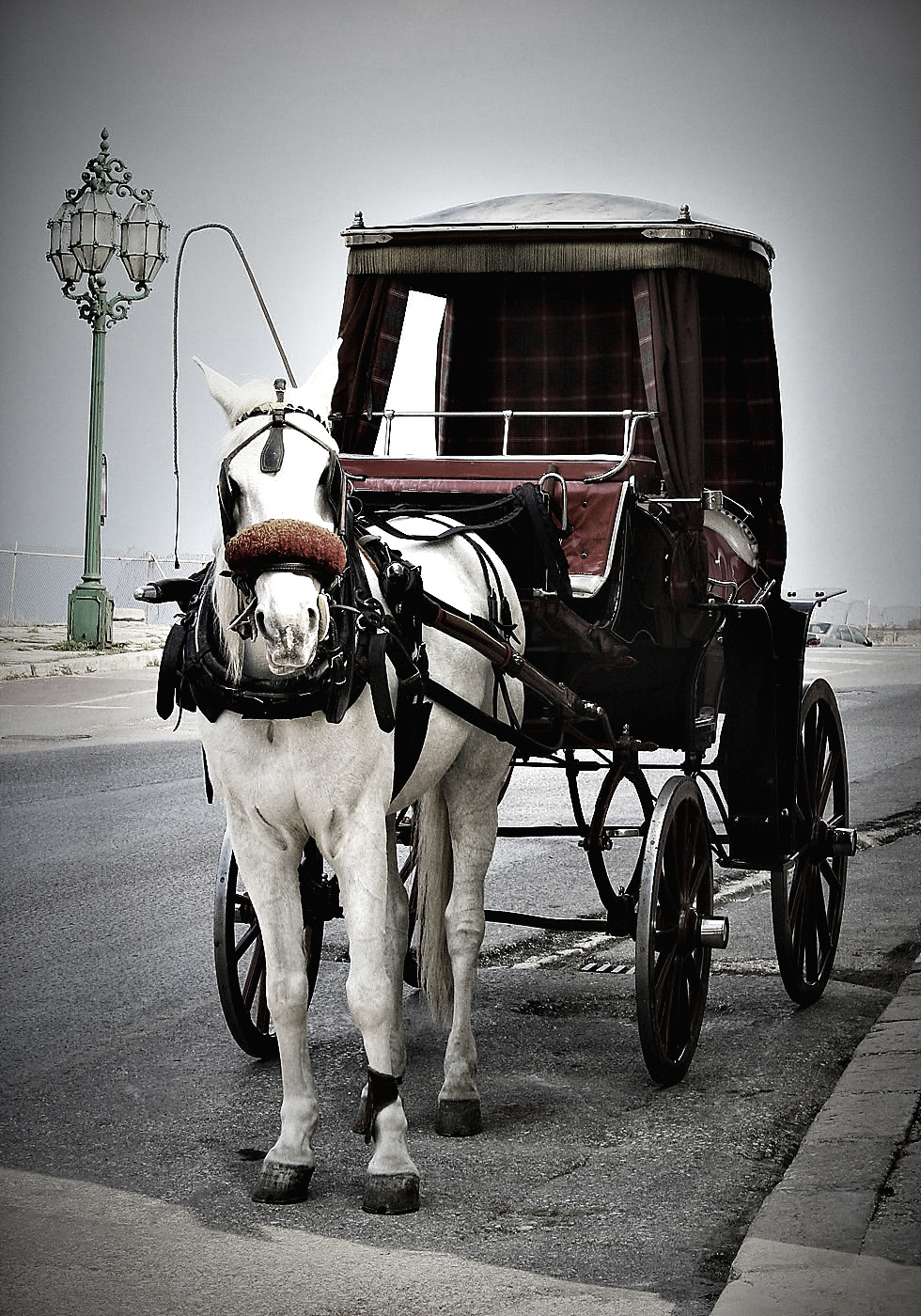
Front view

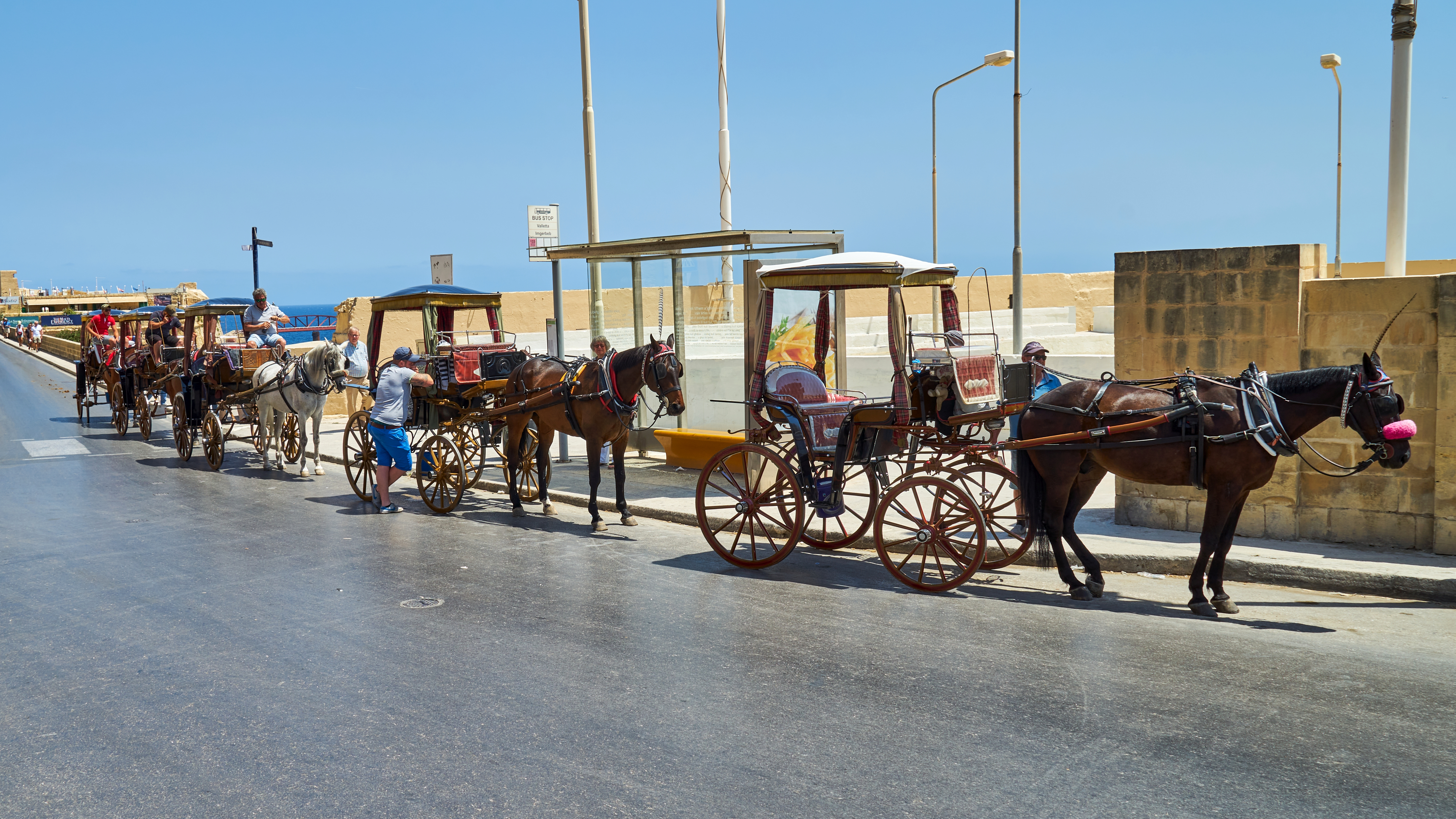
Waiting for customers in Valletta
