= Plug-in electric vehicles in Malta =

As of March 2022, there were 6,000 electric vehicles registered in Malta.

== Government policy ==
As of October 2021, the Maltese government offers subsidies of up to €12,000 for electric vehicle purchases. As of January 2023, electric and plug-in hybrid vehicles with an electric range of at least 50 kilometres (31 mi) are exempt from registration tax.

As of January 2023, 7% of vehicles in the national government fleet were electric.

== Charging stations ==
As of October 2021, the Maltese government offers subsidies of up to €900 for charging station installation.

== Public opinion ==
In a 2022 poll conducted by the European Investment Bank, 36% of respondents said that they would buy an electric car for their next vehicle purchase.
