= Transport Malta =

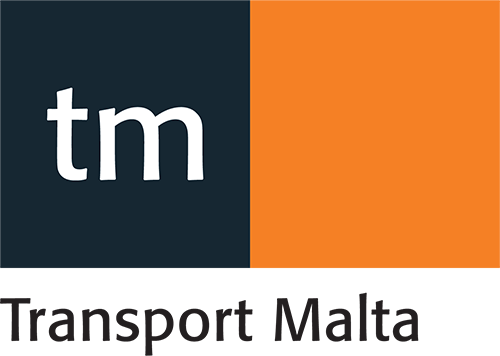

Agency overview
- Formed: 2010
- Preceding agencies: Malta Transport Authority; Malta Maritime Authority; Directorate of Civil Aviation
- Jurisdiction: Malta
- Headquarters: Lija
- Agency executive: Joseph Bugeja, Chairman
- Parent Agency: Ministry of Transport and Infrastructure
- Website: transport.gov.mt

Transport Malta (officially the Authority for Transport in Malta, Maltese: Awtorità għat-Trasport f’Malta) is a government body overseeing transport in Malta, headquartered in Lija. It falls under the authority of the Maltese Ministry of Transport and Infrastructure. It was created in 2010, taking over the previous functions of the Malta Maritime Authority, the Malta Transport Authority and the Director and Directorate of Civil Aviation. Transport Malta has charge of sea transport, including registration of ships; and regulation of civil aviation. In 2018, responsibility for building and maintenance of roads and public transport infrastructure was transferred from Transport Malta to the newly created Infrastructure Malta.

== Organisation ==
Transport Malta is composed of the following directorates:

- Integrated Transport Strategy Directorate
- Ports and Yachting Directorate
- Merchant Shipping Directorate
- Roads and Infrastructure Directorate (until 2018)
- Land Transport Directorate
- Civil Aviation Directorate
- Corporate Services Directorate
- Enforcement Directorate
- Information and Communication Technology Directorate

The Marine Safety Investigation Unit is responsible for investigating maritime accidents.
