= Ubaldesca Taccini =

Catholic religious figure

Saint Ubaldesca Taccini
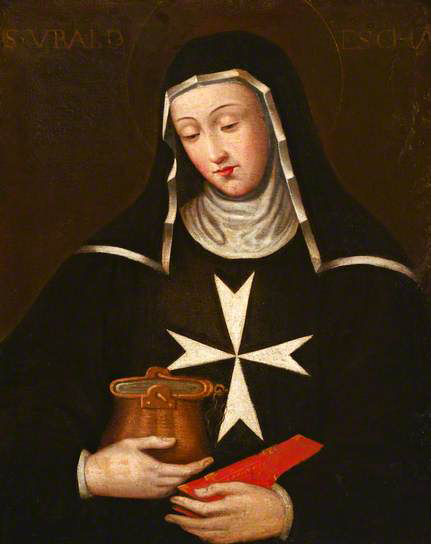
- Ubaldesca Taccini, fresco at the Museum of the Order of St John, London

Religious
- Born: 1136; Calcinaia
- Died: 1206; Pisa
- Venerated in: Catholic Church
- Major shrine: Chiesa di San Giovanni Battista (Calcinaia)
- Feast: 28 May
- Patronage: Calcinaia, Les Useres - Barri de Santa Ubaldesca (España)

Ubaldesca Taccini (Calcinaia, 1136 – Pisa, 1206) was an Italian Catholic nun and member of the Order of Saint John. Her feast day is celebrated on 28 May.

== Biography ==
Ubaldesca was born in the Republic of Pisa from a modest family, she dedicated herself to charity helping the poor and sick since early years. At the age of about sixteen, she went to Pisa and entered the hospitaller Order of St. John. For all 55 years of religious life, Ubaldesca practiced humility and charity in the monastery and in the "Spedale" of the city, serving the sick and injured.

Among the miracles attributed to her the most famous is the ability to turn water from the water well in the Church of the Santo Sepolcro in Pisa into wine. Her relics are kept in the Church of Saint John the Baptist in Calcinaia, her native town.

== Veneration ==
"In Pisa in Tuscany, in the year 1206, Saint Ubaldesca, virgin, who for fifty-five years, from the age of sixteen until her death, carried out with charity the works of mercy in the hospital of the Order of St. John of Jerusalem." (Roman martyrology)

Ubaldesca is considered one of the most influential saints of Pisa along with Bona of Pisa, Guido della Gherardesca and Rainerius. The church of Santo Sepolcro, Pisa holds a bust-reliquary of St. Ubaldesca (15th century) with a pail which, according to the tradition, belonged to the saint. St Ubaldesca Church in Paola (Malta) is dedicated to her.

Ubaldesca is the patron saint of Calcinaia. The Regata Storica sull'Arno (Historic Regatta on the Arno) is held in May in her honor and re-enacts the centuries-old activity of the ferrymen, who transported sand, brick and wood from Calcinaia to the port of Livorno.

"In the town of Les Useres (Spain), there are some ancient gozos of the Saint dated in the second half of the 18th century with the characteristic iconography of the military Order of Malta or Sanjuanista..."
