= St Ubaldesca Church =

Church of Saint Ubaldesca
- Knisja ta' Sant'Ubaldeska
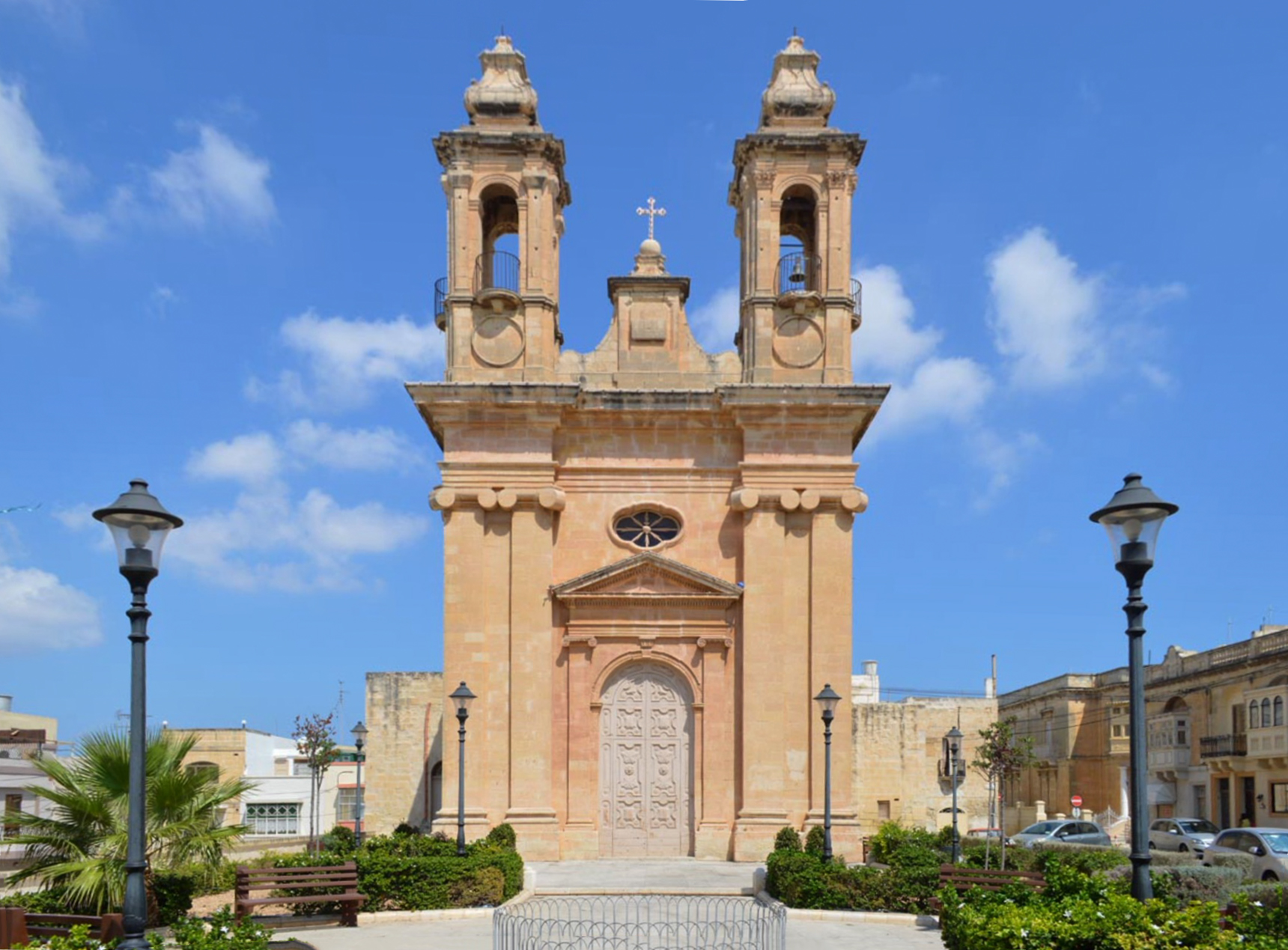
- Façade of St Ubaldesca Church
- Church of Saint Ubaldesca
- 35°52′18″N 14°30′20″E
- Location: Paola, Malta
- Denomination: Catholic Church
- Sui iuris church: Latin Church
- Churchmanship: Roman Rite

Architecture
- Functional status: Active
- Heritage designation: Cultural Heritage
- Architectural type: Church
- Style: Baroque
- Completed: 1630

Specifications
- Materials: Limestone

The St Ubaldesca Church (Maltese: Knisja ta' Sant'Ubaldeska) is a 17th-century Catholic church built during the Order of St. John in Paola, Malta. The baroque building is a historic landmark, being the oldest church established in the locality and is listed on the National Inventory of the Cultural Property of the Maltese Islands (NICPMI).

== History ==
The church is dedicated to Ubaldesca Taccini, who was born in Calcinaia, near Pisa, in 1136, and joined the Order of St. John of Jerusalem at the age of fifteen.

On 31 July 1629, Pope Urban VIII issued a papal bull granting the Order the permission to erect a church dedicated to Ubaldesca, of whom the then-grand master was very fond, with the following words: "We accept this request and to the aforementioned Antonius, with the Apostolic authority granted by this bull, we give the authority that in the mentioned town in a location of his preference, as long as it is comfortable and just, a church can be built in honour of the aforementioned Saint." On 12 November of the same year, the Order agreed to erect the church. Its foundation stone was laid on 25 August 1630 under the auspice of Antoine de Paule, who was elected as the 56th Grand Master of the Order on 10 March 1623. The feast of St Ubaldesca was commonly celebrated as the official village feast (festa) on 28 May years following the foundation of the original chapel.

After the Order left the island, the church became property of the state. After the 19th century, the population of the parish began to flourish and the church struggled to meet the spiritual needs of the people. In 1883 the Archbishop of Malta received a letter from the parish expressing their wish for the church to fulfil its role for the growing community. On 17 July 1901, the ownership of the church was relinquished to the ecclesiastical authorities, at the request of bishop Peter Pace, to serve as a parish church. During that year, a committee, presided by Marquis Giorgio Crispo Barbaro di San Giorgio and Fr. Francis Attard, was founded to take upon itself the task to foresee that materials were gathered and upgrading works were done on the church. Upgrading works were completed on 15 September 1901. In 1902, the church was enlarged and its original altarpiece, a painting by Bartolomeo Garagona, was replaced by a painting by Lazzaro Pisani.

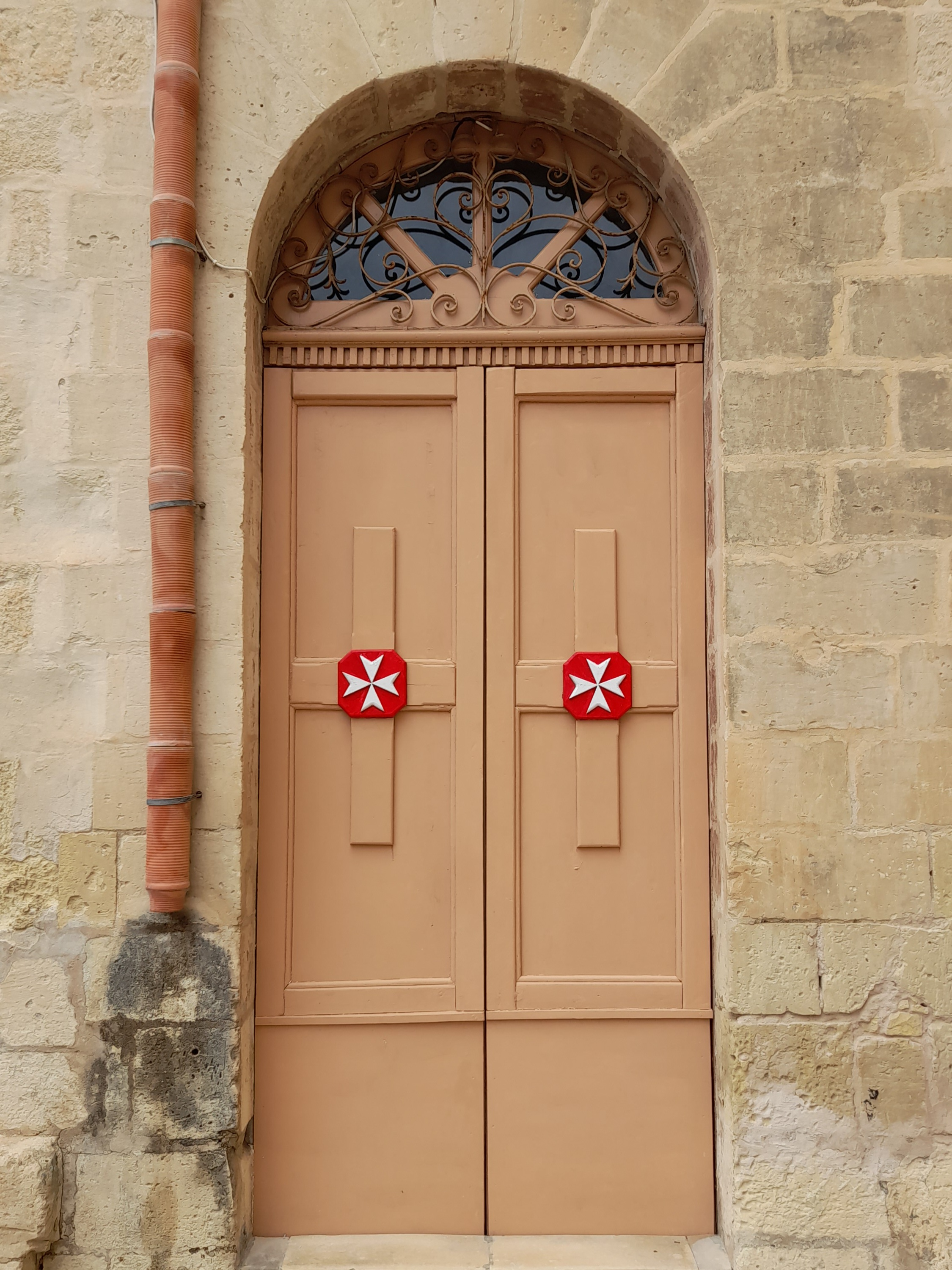
A door located on the left side of the church

The church ceased to be the parish church of Paola around 1928 when religious rituals began to be held within the Basilica of Christ the King, which had been appositely built to cater for the growing population in the town. Between 2007 and 2008 the church underwent restoration. Prior to its restoration, the facade had fallen in disrepair, with various structural damages to the sides and roof.
