= Santo Sepolcro, Pisa =

Church in Pisa, Italy

Coordinates: 43°42′52.10″N 10°24′11.76″E

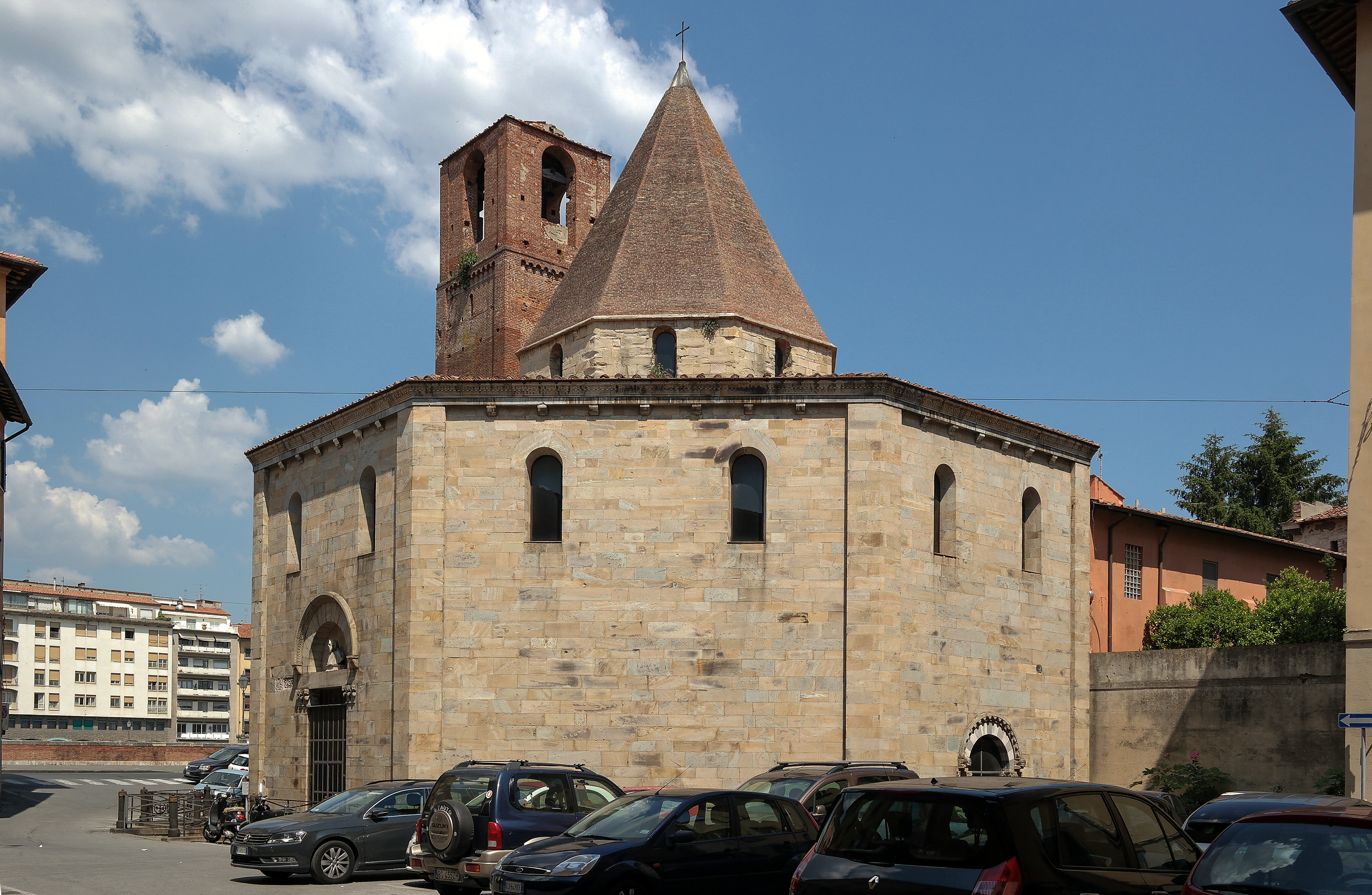
Exterior view

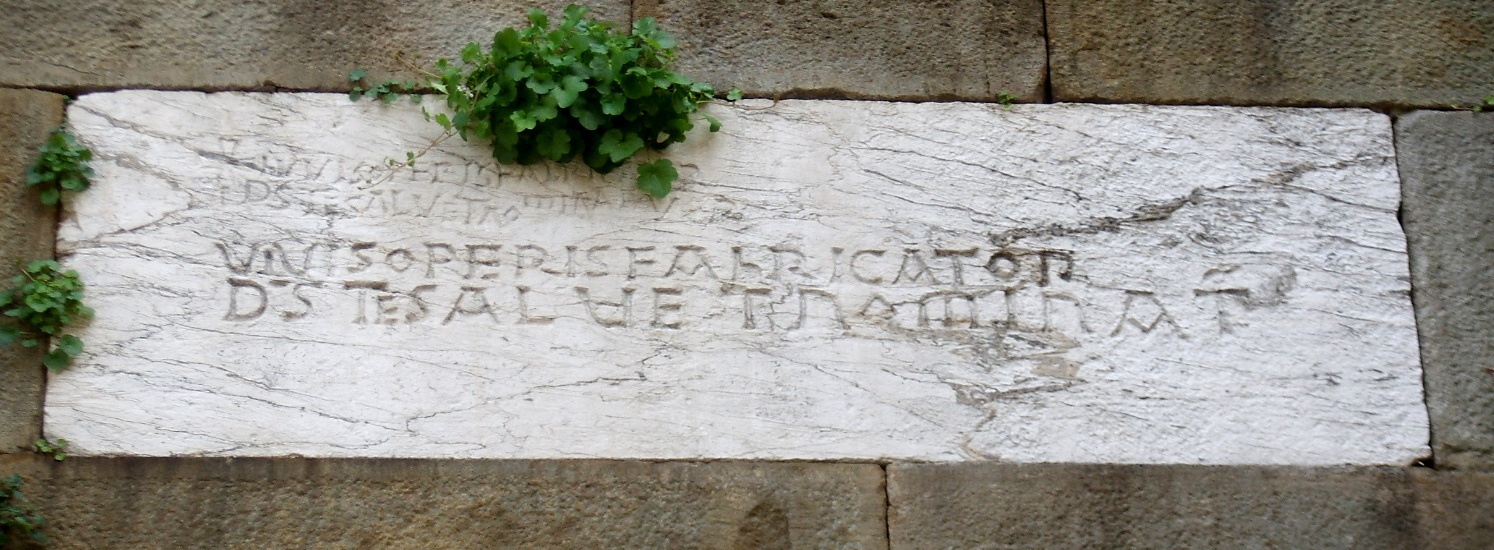
The inscription about the authorship of the building

The Church of the Santo Sepolcro (Italian: Chiesa del Santo Sepolcro, literally "church of the holy sepulchre") is an octagonal church in Pisa, Tuscany, Italy. It was built in the early 12th century under the guidance of architect Diotisalvi.

== Historical background ==
First documented in 1113 by Pisan chronicler Bernardo Maragone, the edifice is also signed with a plaque on a wall of the bell-tower that states (in Latin): [h]UIUS OPERIS FABRICATOR D[eu]S TESALVE[t] NOMINAT[ur]. Diotisalvi, (literally "God Saves You") is best known as the architect of the Pisan Baptistery, for which construction across from the Cathedral started in 1152. He probably managed to build no more than its ground storey in his lifetime, but the elevation plan of the centralized building ("Zentralbau") is also considered to be designed by him due to its similarities with the earlier church of Santo Sepolcro. Another building attributed to him due to its central plan is the chapel of Saint Agatha (1132).

Santo Sepolcro was most likely built for the Knights Hospitaller of St. John of Jerusalem (Ospitalieri di San Giovanni di Gerusalemme), and not for the Knights Templar as is often erroneously believed. The hospital of the order was built not far from the Arno river, just outside the city walls in the recently growing village of Chinzica.

The church lends its name from the Holy Sepulchre in Jerusalem from which relics were brought to Pisa by archbishop Dagobert (tenure 1088–1105, he later became Latin Patriarch of Jerusalem) by the end of the First Crusade (1096–1099). For the veneration of these relics the church was built. Its origins are also manifest in the centrally structured shape within a shape which recalls the Church of the Holy Sepulchre, as well as the Dome of the Rock, both located in Jerusalem, then conquered by the Christians.

The convent was later passed to the Knights of Malta, successors to the Hospitallers. From 1817, when the order was suppressed, it experienced a period of decay, until restoration work was undertaken in 1849, which brought to light the original floor level, which was now more than a meter below the level of the surrounding square. To restore the building to its medieval appearance, it was also decided to demolish the Renaissance loggia and the masonry vaults of the internal ambulatory, remove Baroque furnishings, and restore some windows.

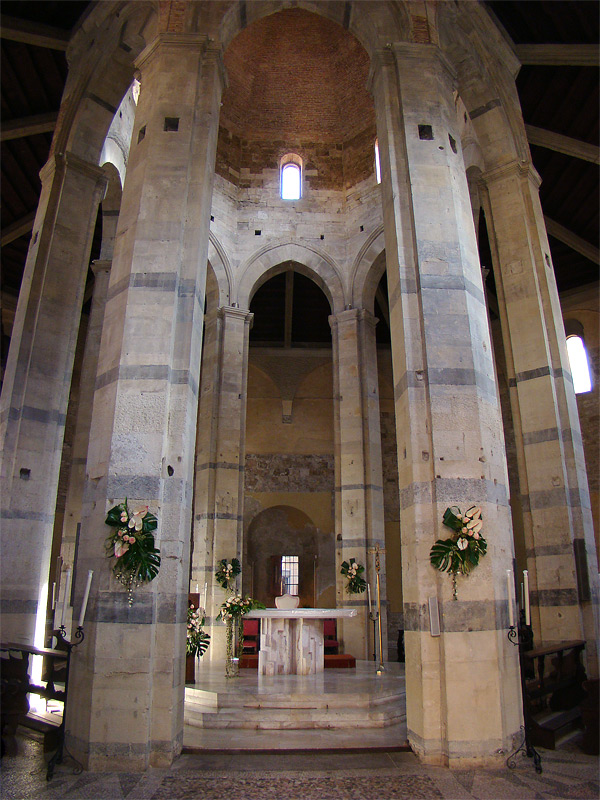
Eight large multi-angled columns with pointed arches support the drum of the tented roof

== Description ==
Situated near the southbank of the Arno river (while the city's center lies on the north side), the small building has an octagonal plan with a tented roof on a windowed drum. It takes up about the central third of the building's width, and adapts the same eight-sided shape. The main portal and two more (remaining) doors on its north and south side have round arches with lion heads as imposts for the moldings of acanthus leaves which border the bicoloured arches, typical of Tuscan architecture. The capitals of the portal frame are Romanesque derivatives of the Corinthian order. Each wall has two small windows just beneath the slightly protruding tile-covered roof. The west side of the building (including the fourth door) is closed off by a Renaissance building, with even the north door somewhat compromised. Until the 19th century, the church was emcompassed by a portico of the 16th century with a few steps in front of each of the three entrances.

The unfinished small bell-tower is in Pisane-Romanesque style, with rectangular plan.

=== The interior ===
The internal space is dominated by the imposing circle of eight large, multi-angled columns and pointed arches. They support the drum of the tented roof, under which the altar stands on a slightly elevated platform. In 1720 the church's interior was refurbished in Baroque style, but destroyed again during the reconstruction in the mid-19th century, as was the exterior Renaissance portico. The interior remains much altered and restored.

Objects still remaining include a 15th-century bust-reliquary of St. Ubaldesca with a pail which, according to the tradition, belonged to the saint; and a 15th-century panel of Madonna with Child. From the 18th century the "excellent" Saint Ranierio (1775), the patron saint of Pisa, by Giovanni Battista Tempesti (whose best known frescoes are in Pisa Cathedral and the Archiepiscopal Palace), and the tombstone of Marie Mancini (1639–1715), niece of Cardinal Mazarin.

Pisa's Museo Nazionale di San Matteo houses a life-size wooden crucifix from around 1150–1200, that decorated the church in its beginning (Cross No. 15).

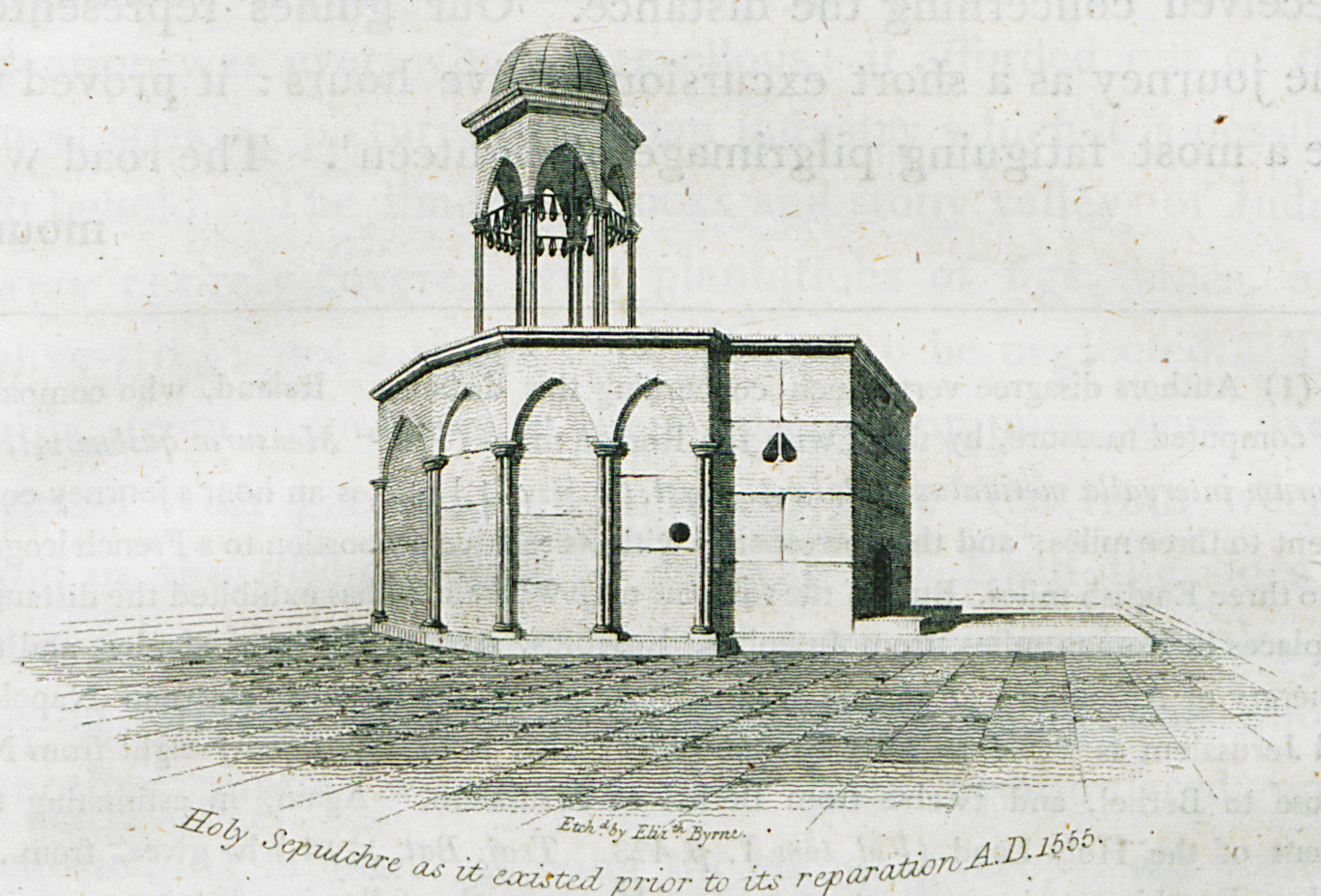
The Church of the Holy Sepulchre in Jerusalem before 1555 (Edward Daniel Clarke, 1824)

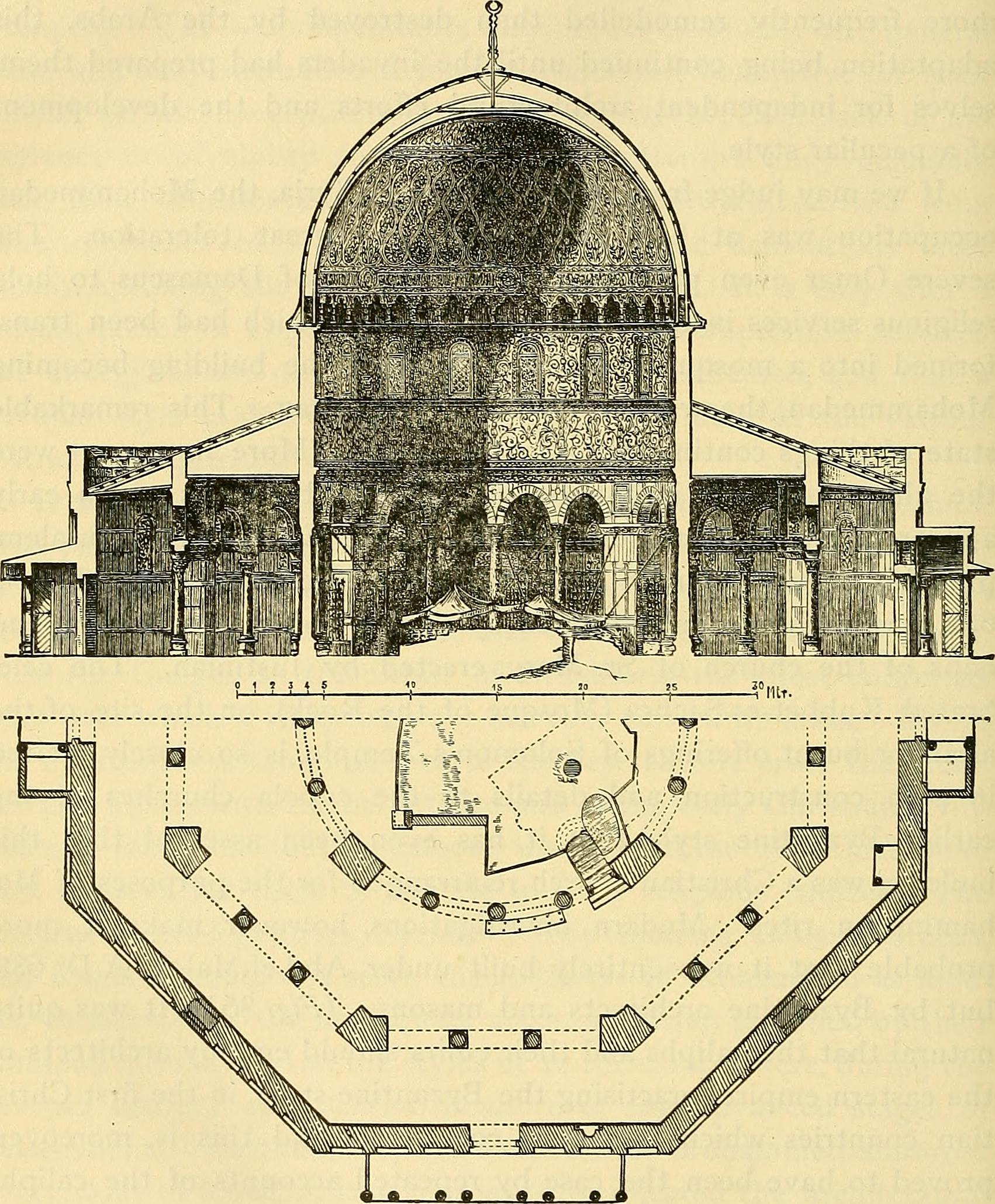
Plan of the Dome of the Rock, 7. ct. (1893)

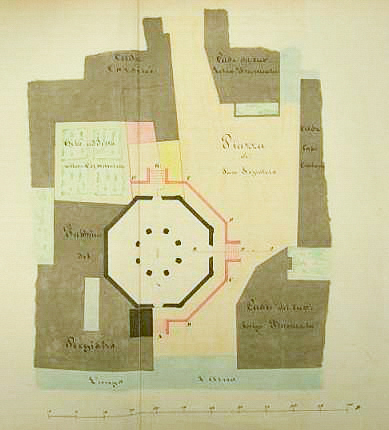
Ground plan of Santo Sepolcro with Renaissance portico

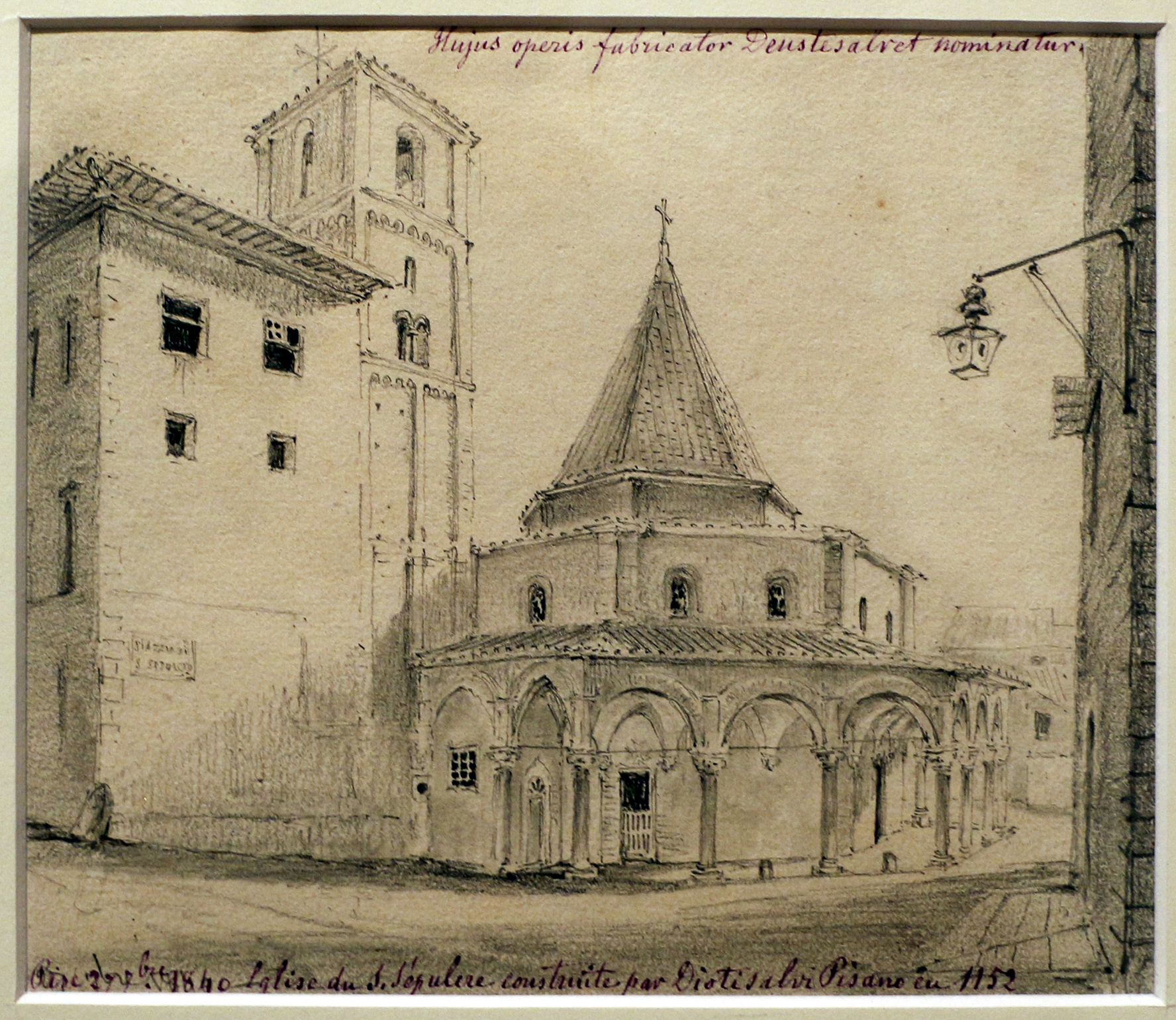
Santo Sepolcro with the Renaissance arcade (later removed) in a drawing by Adèle Poussielgue (1840)

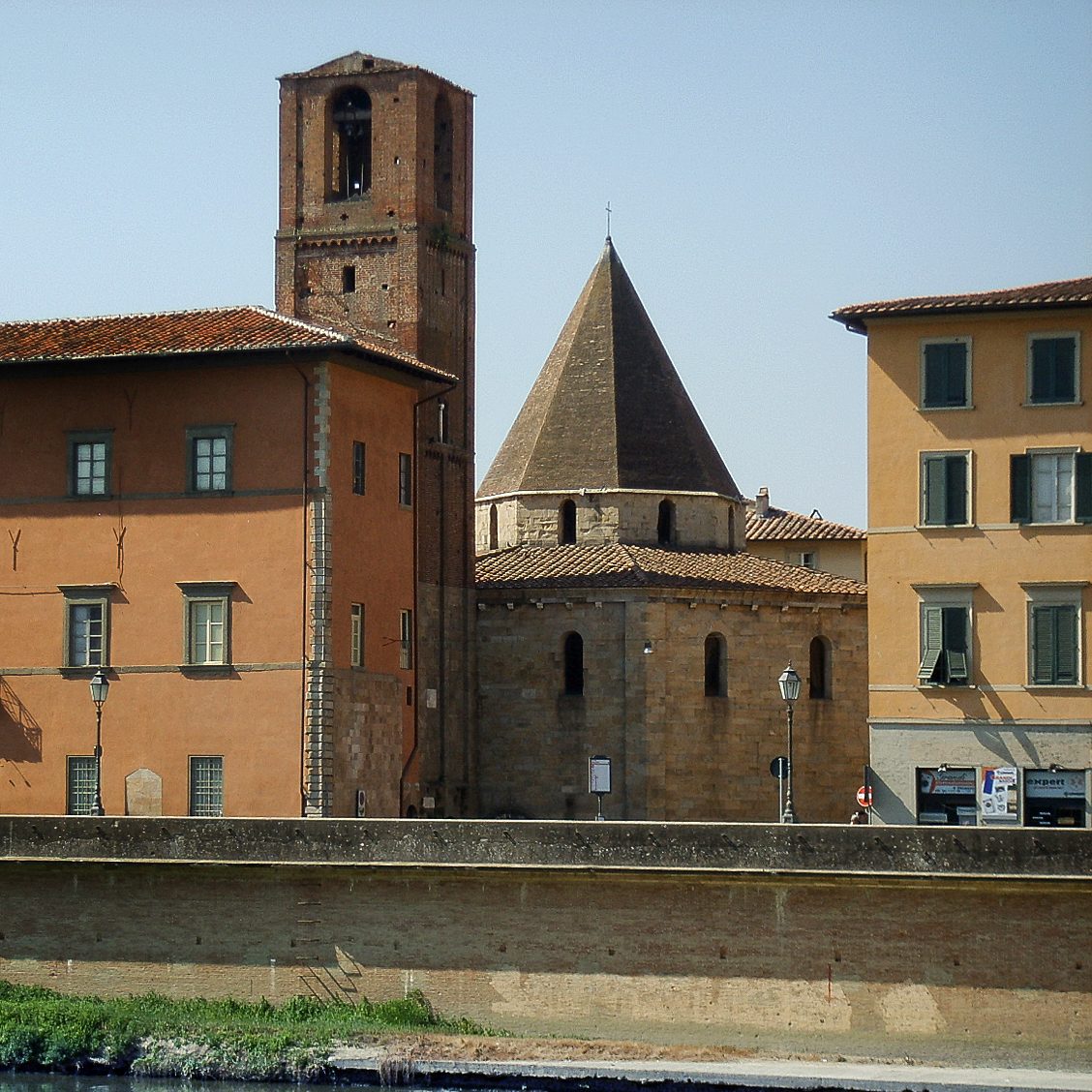
Exterior view from the opposing south bank of the Arno river

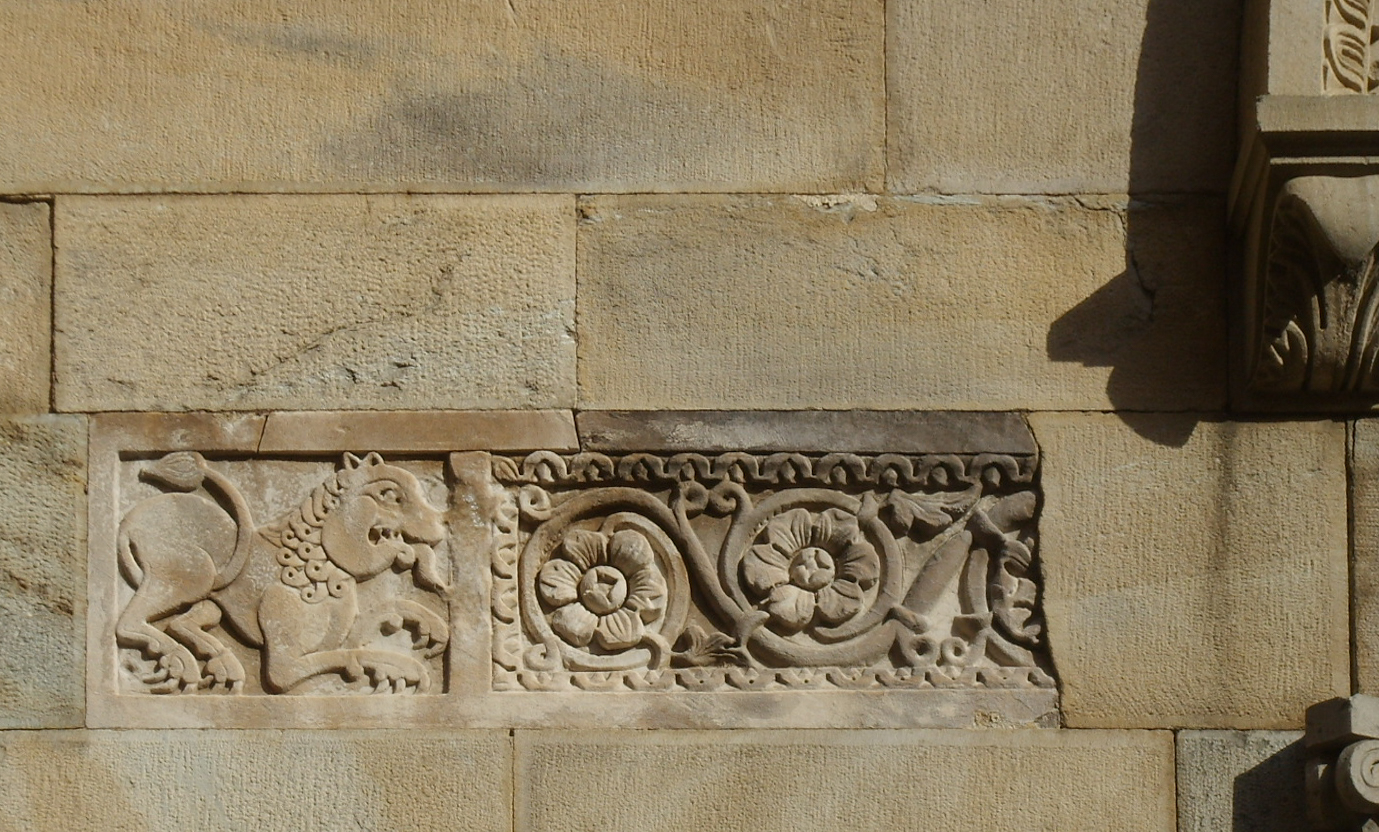
A spolia on the left of the main portal

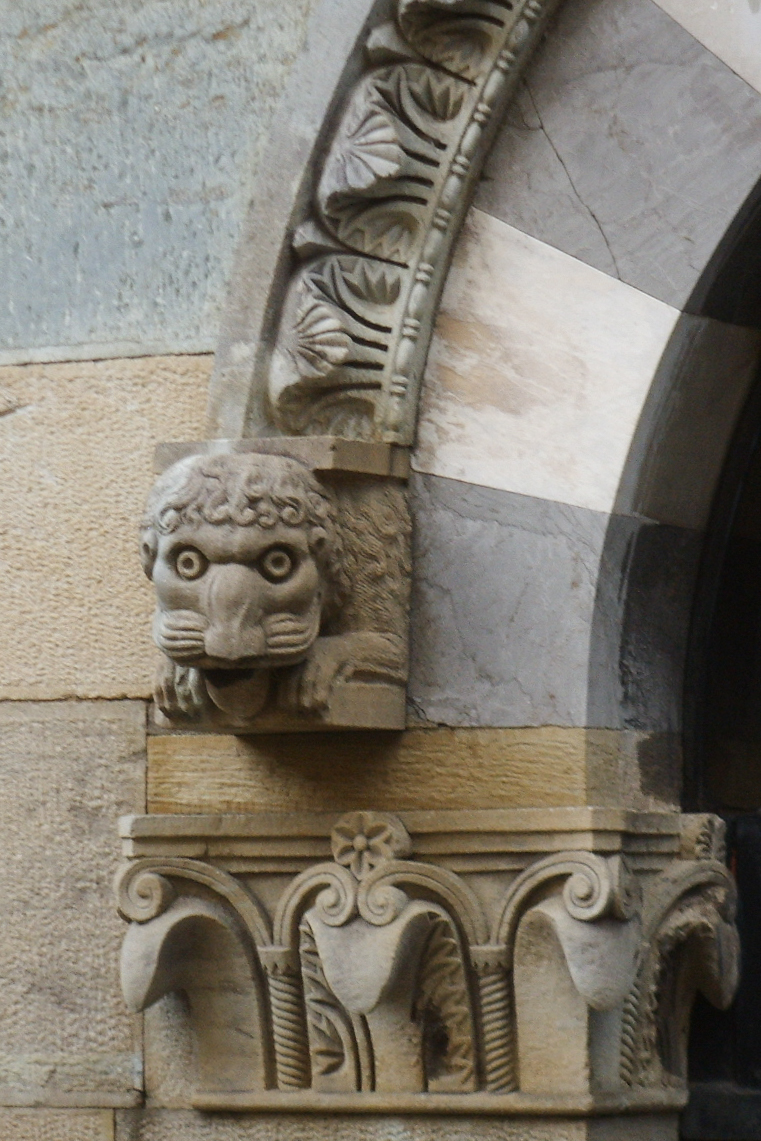
Capital derivative of the Corinthian order and lion head as impost for the moulding of the right portal arch with Acanthus leaves

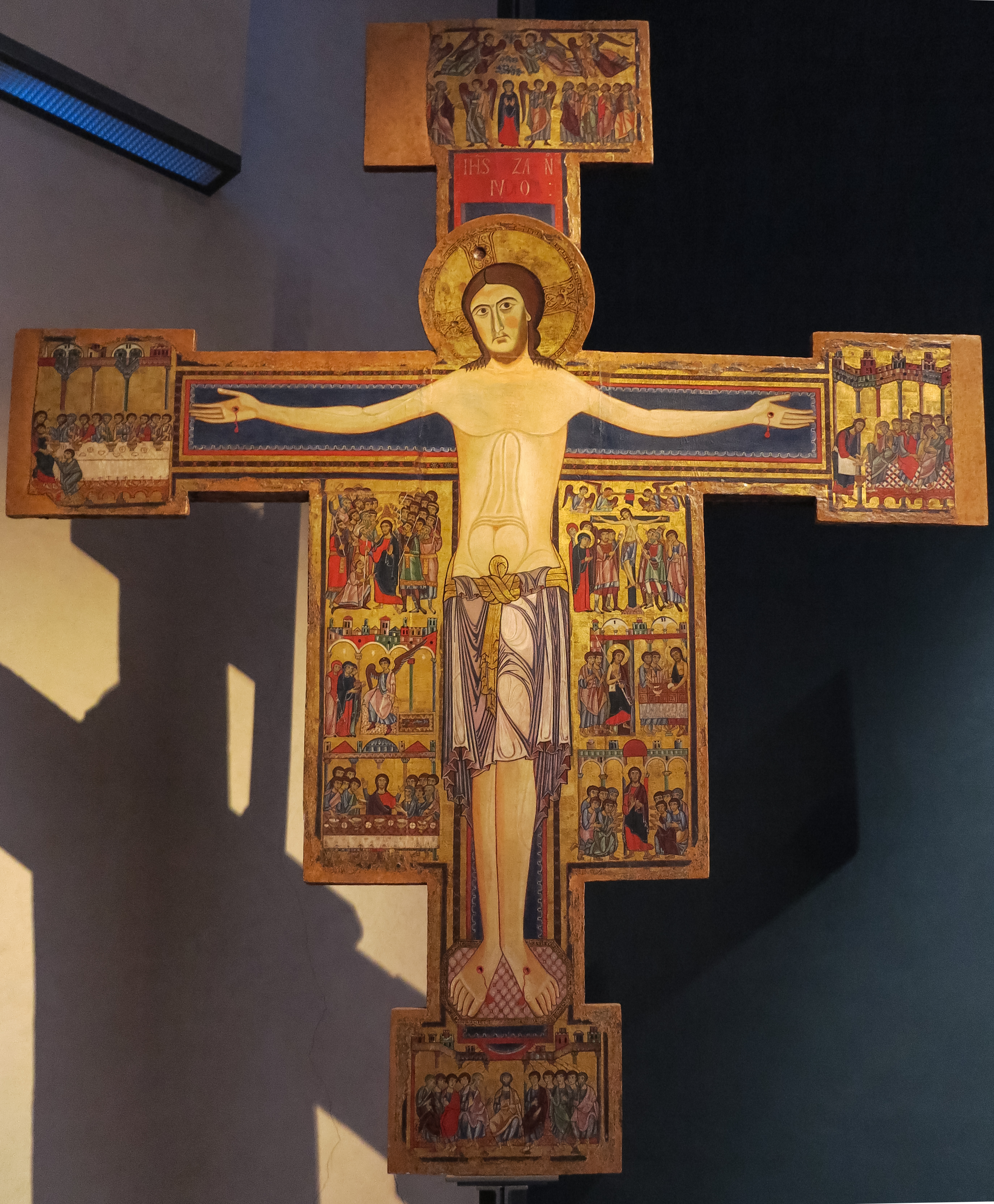
The Cross No. 15 of the archeological museum in Pisa
