= Basilica of Christ the King, Paola =

Basilica of Christ the King
- Il-Bażilika ta' Kristu Re
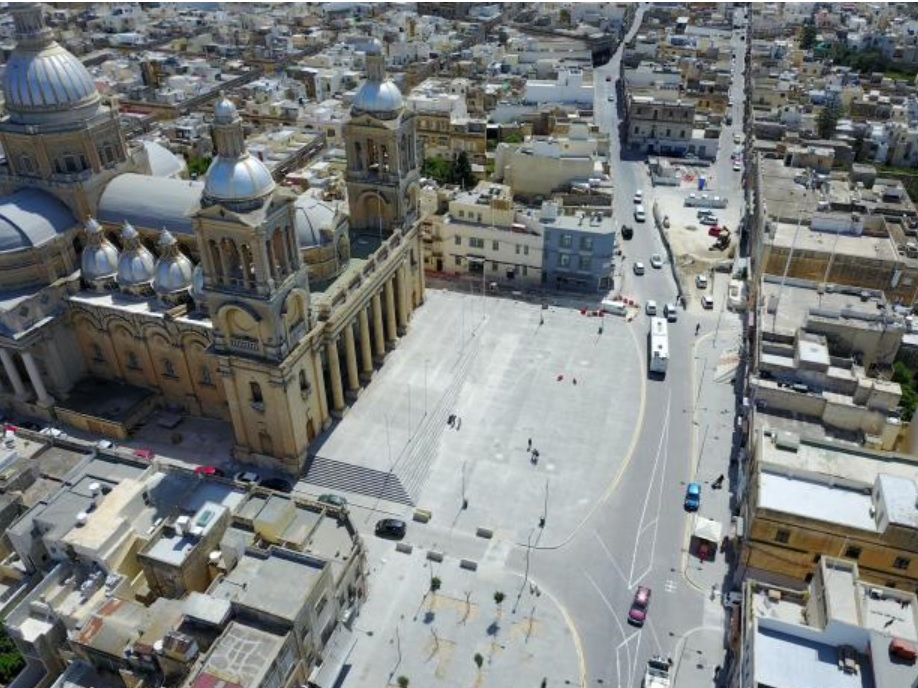
- Basilica of Christ the King
- 35°52′18″N 14°30′30″E
- Location: Paola, Malta
- Denomination: Roman Catholic

History
- Status: Active
- Dedication: Christ the King
- Consecrated: 3 June 1967

Architecture
- Functional status: Parish church
- Architect: Ġużè Damato
- Architectural type: Church
- Groundbreaking: 1924
- Completed: 1959

Specifications
- Length: 90 metres

Administration
- Archdiocese: Malta
- Parish: Christ the King

Clergy
- Rector: canon Marc Andre' Camilleri

The Basilica of Christ the King (Maltese: Il-Bażilika ta' Kristu Re) is a Roman Catholic parish church located in Paola, Malta.

== History ==
The parish of Paola or as it more commonly known as Raħal Ġdid, was created in 1910 by Archbishop Pietro Pace. The 17th-century St Ubaldesca Church was chosen as the parish church. Plans were made for a larger church to be built.

In 1924 the cornerstone was laid by the stonemason Vincenzo Costa who lived in Rangu Street in the nearby village of Luqa, and thus construction commenced. Sometime in the late 1920s or early 1930s, stonework was being done by Manuel and his brother Carmnu Cassar. Photographs exist showing Manuel and Carmnu erecting the arches. The formwork and the hoist to erect the arches are still in the basement of the church. Manuel Cassar was the son of Carmena and Joseph Cassar, also a stonemason and builder who built many houses in Paola. Joseph was from Tarxien and Carmena from Mellieħa. They lived in Triq il-Qalb ta Ġesù (Heart of Jesus Street), which was adjacent to the church. The church started to be used as the parish church in 1936. The church was consecrated and dedicated to Christ the King on 3 June 1967 by Archbishop Mikiel Gonzi.

On 5 April 2020 a decree was signed in the Vatican, by virtue of which the church was raised to the designation of a minor basilica.

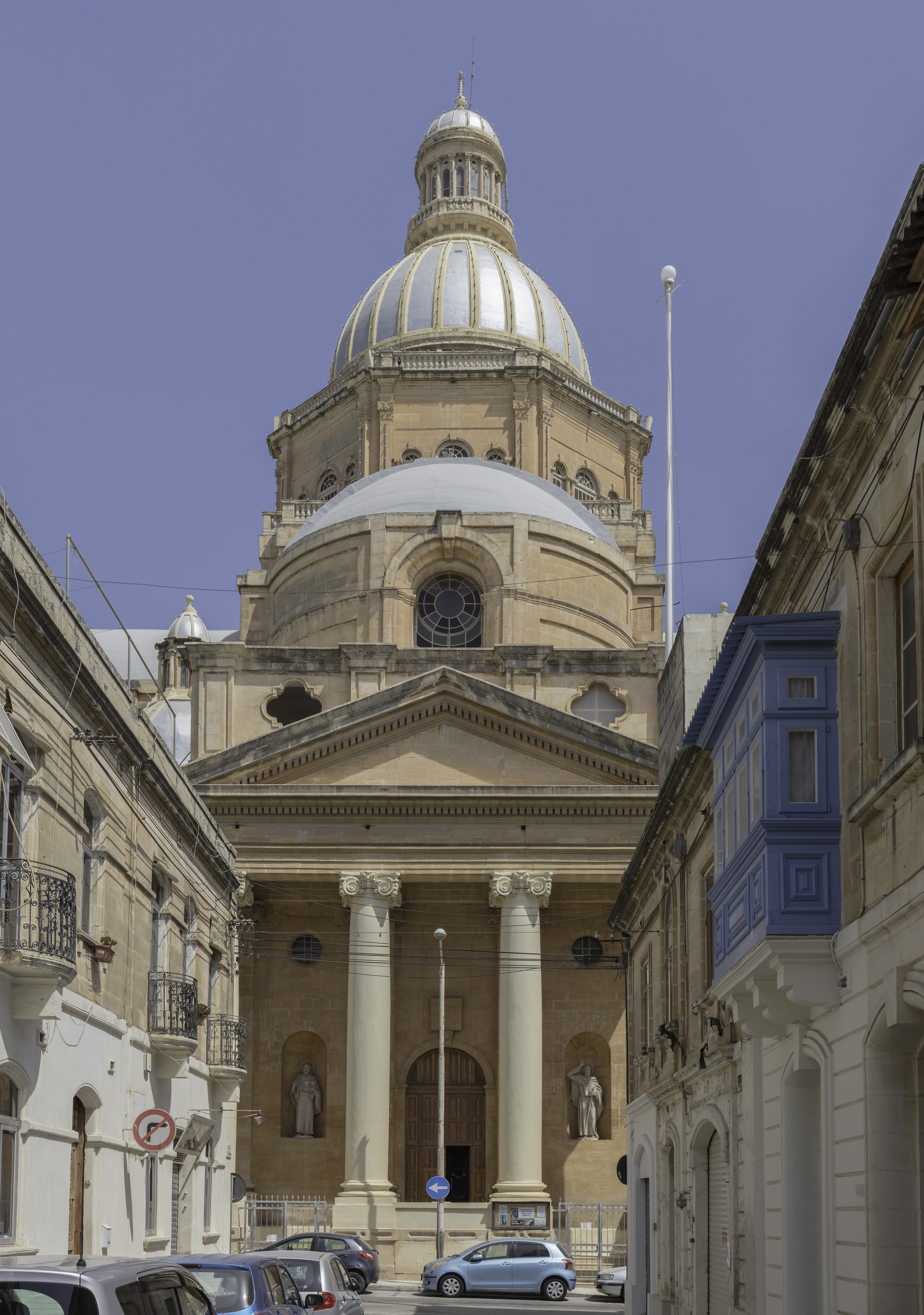
View from a surrounding street

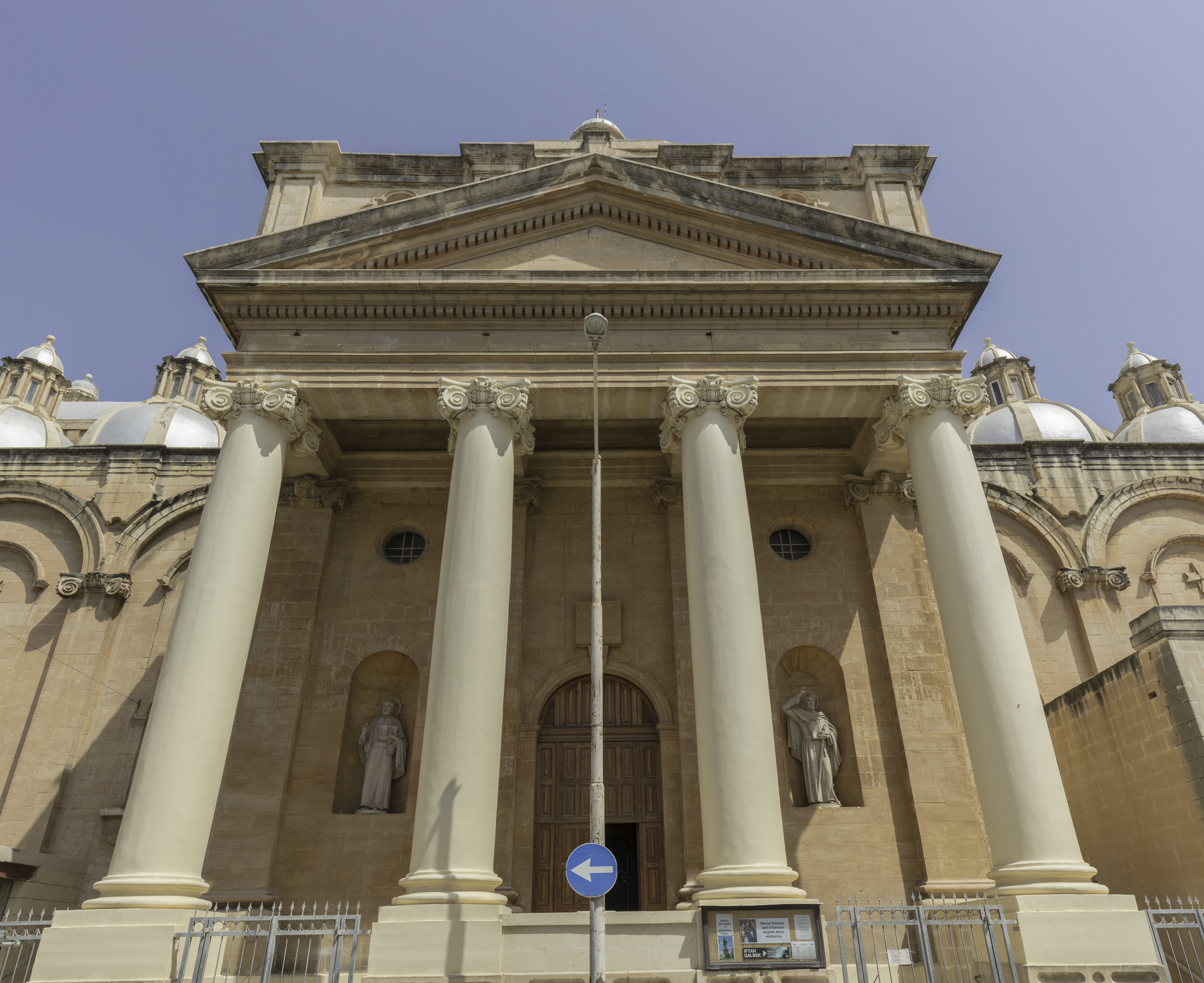
Entrance

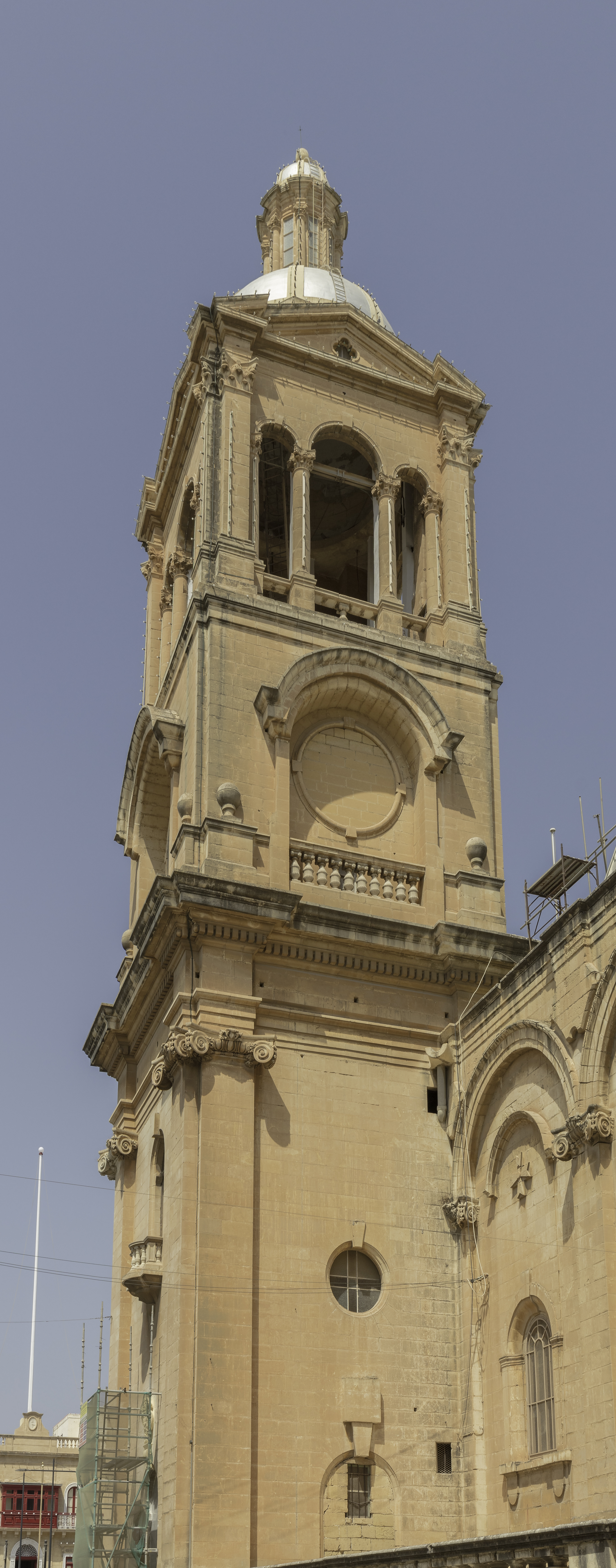
Bell tower

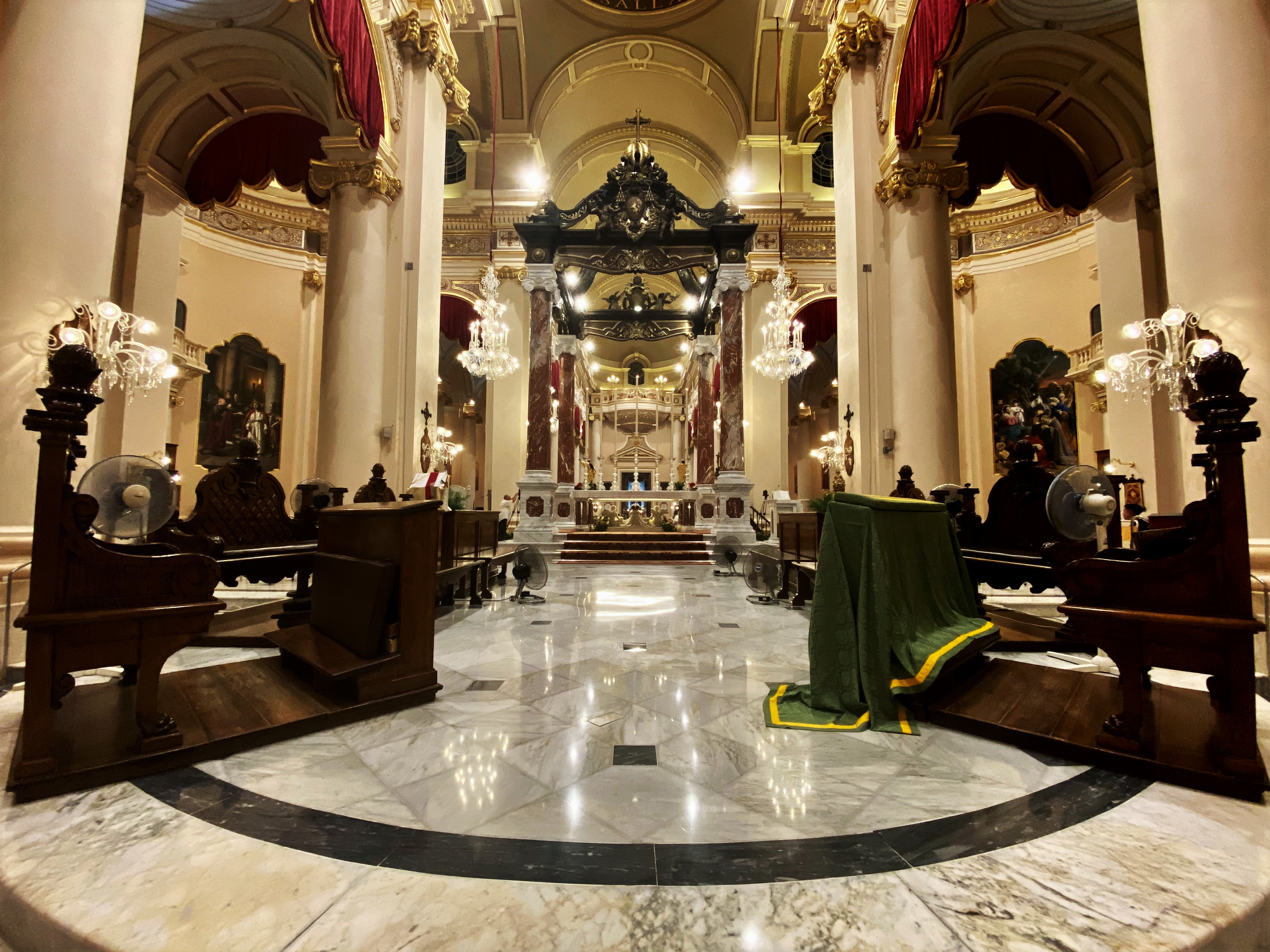
Basilica of Christ the King, Paola

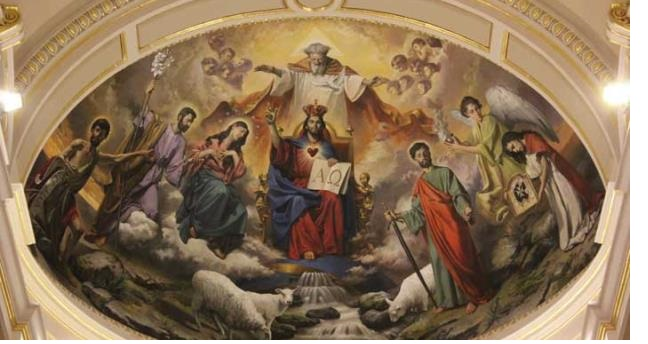
This affresco painted by Manuel Farrugia depicts God the Father, Son, and Holy Spirit, a stream of water with some sheep drinking from it representing the pilgrim Church drinking from the water of life emanating from the Trinity, St. John the Baptist, St. Joseph, St. Mary, some angels, St. Paul who brought the faith to the Maltese Islands, and an allegorical figure representing the Eucharistic Congress of 1913 when the Paola residents of that time decided to dedicate the Parish to Christ the King instead of St. Ubaldisca as it had been dedicated up to that time.

== See also ==
- List of basilicas
- St Ubaldesca Church
