= Luís Mendes de Vasconcellos =

Portuguese colonial administrator and Grand Master of the Order of Saint John

Luís Mendes de Vasconcelos
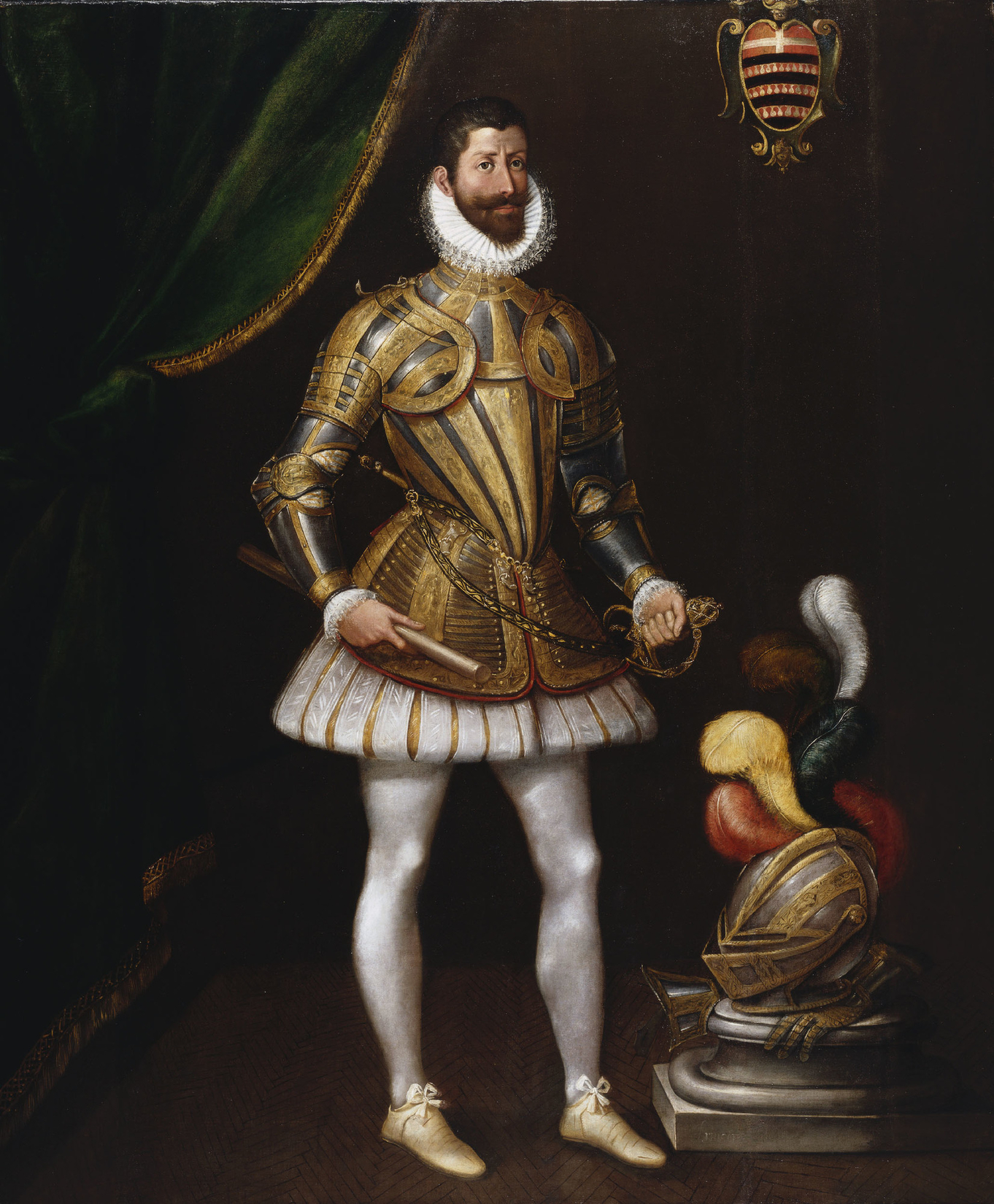

Governor of Portuguese Angola
- In office 1617–1621
- Monarch: King Philip II
- Preceded by: Manuel Cerveira Pereira
- Succeeded by: João Correia de Sousa

Grand Master of the Order of Saint John
- In office 17 September 1622 – 7 March 1623
- Preceded by: Alof de Wignacourt
- Succeeded by: Antoine de Paule

Personal details
- Born: c. 1542 Évora, Kingdom of Portugal
- Died: 7 March 1623 (aged c.81) Malta
- Resting place: St. John's Co-Cathedral
- Children: Joanne Mendes de Vasconcelos

Military service
- Allegiance: (Portugal) Portuguese Empire (Sovereign Military Order of Malta) Order of Saint John

Luís Mendes de Vasconcelos (Note: Owing to a lack of orthographical standardization before 1911, his name has historically been spelled a number of ways, such as (Luis vs. Luiz, Mendes vs. Mendez, Vasconcelos vs. Vasconcellos, etc.)) (c. 1542 – March 7, 1623) was a Portuguese nobleman who served as colonial Governor of Angola between 1617 and 1621, and the 55th Grand Master of the Order of Saint John between 1622 and 1623. He was also a writer.

== Biography ==
He was born in Évora, Portugal in around 1542. He was the son of Francisco Mendes de Vasconcelos (brother of Luís da Costa, a servant of Henrique of Portugal) and Isabel Pais de Oliveira; paternal grandson of Cristóvão Nunes da Costa (natural son of Luís Nunes da Costa by Isabel Botelho and brother of Brás Nunes da Costa who had natural issue by Catarina Anes) and Catarina Mendes de Vasconcelos; and maternal grandson of Paio Rodrigues de Vilalobos and Isabel de Oliveira.

From 1608 to 1612 he was a writer in Lisbon.

In 1617 Vasconcelos became Governor of the Portuguese colony of Angola. He suppressed a revolt in 1618. During his three-year term as governor, he enslaved about 50,000 Angolans and shipped them to the Americas.

Vasconcelos was also a distinguished member of the Order of Saint John of Jerusalem. He was well known for his bravery in various naval expeditions against the Ottoman Empire. He was elected Grandmaster of the Order on 17 September 1622, after the death of Alof de Wignacourt.

He was the first Portuguese Grandmaster since Afonso of Portugal, and the first one in Malta. Vasconcelos served as Grandmaster for less than six months, dying on 7 March 1623. He was succeeded by Antoine de Paule.

He was the father of Joanne Mendes de Vasconcelos, who fought in the Portuguese Restoration War.

== See also ==
- Angolan Wars

== Notes ==
| Preceded by Alof de Wignacourt | Grand Master of the Knights Hospitaller; 1622–1623 | Succeeded by Antoine de Paule |
