= Fornacette =

- Frazione
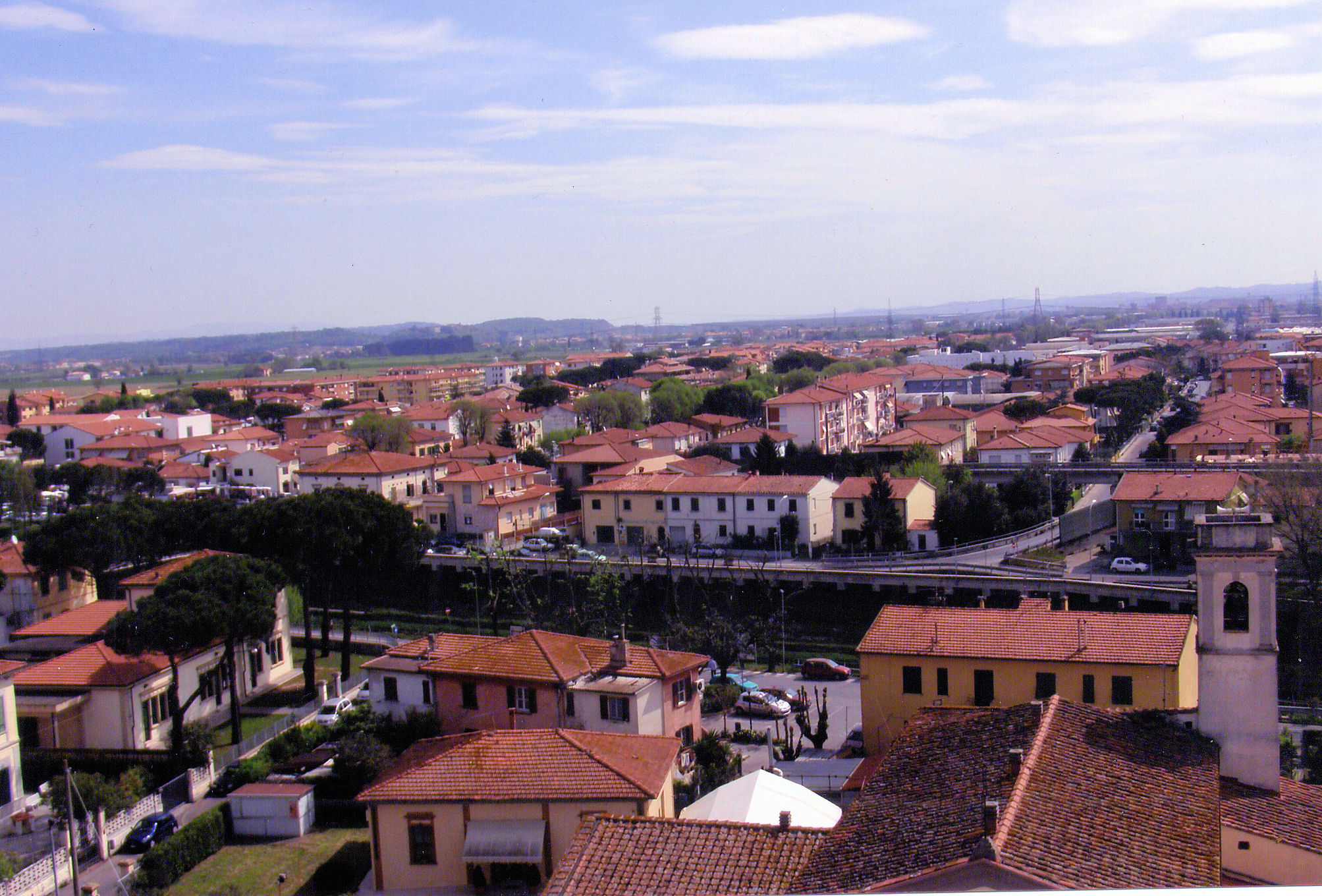
- View of Fornacette

- Location of Fornacette in Italy
- Coordinates: 43°40′14″N 10°34′49″E
- Country: Italy
- Region: Tuscany
- Province: Pisa (PI)
- Comune: Calcinaia
- Elevation: 11 m (36 ft)

Population (2011)
  - Total: 5,868
- Time zone: UTC+1 (CET)
  - Summer (DST): UTC+2 (CEST)
- Postal code: 56012
- Dialing code: (+39) 0587

Fornacette is a town in Tuscany, central Italy, administratively a frazione of the comune of Calcinaia, province of Pisa. At the time of the 2001 census its population was 4,763.

Fornacette is about 20 km from Pisa and 4 km from Calcinaia.
