= Antoine de Paule =

56th Grand Master of the Knights Hospitaller

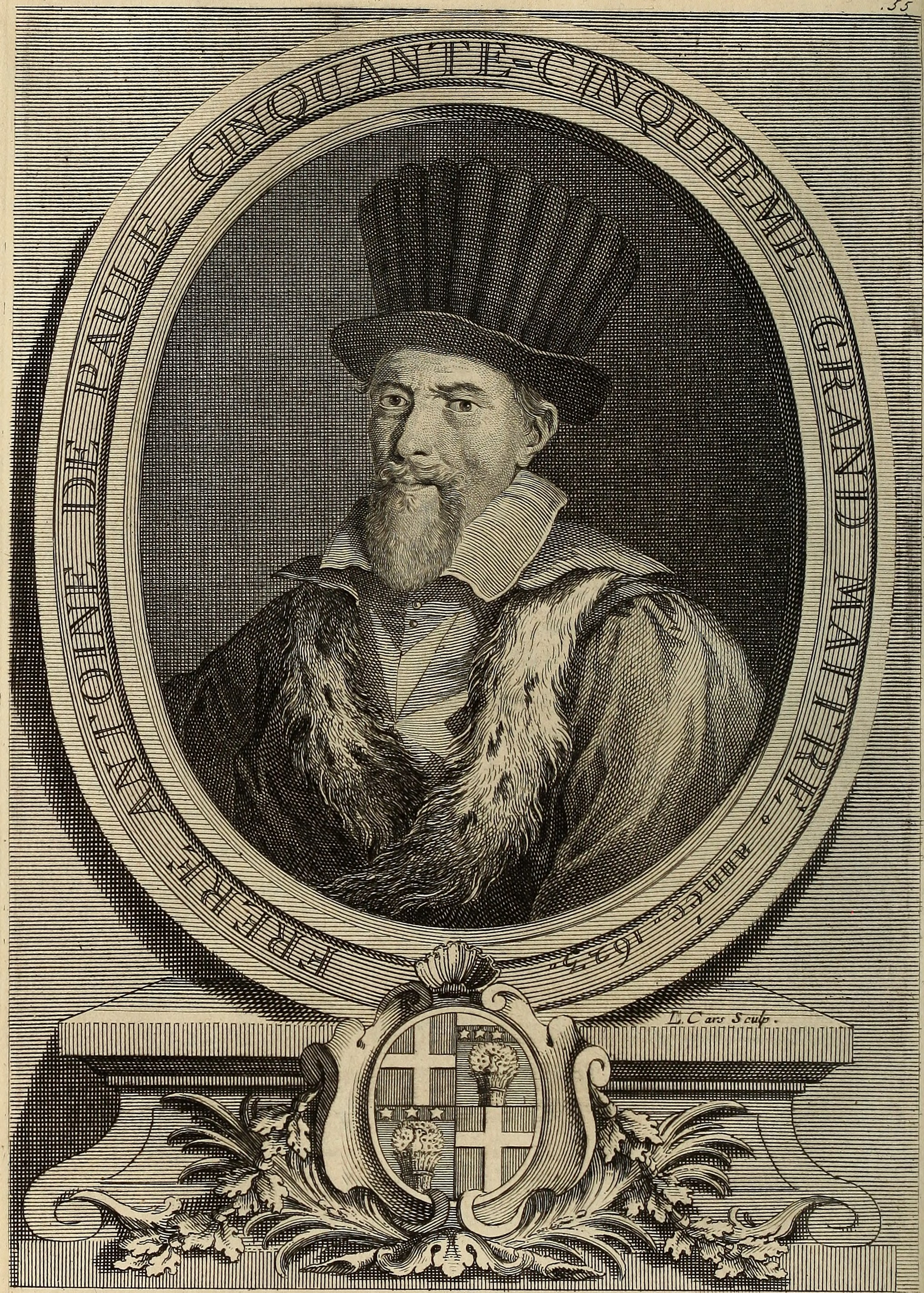

Grand Master of the Order of Saint John
- In office 10 March 1623 – 9 June 1636
- Monarch: King Philip III
- Preceded by: Luís Mendes de Vasconcellos
- Succeeded by: Giovanni Paolo Lascaris

Personal details
- Born: c. 1551 Provence, France
- Died: 9 June 1636 Malta
- Resting place: St. John's Co-Cathedral

Military service
- Allegiance: (Sovereign Military Order of Malta) Order of Saint John

Fra' Antoine de Paule (c. 1551 – 9 June 1636) was elected the 56th Grand Master of the Knights Hospitaller (the Order of Malta) on 10 March 1623. He died on Malta thirteen years later, on 9 June 1636, after a long illness and at the age of 85. His epitaph eulogizes him as a leader who both loved his subjects and was loved by them in return. He is said to have made more resources available to the Order, thus strengthening it. He also sought to fortify ramparts which the Order had erected for defense against the Ottoman Empire.

However, de Paule was not without his enemies, some of whom presented a memorial to Pope Urban VIII describing him as "a man of loose life and conversation", "guilty of simony", who had "bought his dignity with money". In response, de Paule sent a delegate to the Vatican to deal with the accusations.

As Grandmaster, de Paule acted as a judge when a once-captured ship was re-captured and the original owner claimed the ship, decided whether to release a galley rower of a captured privateering vessel who was himself earlier captured by the privateers and forced to row, and appointed abbots and priors to various positions, amongst other responsibilities.

The town of Paola, Malta, was named after the Grandmaster, who laid its foundation stone in 1626.

Preceded by Luís Mendes de Vasconcellos	Grand Master of the Knights Hospitaller; 1623–1636	Succeeded by Giovanni Paolo Lascaris
