= Paola, Malta =

Paola Raħal Ġdid Pawla Casal Paola, Casal Nuovo
- Local council
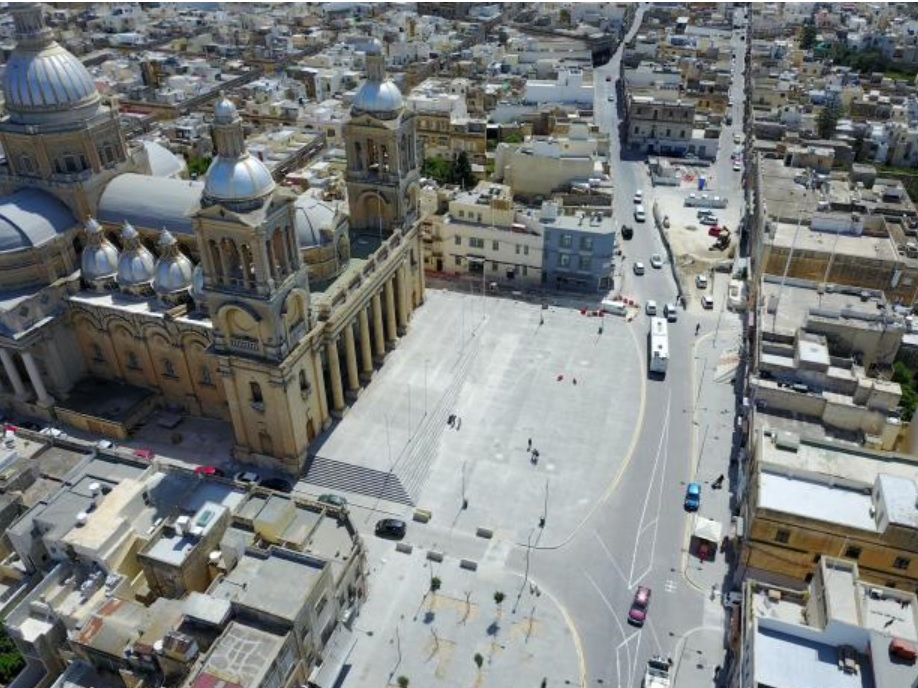
- Antoine de Paule Square and the Basilica of Christ the King

- Flag Coat of arms

- Coordinates: 35°52′22″N 14°30′27″E
- Country: Malta
- Region: Port Region
- District: Southern Harbour District
- Founded: 1626
- Founder: Antoine de Paule
- Borders: Cospicua, Fgura, Luqa, Marsa, Santa Luċija, Tarxien

Government
  - Mayor: Jason Silvio (PL)

Area
  - Total: 2.5 km^{2} (0.97 sq mi)

Population (Jul. 2024)
  - Total: 9,815
  - Density: 3,900/km^{2} (10,000/sq mi)
- Demonyms: Paolites; Pawlist (m), Pawlista (f), Pawlisti (pl)
- Time zone: UTC+1 (CET)
  - Summer (DST): UTC+2 (CEST)
- Postal code: PLA
- Dialing code: 356
- ISO 3166 code: MT-39
- Patron saint: Christ the King; Our Lady of Lourdes
- Day of festa: Last Sunday of July; 1st Sunday after 15 August
- Website: Official website

Paola (Maltese: Raħal Ġdid, Italian: Casal Nuovo, both meaning "New Town") is a town in the Port Region of Malta, with 8,706 inhabitants as of 2019. The town is a commercial centre in the Southern Harbour area of Malta, about 5 km (3.1 mi) from the capital Valletta, contiguous to Tarxien and Fgura, with which it forms a single urban area. Paola is named after Grand Master Antoine de Paule, who laid the foundation stone in 1626.

Paola is renowned for the Ħal Saflieni Hypogeum, the Basilica of Christ the King (the largest church in the Maltese Islands), Antoine de Paule Square and its shopping centres, the Good Friday procession, and its football club, Hibernians FC. The Mariam Al-Batool Mosque, the only mosque in Malta, as well as an Islamic Cultural Centre are found in Paola. The country's correctional facilities (Corradino prison) and the largest burial grounds, the Addolorata Cemetery are also within the limits of Paola.

There are two parish churches, one dedicated to Christ the King and the other to Our Lady of Lourdes. The feast of Christ the King is celebrated on the last Sunday of July and Our Lady of Lourdes is celebrated on the first Sunday after 17 August. The parish also has a Franciscan church dedicated to Saint Anthony, in the Għajn Dwieli zone of the parish. St Ubaldesca Church is the oldest church in Paola and was the first parish church there. In 2008 the church underwent minimal restoration. Villa Perellos, named after grand master Ramon Perellos y Roccaful, is a local historical landmark.

When the Order of St John came to Malta, a big part from Paola to Birmula, was named all Birmula but they changed them to 3 towns. A big part named Fgura and another big part, near dock 6 became Paola.

== History ==
=== Prehistory ===
Although Paola was founded in the 17th century, several megalithic remains have been found within the locality. Several other remains from pre-history to classic antiquity also remain in Paola.

==== The Hypogeum ====
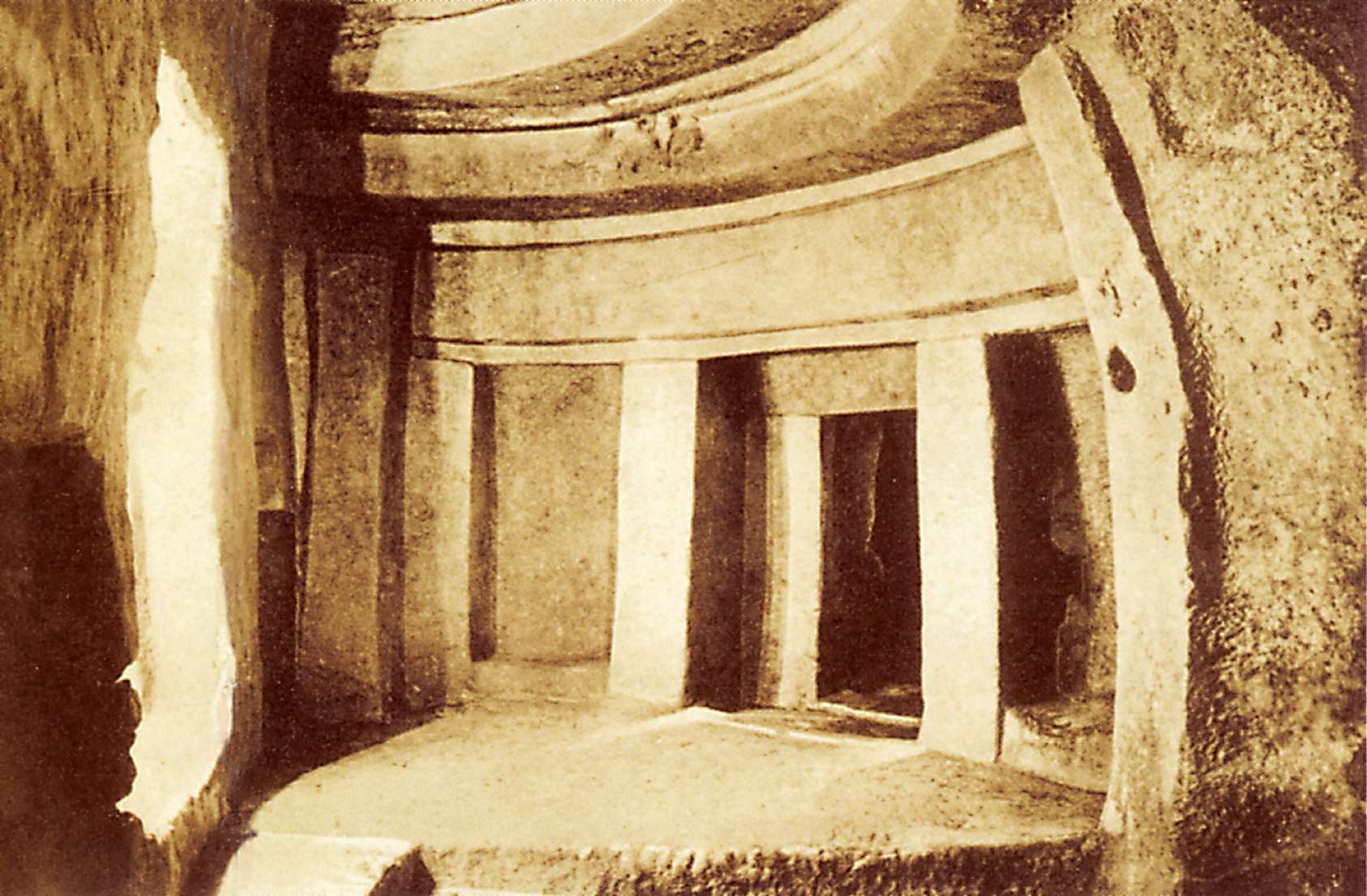
The Ħal Saflieni Hypogeum

The Hypogeum has been designated a UNESCO World Heritage Site. The Hypogeum is a large complex of rooms hewn out of the limestone about 11 metres (36 ft) below the surface. It appears to have been used as a burial site, and also as a temple. Neolithic man carved out the Hypogeum using only antlers and stone picks as tools, and in semi darkness. The Hypogeum is made up of three levels, which are superimposed upon each other. The upper level resembles the earlier rock-cut tombs found elsewhere on the Islands. The middle level, hewn out during the temple period (3800 - 2500 B.C.) is made up of numerous chambers. Many statuettes, amulets, figurines and vases were recovered here. The most famous figurine is that of the so-called Sleeping Lady, a reclining figurine, perhaps meant as a representation of eternal sleep. It is on display at the National Museum of Archaeology, Valletta

==== Kordin Temples ====
The Kordin Temples were located on a high plain that overlooks the Grand Harbour:

- Kordin I – The temple was excavated in part by A.A. Caruana, and later by Sir Themistocles Zammit in 1908 and finished by T. Ashby and T.E. Peet in 1909. It was poorly preserved and consisted of small and irregular rooms. Kordin I was left open to the elements. Bombings during the Second World War and construction on the site have obliterated all of the remains.
- Kordin II – The temple was first investigated by Cesare Vassallo in 1840. A.A. Caruana started to excavate the site properly in 1892. The excavation was continued by Albert Mayer in 1901 and finished by Ashby and Peet in their campaign of 1908–9. The chronology was difficult to figure out, and whether all of the building could be dated to the temple period is debatable. Kordin II must have been in use during the entire temple period since pottery throughout this period's phases were found during its excavation. Kordin II was damaged by the air bombardments of the Second World War and the new buildings that were constructed since.
- Kordin III – This is the only temple on Kordin still in existence today, and it is of the standard Ġgantija-phase 3-apse design. It is the only temple whose forecourt, which is in front of the concave façade, has a stone pavement, as is the entrance passage leading to the central court. Behind the temple and contemporary with it, are small rooms possibly used for storerooms or the like, or even an irregular, lobed minor temple. One of the most noted feature of Kordin III is the 2.75-metre-long 'trough' lying across the entrance to the left apse. It has seven deep transverse grooves produced by grinding. It is made of hard limestone brought from over 2 kilometres away so it is highly probable that it is for grinding corn (a multiple quern) and contemporary with the temple rather than for grinding 'deffun', the traditional Maltese roofing material, which would make it considerably more recent. Kordin III is in a walled area next to the Church of St. Anthony and is kept locked to give it maximum protection.

=== Order of St. John ===
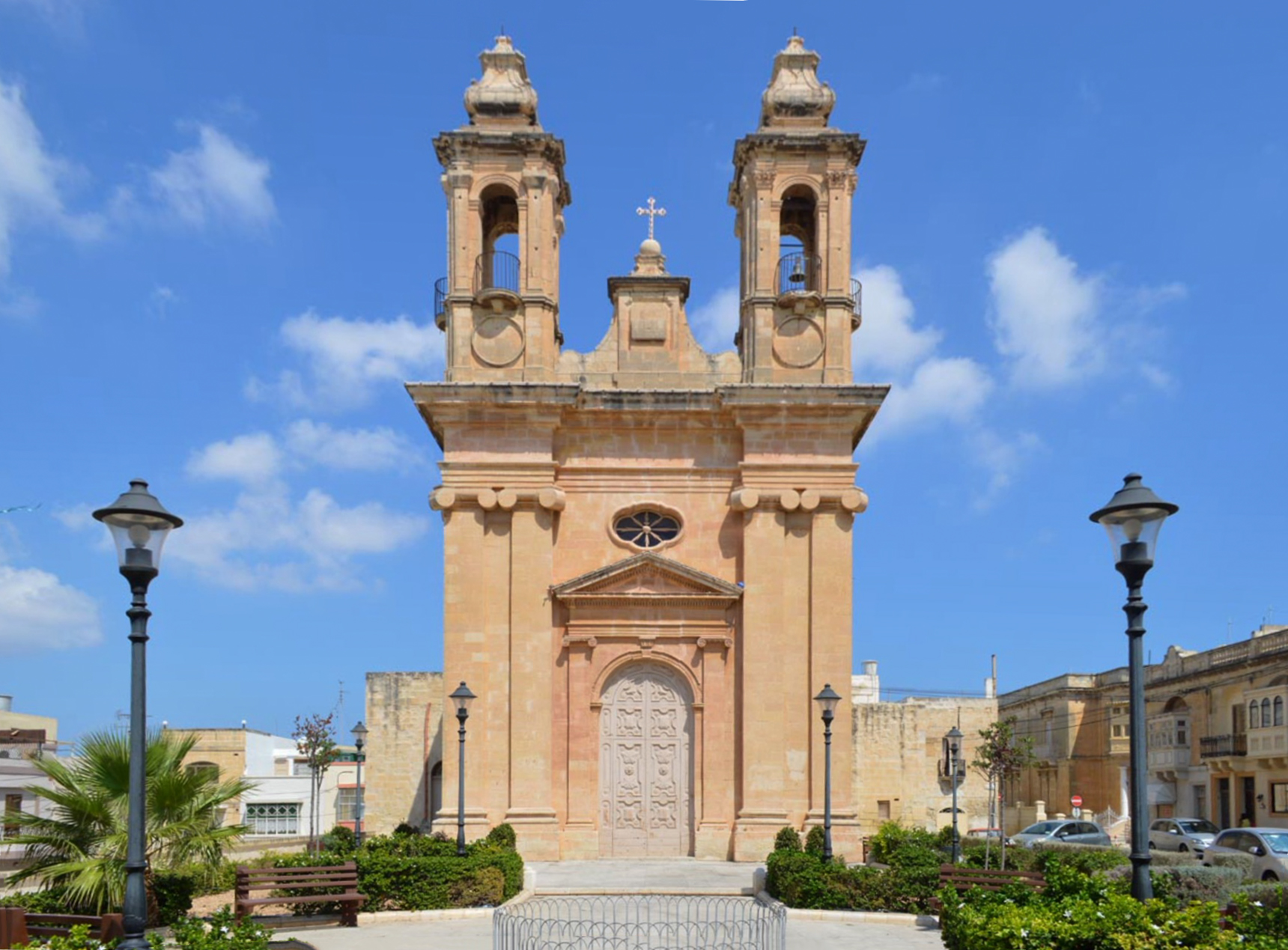
St Ubaldesca Church, Paola

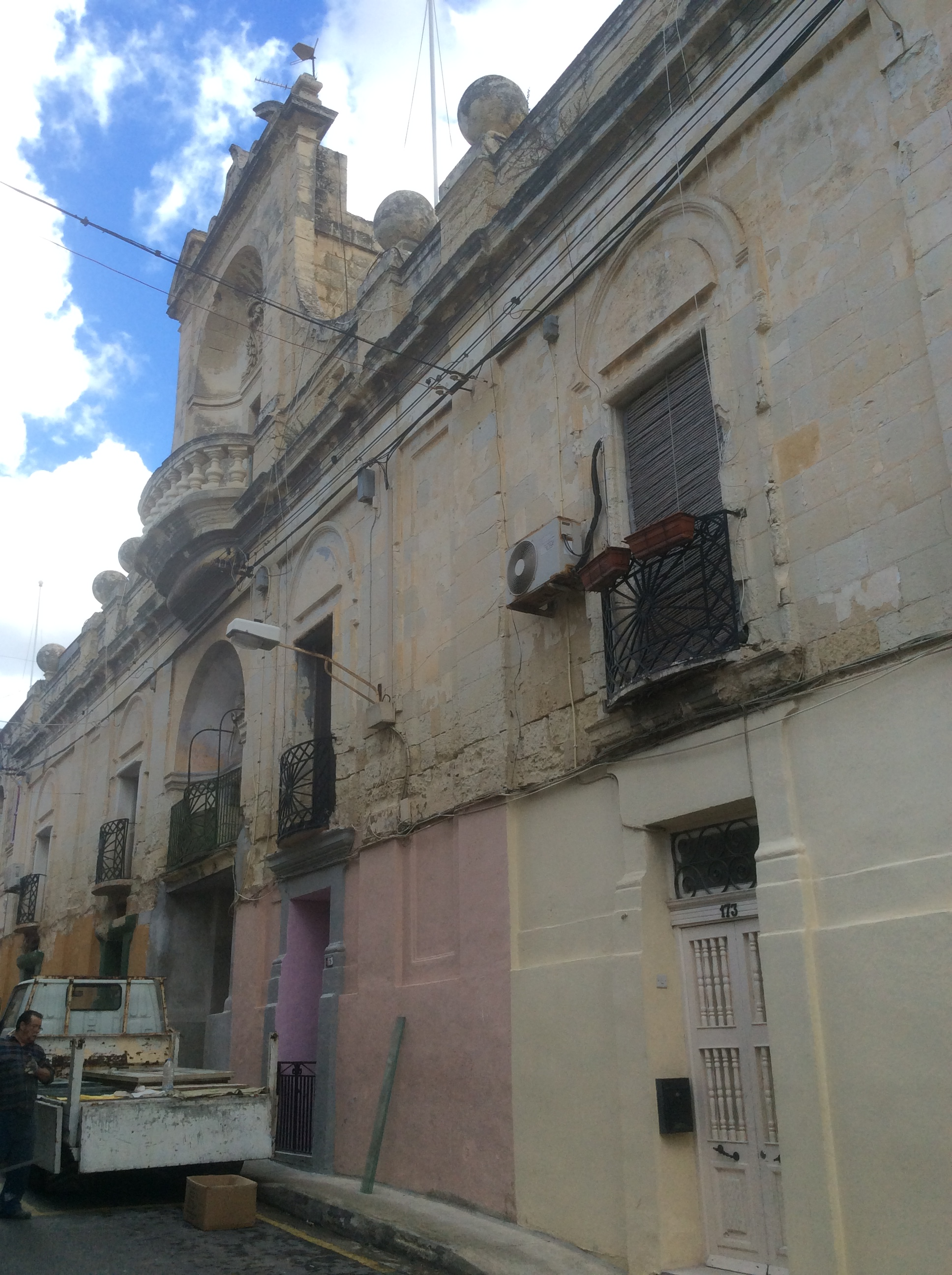
Villa Perellos

The town is named after Grand Master Antoine de Paule, who laid the foundation stone in 1626. De Paule was appointed Grand Master of the Order of St. John on 10 March 1623, when he was 71 years old. On 20 July 1626, to address a growing population, he set up a new town on the hill known as Tal-Għerien (literally: of the caves) which was named Casal Nuovo (meaning: new town) since it was founded during the rule of the Order. The town was later named Casal Paola to bear the family name of the Grand Master. To present date, the town is still referred to by this name. The town's coat of arms originally consisted of a white and red octagonal cross contrasted against a white and red background. During the Military Order, the town became the spiritual successor of the neighbouring town Tarxien and still depended for military tactics by the Chief of Army of Żejtun.

To encourage migration to Paola, de Paule gave indemnity to the debts of the families who moved there.

During his rule, De Paule built a church in the town, dedicated to St. Ubaldesca who was a Sister of the Order of St. John, and this church was the first parish church of the town. Pope Urbanus VIII issued a bull that gave permission for this church to be built. This papal bull was issued from the Basilica of Santa Maria Maggiore in Rome on 31 July 1629. An extract from this bull reads as follows: "we accept this request and to the afore mentioned Antonius, with the Apostolic authority granted by this bull, we give the authority that in the mentioned town in a location of his preference, as long as it is comfortable and just, a church can be built in honour of the afore-mentioned Saint." On 12 November 1629, the Council of the Order of St. John decided to effect what was written on the bull. The laying of the first foundation stone of this church was celebrated in grand style by Grand Master de Paule himself on Sunday 25 August 1630.

"On the day of Sunday, the 25th day of the month of August 1630, which is the feast of the king Saint Ludovico, the Most Serene and the Most Revered Grand Master Fra Antoine de Paule went to the town, which for the past four years had taken the name of his family and which was established in the land of Marsa, and he was accompanied by numerous Venerable Gran Cruci as well as by numerous brethren from our Order and in front of a crowd of people he laid the first stone of the church which was to be built for the grace of God and the Holy Virgin Ubaldesca, sister of our Religion, with the permission of the Most Reverend Prior of the church, Fra Salvatur Imbroll, who was adorned with pontifical clothes and according to the rites of the Holy Roman Church. This was done with the apolostic authority given by the Magnificent His Holiness from Santa Maria Maggiore in Rome, on the 31st of July 1629 and which was written in the public deed of the Notary Lorenzo Grima."

As accounted by Giovanni de Soldanis, in 1750 Paola was not yet its own parish, as it fell under the parish of Tarxien.

=== British and contemporary period ===
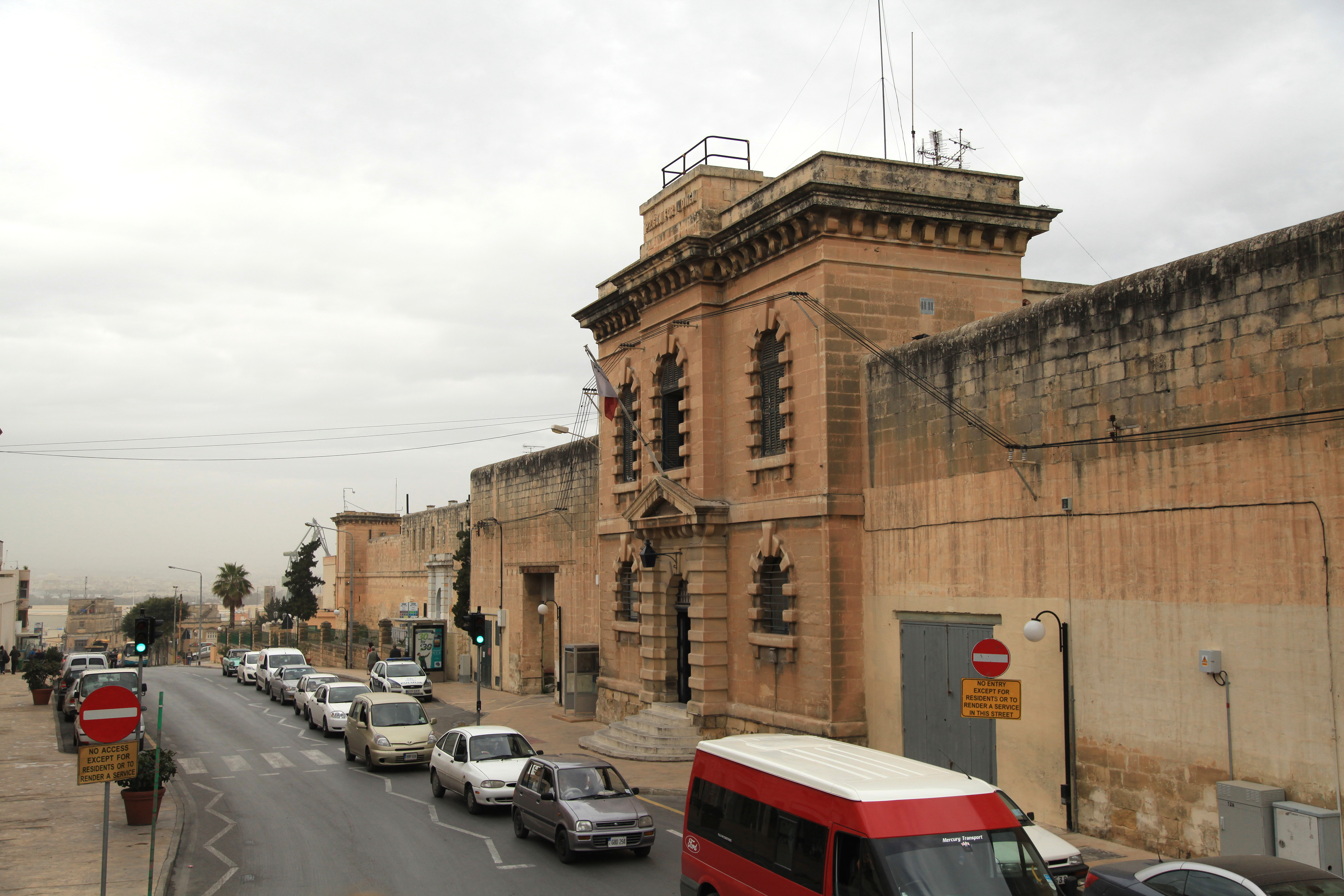
Corradino prison, Paola

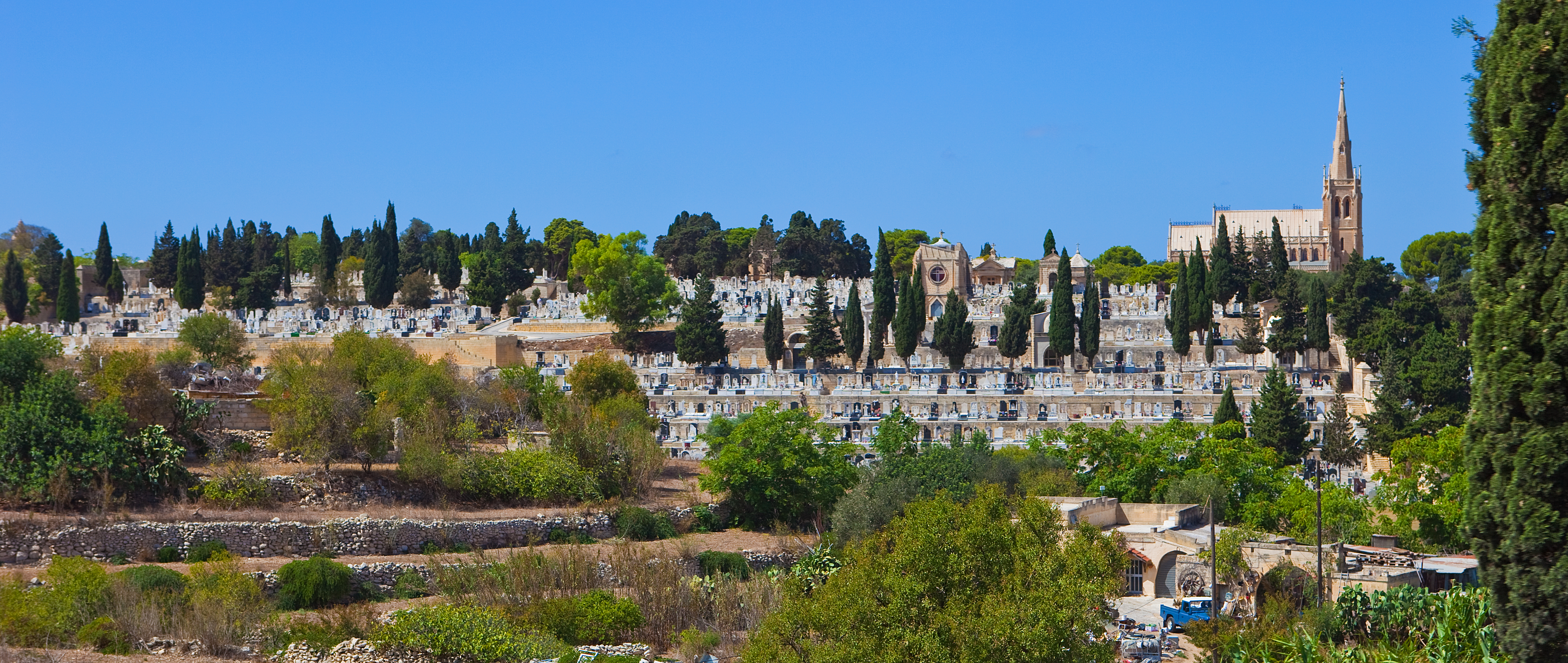
Addolorata Cemetery and Chapel

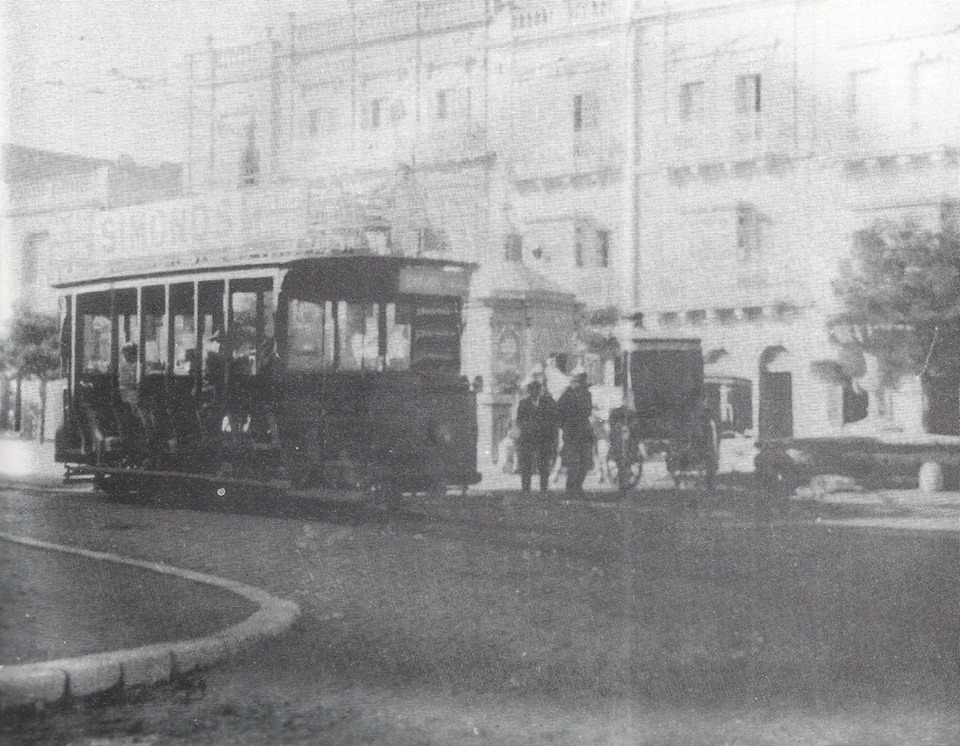
Malta Tramways in Paola Square (1905 to 1929)

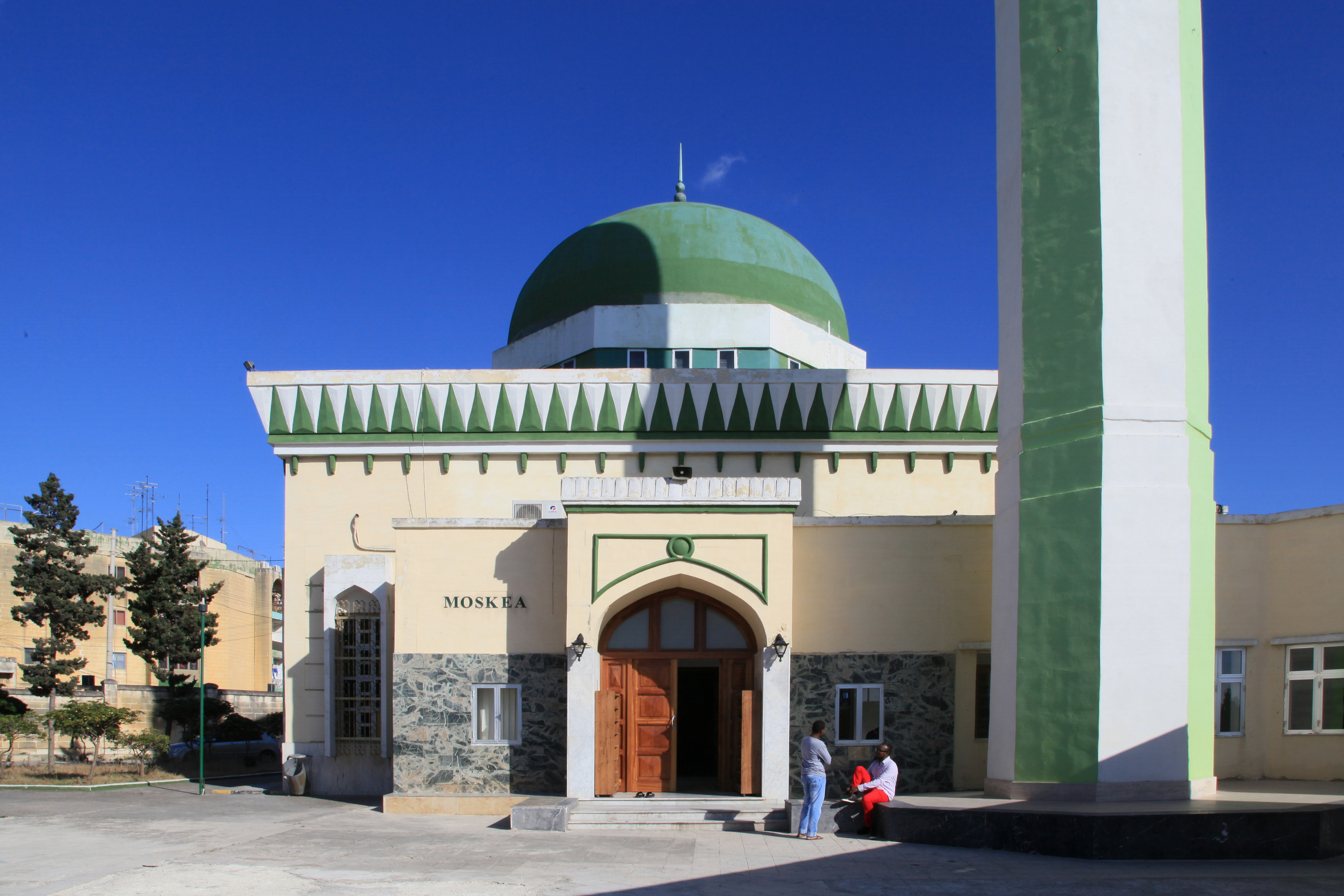
Mariam Al-Batool Mosque, Paola

At the start of the British colonial period, Paula was almost deserted due to malaria rising from the marshes at Marsa. These marshes were drained by Captain Frederick Hunn, as well as by Francesco Zammit, a local entrepreneur who got in exchange the ownership of the newly dried lands, thus becoming by the 1830s the richest man in Malta. The end of malaria brought back population and wealth to Paola too.

In 1842 the British administration built the Corradino prison in Paola on the model of the Pentonville prison in London, with a capacity of 200 prisoners divided into 4 wings. Now fully surrounded by Paola's urban area, Corradino remains Malta's main correctional facility to date.

In 1862-1868 the new main resting place in Malta, the Addolorata Cemetery, was built on a hill known as Tal-Ħorr which was already a burial ground since prehistoric times. The cemetery and the chapel were built in a neo-gothic design based on designs by architect Emanuele Luigi Galizia, and opened on May 9, 1869. The first burial took place on January 23, 1872. The cemetery was further extended in the 1970s, and is full of old Mausoleums and statues in marble and bronze.

From 1905 to 1929, Paola Square hosted a stop of the Malta Tramways line from Valletta to Cospicua.

The St Ubaldesca Church was enlarged in 1900 to accommodate the growing population, and Paola became a parish in 1910, when it was dedicated to the Sacred Heart of Jesus. A new and larger church, the Basilica of Christ the King, was eventually built to replace it in Antoine de Paule Square, the town's main square; it started to be used in 1936 and was consecrated and dedicated on June 3, 1967, by Archbishop Mikiel Gonzi. Since then, the church has undergone restoration and its interior is adorned with gold guilding and a niche holding the parish's titular statue of Christ the King. In April 2020 it was raised to the dignity of a minor basilica.

Paola also hosts the only mosque in Malta, the Mariam Al-Batool Mosque, whose first stone was laid by Muammar Gaddafi in 1978 and its doors were open to the public in 1982, and officiated in 1984. The complex also includes the Mariam Al-Batool School, the Islamic Cultural Centre (Ċentru Kulturali Islamiku), a courtyard, the Malta Islamic Cemetery (Iċ-Ċimiterju Islamiku f'Malta) and the Mediterranean Garden.

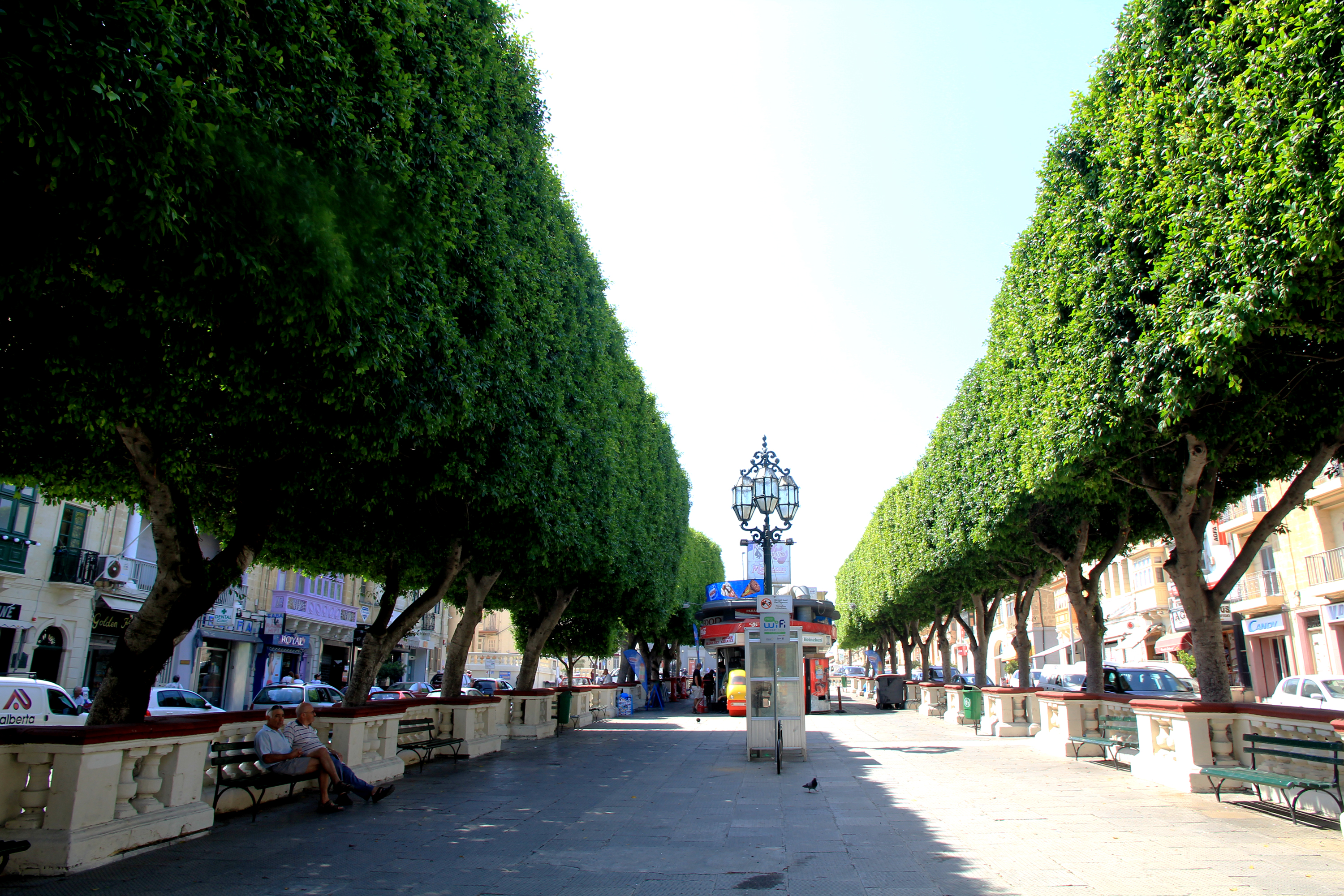
Pjazza Antoine de Paole before renovation and removal of the trees

Since the 1960s until 2018, Pjazza Antoine de Paole (Paola Square) included a central pedestrian space, with a kiosk shaded by trees. In 2015, the Government of Malta entrusted architect Christopher Mintoff (nephew of Dom Mintoff) with a €3 million project for the regeneration of the square. Despite being presented as aimed at the creation of an "urban garden", the project entailed uprooting all the mature trees on the square. The architect justified this as the roots were damaging the underground infrastructure and the sappy spores of the ficus trees were making the floor filthy and attracting insects. The works proceeded with delays throughout 2017, although the square was not fully pedestrianised due to pressures from local shop-owners. Residents complained that the mature trees had been replaced with saplings, unable to provide the same shade.

== Demographics ==
The population of Paola was 9,815 in July 2024. This included 5,538 males and 4,277 females; 7,184 Maltese nationals and 2,631 foreign nationals.

== Band clubs ==
- Soċjeta' Filarmonika 11 ta' Frar- Madonna ta' Lourdes
- De Paule Philharmonic Society Christ the King Band (Is-Soċjetà Filarmonika De Paule Banda Kristu Re) (tal-Ħomor)
- Christ the King Band Club (Ghaqda Socjali w Muzikali Kristu Sultan Banda Paola) (tal-Ħodor)

== Zones ==
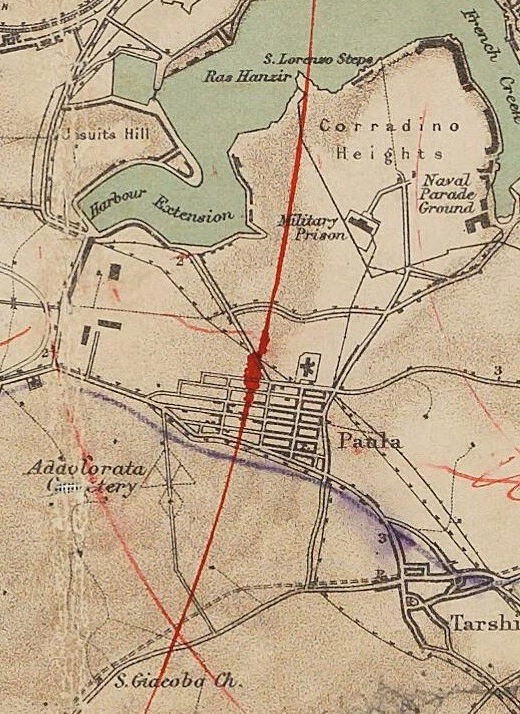
Paola in 1895

- Għajn Dwieli
- Il-Qortin
- Kordin (Corradino)
- Moll il-Faħam
- L-Ordinanza
- Ras Ħanżir
- Tal-Borġ
- Tax-Xewk

== Government ==
Transport Malta has an office in the A3 Towers.

== Main roads ==
- Pjazza Antone De Paule (Paola Square)
- Telgħat Raħal Ġdid (Paola Hill)
- Triq Bormla (Cospicua Road)
- Triq Għajn Dwieli (Għajn Dwieli Road)
- Triq Ħal Luqa (Luqa Road)
- Triq Ħal Tarxien (Tarxien Road)
- Triq Ħaż-Żabbar (Żabbar Road)
- Vjal Kristu Re (Christ the King Avenue) - formerly called Triq il-Belt Valletta (Valletta Road)
- Triq il-Perit Dom Mintoff (Dom Mintoff Road) - formerly called Triq Kordin (Corradino Road)
- Triq l-Isqof Buhagiar (Bishop Buhagiar Street)
- Triq Lampuka (Lampuka Street)
- Triq Sammat (Sammat Street)
- Vjal Santa Luċija (Santa Lucia Avenue)
- Vjal Sir Pawlu Boffa (Sir Paul Boffa Avenue)
- Triq Palma (Palm Street)
- Triq l-Arkata (Arcade Street)

== Notable people ==
- Sir Paul Boffa (1890–1962), Prime Minister, resided in this locality
- Agostino Bonello (born 1949), international movie art director
- Chris Fearne (born 1963), Deputy Prime Minister and Minister for Health
- Bernard Grech (born 1971), leader of the Opposition and the Maltese Nationalist Party, was born in this locality
- Immanuel Mifsud (born 1967), author, winner of the European Union Prize for Literature in 2011

== Twin towns – sister cities ==
Paola is twinned with:

- Calcinaia, Italy
- Saint Alban, France
