= Calcinaia =

- Comune
- Comune di Calcinaia
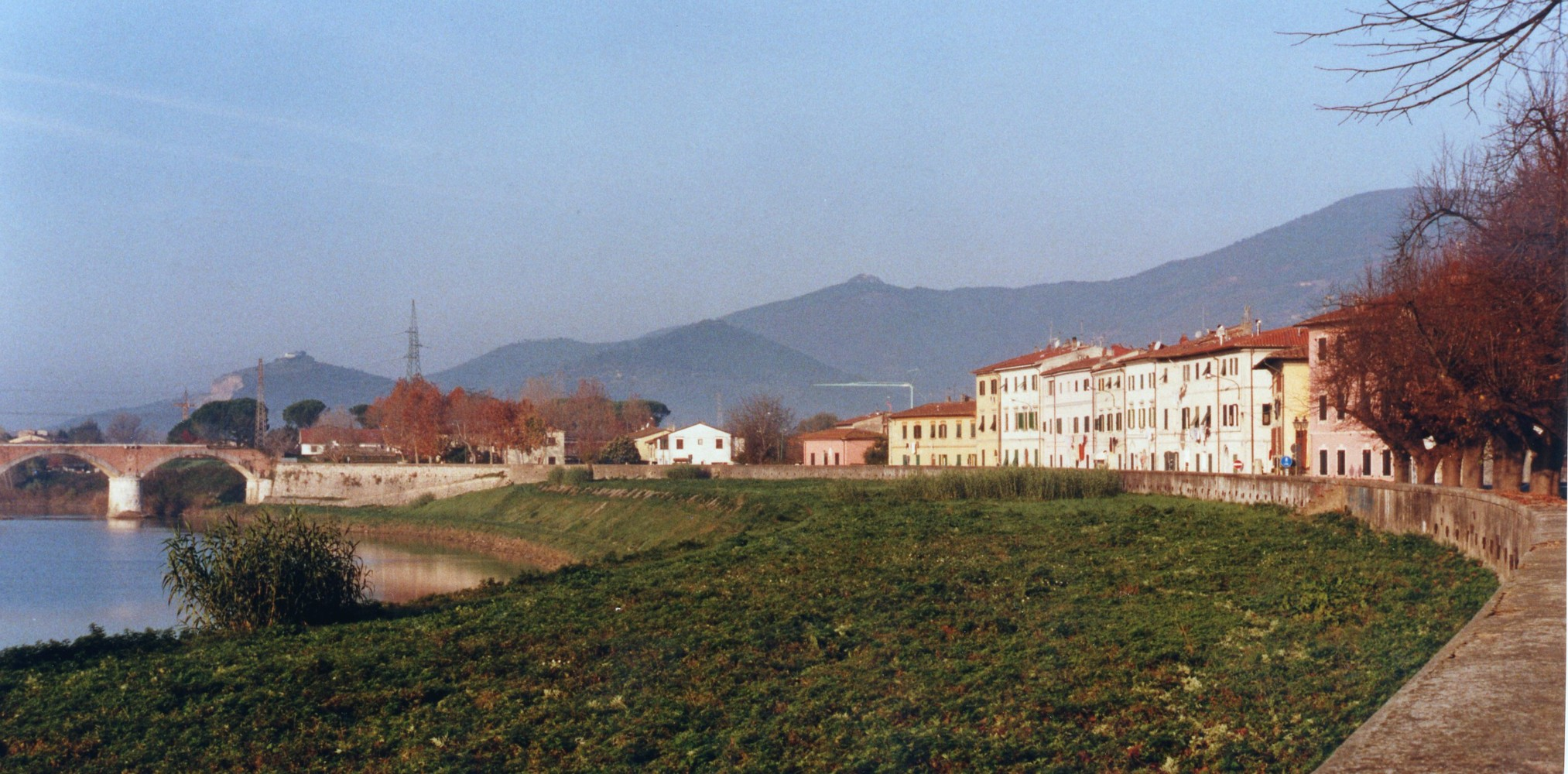

- Coat of arms

- Location within Italy Location within Tuscany
- Coordinates: 43°41′N 10°37′E
- Country: Italy
- Region: Tuscany
- Province: Pisa (PI)
- Frazioni: Fornacette

Government
  - Mayor: Cristiano Alderigi

Area
  - Total: 15.0 km^{2} (5.8 sq mi)
- Elevation: 16 m (52 ft)

Population (1 January 2016)
  - Total: 12,439
  - Density: 829/km^{2} (2,150/sq mi)
- Demonym: Calcinaioli
- Time zone: UTC+1 (CET)
  - Summer (DST): UTC+2 (CEST)
- Postal code: 56012
- Dialing code: 0587
- Website: Official website

Calcinaia (Latin: Vicus Vitri) is a comune (municipality) and town in the province of Pisa in the Italian region Tuscany, located about 50 kilometres (31 mi) west of Florence and about 20 kilometres (12 mi) east of Pisa.

Calcinaia borders the following municipalities: Bientina, Cascina, Pontedera, Santa Maria a Monte, Vicopisano. The town of Fornacette is included in the municipality of Calcinaia.

== History ==
Calcinaia was founded before the year 1000 on the right bank of the Arno River as Vico Vitri, the current name being attested from 1193. At the time it was a fief of the counts of Fucecchio, later replaced by the Upezzinghi Ghibelline family of Pisa.

Contended for centuries by the Republics of Pisa and Lucca, it was later conquered by Florence in the 15th century. In 1555 Grand Duke Cosimo I de' Medici had hydraulic works built here to regulate the floods of the Arno, a move which boosted agriculture in the area.

In the district of Sardina, the chapel of St. Stephen is the major attraction.

== Twin towns ==
- Vilanova del Camí, Spain
- Noves, France
- Amilly, France

Calcinaia has also signed friendship agreements with:

- Hopsten, Germany
- Paola, Malta
