= Buses in Malta =

Buses used for public transport on Malta

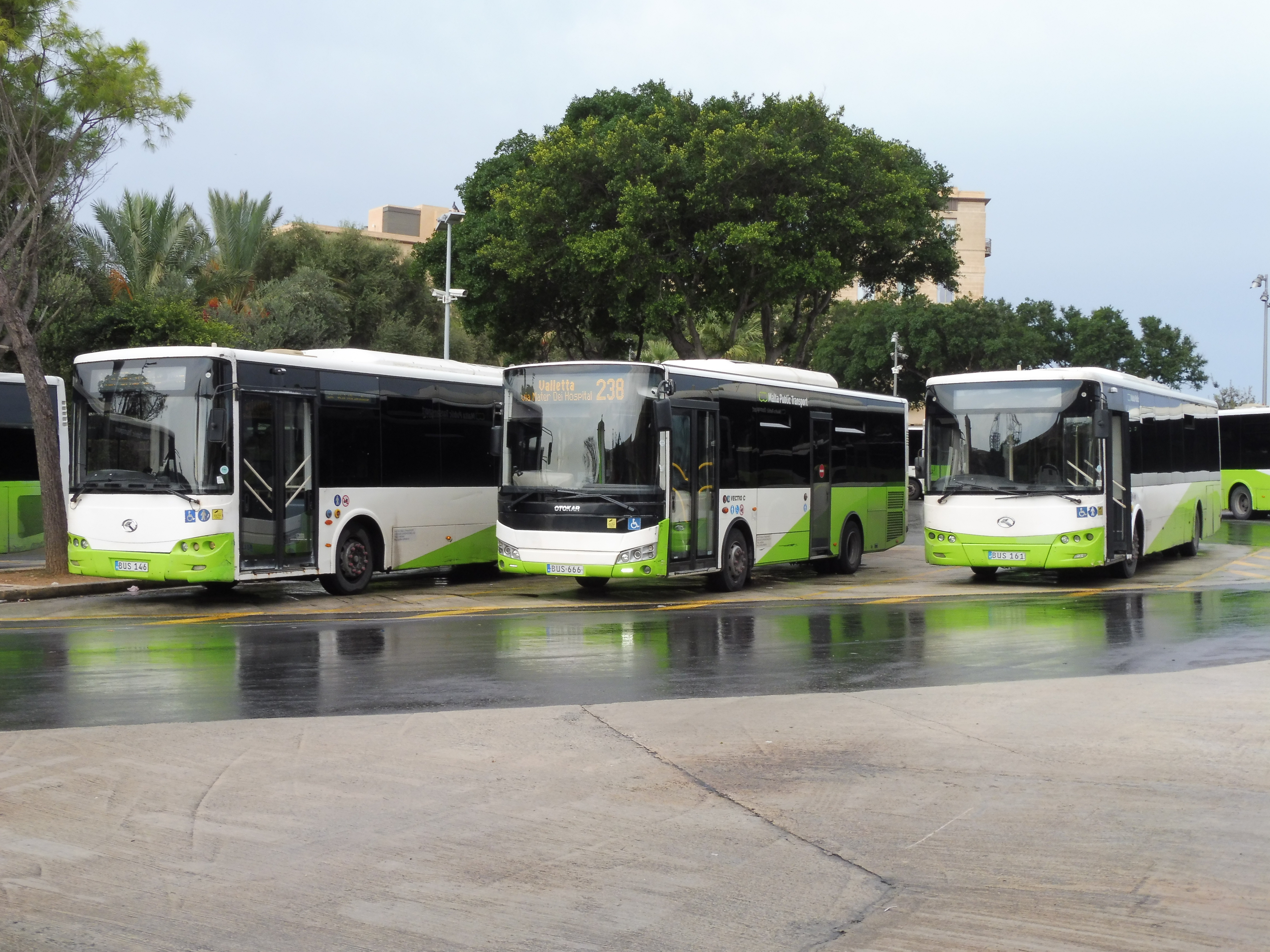
Malta Public Transport buses in 2019

Buses were introduced to Malta in 1905. Up until 2011, the traditional Malta bus (Maltese: xarabank or karozza tal-linja) served as a popular tourist attraction for its unique appearances. By the end of this operation, Malta had several unserviceable buses.

The unique nature of the Malta bus stemmed from the tradition of local ownership by the drivers. The buses' unique appearances, full of details and decorations, were from a practice of in-house maintenance. This included rebuilding or modifying the bus bodies in local workshops. As a result, the buses served as popular tourist attractions. Newer Malta buses were continuously introduced to meet rising tourism, which followed modern standard bus designs found in other parts of the world. The practice of customisation still continued for these newer buses as well.

On 3 July 2011, the network of service bus routes across Malta was taken over by Arriva, with traditional buses reduced to operating on only special heritage services. Arriva introduced a fleet of modern low-floor buses, which were imported secondhand ex-London articulated Mercedes-Benz Citaros. These low-floor buses from the old fleet were retained and repainted in Arriva colours. Arriva also purchased a fleet of brand new King Long rigid buses.

Arriva's operation in Malta was beset by problems. Three fires within a 48-hour period in August 2013 prompted the Maltese government to ban the Citaros buses from operation in the country pending an investigation. Arriva's operation in Malta continued until 1 January 2014, when the nation's bus network was nationalised as Malta Public Transport. On 8 January 2015, Malta Public Transport was reprivatised as it was sold to Autobuses Urbanos de León, an Alsa subsidiary which retained the Malta Public Transport brand name. The company doubled the bus fleet, which now consists of more than 400 buses.

Malta Public Transport has invested extensively in modernising its bus fleet to make it safer, more environmentally friendly, and comfortable. The company invested in 200 new buses that utilise Euro 6 diesel technology. The buses are cleaned and maintained regularly, and are equipped with air-conditioning systems. All new buses have two doors to facilitate boarding and alighting of passengers.

Public transport – including buses – has been free in Malta and Gozo since October 2022 to everyone who has a Tallinja Card. Anyone who resides on these islands can register for a Tallinja Card. A Tallinja Card requires proof of residency on the islands and a one time fee of €5 to €25 depending on the type of card, e.g. child, student, adult etc.

== Original bus system (1905–2011) ==
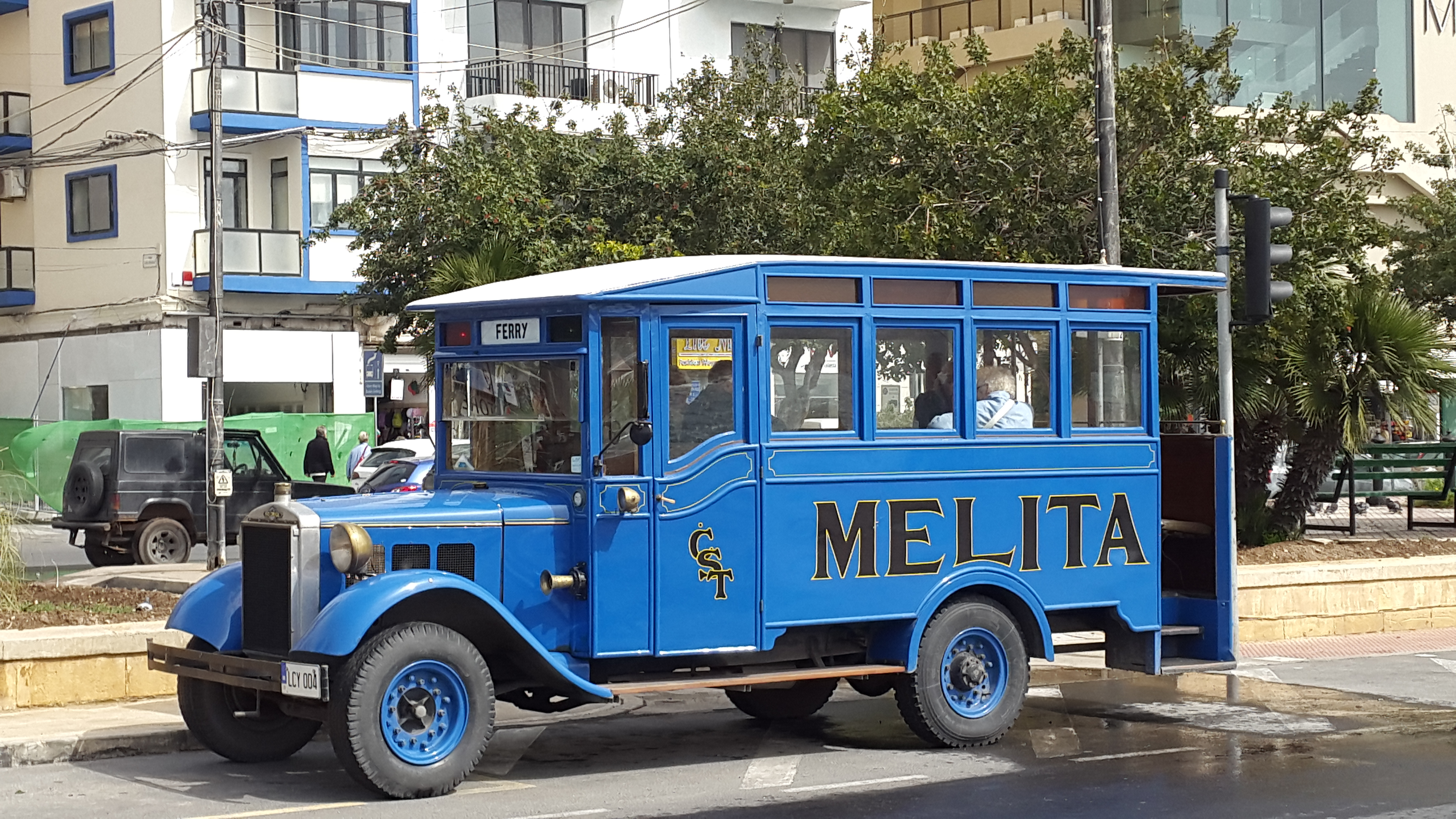
One of Malta's first buses that was bought in 1921 by the Cottonera Motor Bus Company. It is still in use today as a tourist attraction.

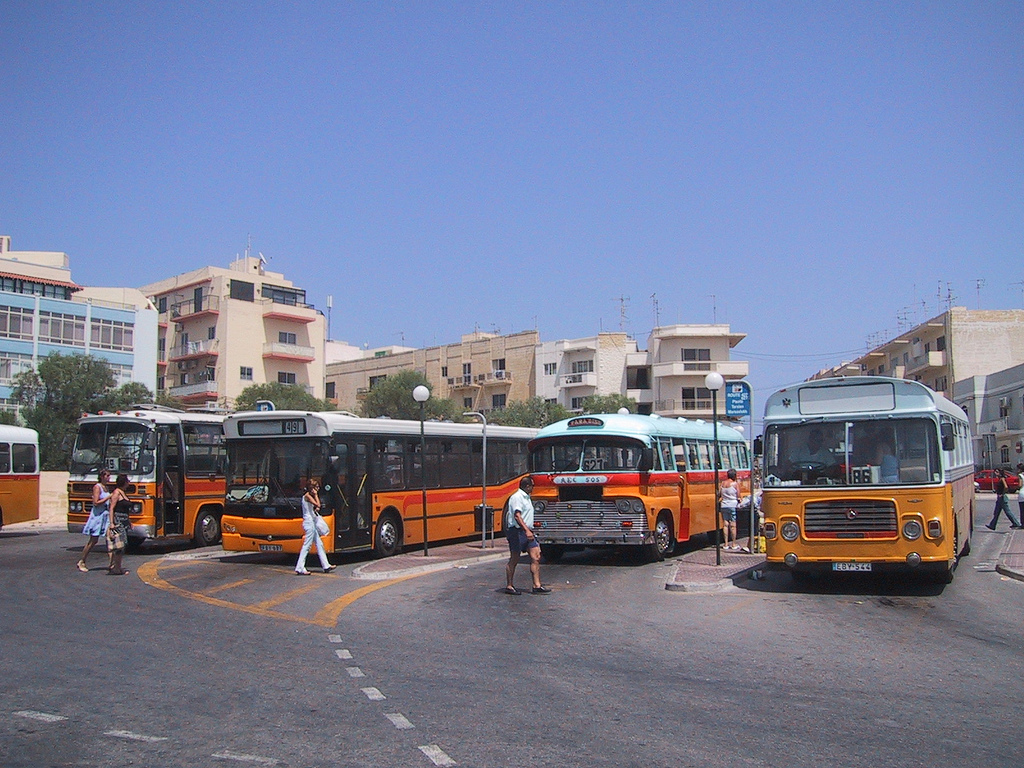
Malta buses at Bugibba terminus. (L-R): a Bedford/Duple Dominant coach (with bus seats), low floor modern BMC Falcon bus, classic Leyland Comet/Aqualina bus and Bristol/ECW bus.

=== History ===
The first buses were imported to Malta in 1905 from Thornycroft in England by Edward Agius of Ed T Agius Ltd (coal shipping). He formed the Malta Motor Omnibus and Transport Syndicate Ltd with his brother-in-law Joseph Muscat to operate the first bus service between Valletta and St Julian's. As early as 1920, bus manufacturing was taking place on the island, with local carpenters and mechanics constructing bus body coachwork for local transport companies.

In the 1920s, operation of buses on public transport routes was subject to open competition between operators, and as such, buses used were not necessarily well turned out. With the formation of the Traffic Control Board in 1931, greater regulation and discipline of the system meant that operators began to upgrade the appearance of their buses. Since then, the tradition of showing pride in the vehicles has been maintained, through decoration and customisation of the buses.

Since reform in the 1970s, bus operation was centralised under a worker cooperative, the Public Transport Association (Maltese: Assoċjazzjoni Trasport Pubbliku (ATP)), in 1977. This association became responsible for the centralised day-to-day operational management of bus services, producing a unified timetable roster and basic livery, although this did not change the ownership arrangements for the buses. The overall transport system was regulated under the Malta Transport Authority (ADT).

In December 2003, in light of over 100 buses being scrapped, a government subsidised tour bus service using traditional Malta buses, as the "VisitMalta bus", was set up by the tourism and transport ministries, although this was withdrawn in April 2005.

While the buses generally remain popular among tourists and nostalgic Maltese, the original system was infamous and unpopular with some parts of the local population who considered the service as inefficient and polluting, driven by drivers who were sometimes very impolite to passengers. This resulted in a significant increase in private car ownership among the population, and today only one in ten trips are made via public transportation. One extreme case to note occurred on 29 June 2010, when a driver attempted to forcibly pull a Spanish tourist out of her seat and off the bus following a row over seven cents in change.

=== Operational system ===
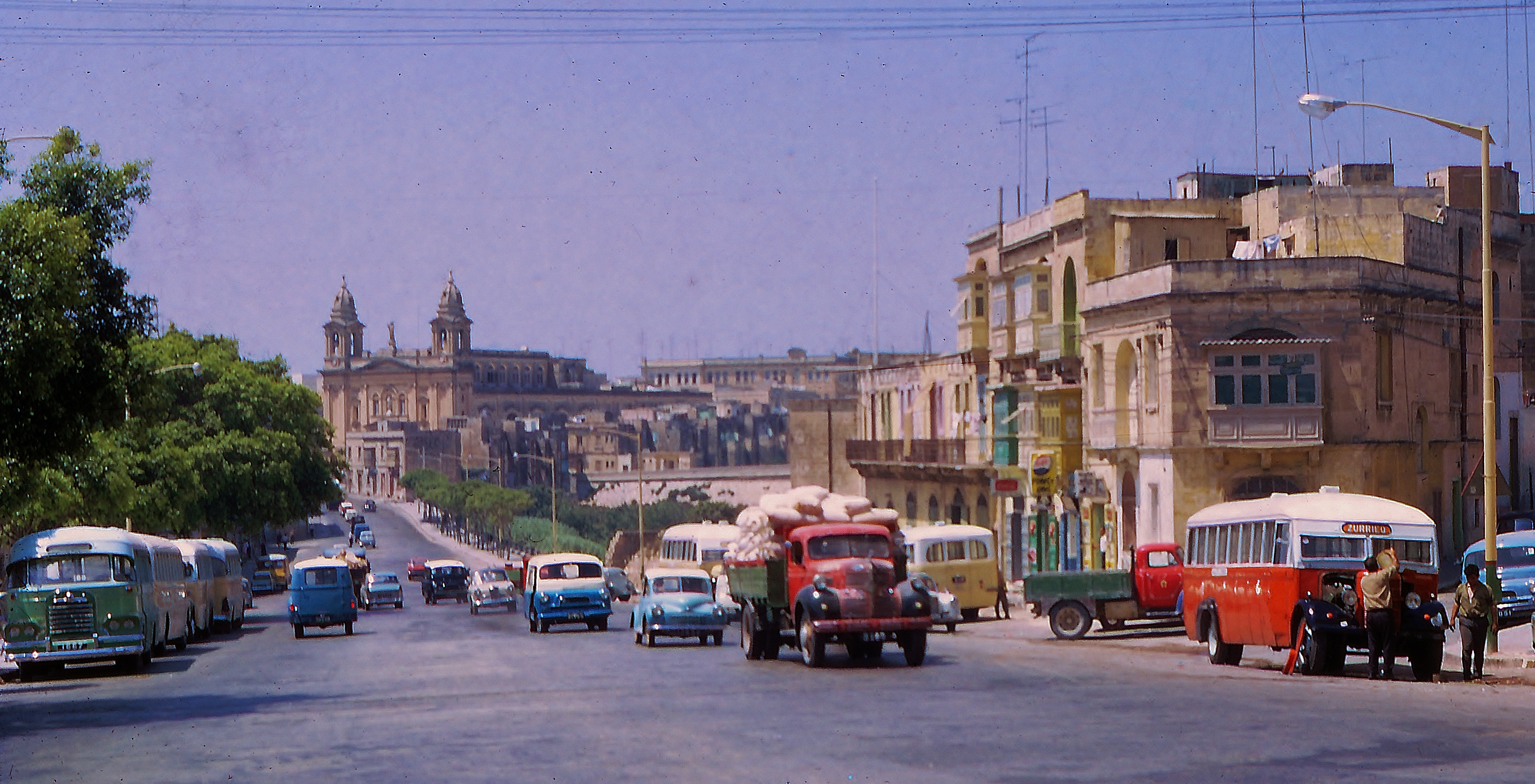
Malta buses in Marsa in 1967

The operation model dated back to a system introduced in 1977. The ATP authority determined the schedules, which were then operated by the private bus owners, who remained responsible for the condition and upkeep of their buses, either as owner operators, or in groups. As such, several buses were kept at the family homes of the drivers in question, or based in small garage locations.

To ensure fair distribution of both good and bad routes, the daily operation of buses was allocated on a rota basis, with buses operating on a 'day on, day off' basis, whereby one day half of the buses operate on the public routes, while the other half were used for private hire, or as school buses, or undergo maintenance.

Malta buses on public transport duties were seen in high concentrations at the main City Gate Square bus terminus at Valletta surrounding the Triton Fountain, from where the vast majority of scheduled routes departed. Other major centres of traffic included Buġibba, St Paul's Bay, Sliema and Mosta.

=== Former liveries and types ===
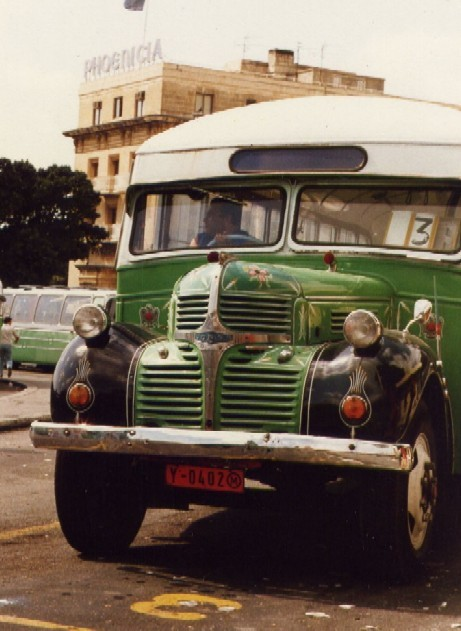
A green Malta bus in 1987

Early buses wore an olive green livery with a black stripe. In the 1930s, buses were painted different colours according to the route they operated. In 1975 buses were painted green, and from 1995 vehicles carried in a yellow (lower) and white (upper) livery, relieved by a red band just below the window line. Gozo buses were painted grey with a red band below the windows.

All Malta buses immediately prior to the 2011 reform were single-deckers, with bus or coach bodies. Early buses did not have many common transit bus features, with route numbers displayed using white cards. Later buses had modern features such as electronic destination displays, but these were still not used to indicate the bus's destination, showing only the number of the route.

Very early types of bus could still be found but no longer in service, with a front engine mounted in an extended bonneted nose, in the style of some conventional trucks. The majority of classic Malta buses had elaborate grilles and headlight arrangements, curved windscreens and sloping roofs. Later makes of bus were usually of conventional bus and coach designs that were in use elsewhere in the world, such as Plaxton Supreme and Duple Dominant bodywork.

Between 1981 and 1987 the fleet was drastically modernised with the import of over 260 second-hand buses from the United Kingdom. Many of the oldest buses in the fleet were further replaced with the influx of 150 new low-floor buses from China and Turkey, financed with government grant aid, leaving just three normal control vehicles.

Second-hand imports from the UK had continued up to 2008, with some of the last examples being Alexander Dash-bodied Volvo B6s deemed surplus after Stagecoach's takeover of Yorkshire Traction. Even with these fleet modernisations, the nearly 500-strong bus fleet still contained some examples dating from the 1950s which remained in operational service as recently as 2011, prior to the bus reform.

== Detailing ==
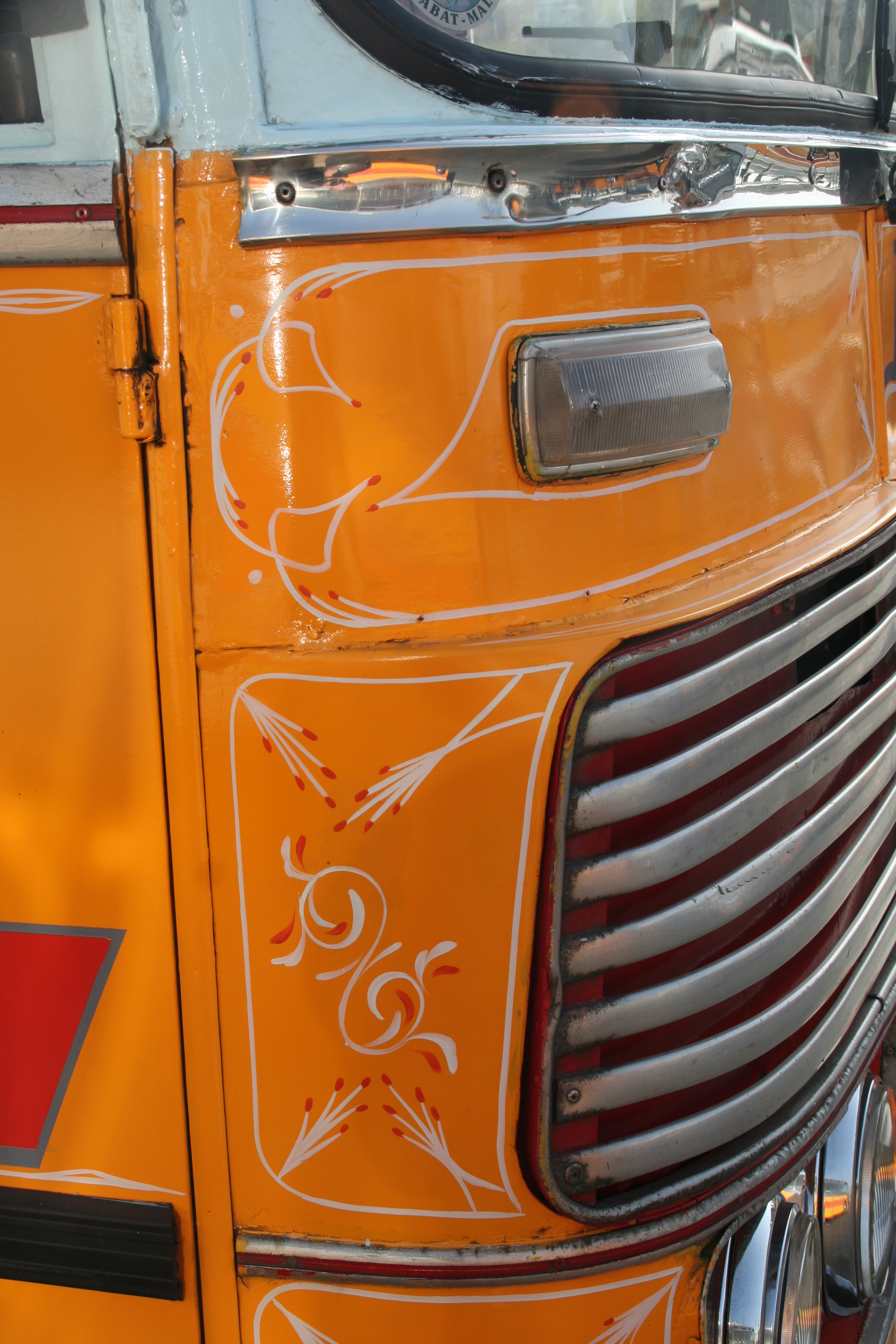
Paint detailing on a Malta bus

Malta buses were characterised by their high level of customisation and detailing. Common additions to former route buses included:

- Increased use chrome parts / high polishing of chrome parts, such as hubcaps and grilles
- Paint detailing, both generally, and of parts such as indicators and filler caps
- Custom passenger messages, both in the interior and exterior of the bus
- Names relating to the village patron saint, monarchs, or other notable objects.
- Trimmings and hangings, especially inside the front window
- Slogans, murals, quotations and lucky images (such as the horseshoe)

Due to the nature of operation of Malta buses, many of the drivers were also mechanics, and a high number of Malta buses proudly displayed the name of the manufacturer of the chassis or body of the bus, or the engine type used. In some instances though, these names are not actually the name of the bus in question.

=== Preservation ===
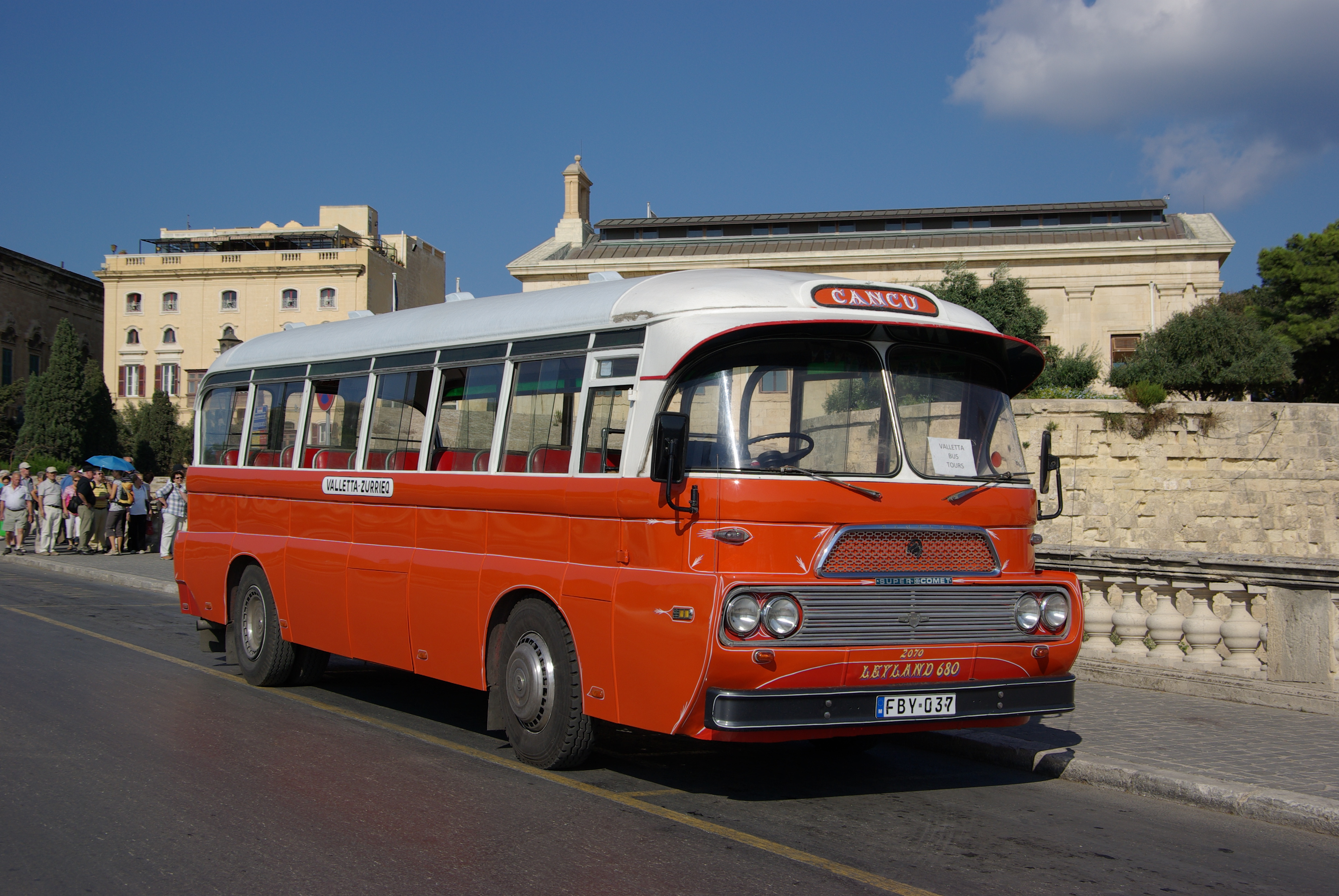
A bus painted in the original colours of the Valletta-Żurrieq route

The preservation organisation Heritage Malta purchased 90 buses after the restructuring of the bus network and is currently in the process of restoring them to their original condition and preserving their customised modifications. These efforts were aided by expertise and parts provided by many of the vehicle's former owners. It is planned that these newly renovated buses will then be exhibited in an industrial heritage museum.

Since 2011, various of the old buses have been repainted in their original pre-1975 colours. A notable example is the Gozo Mail Bus which was painted red with a white stripe.

MaltaPost issued a set of 20 postage stamps to commemorate the withdrawal of service of the traditional Malta buses on 2 July 2011, a day before the restructure. The stamps showed Maltese buses in the different colours which existed for the different routes.

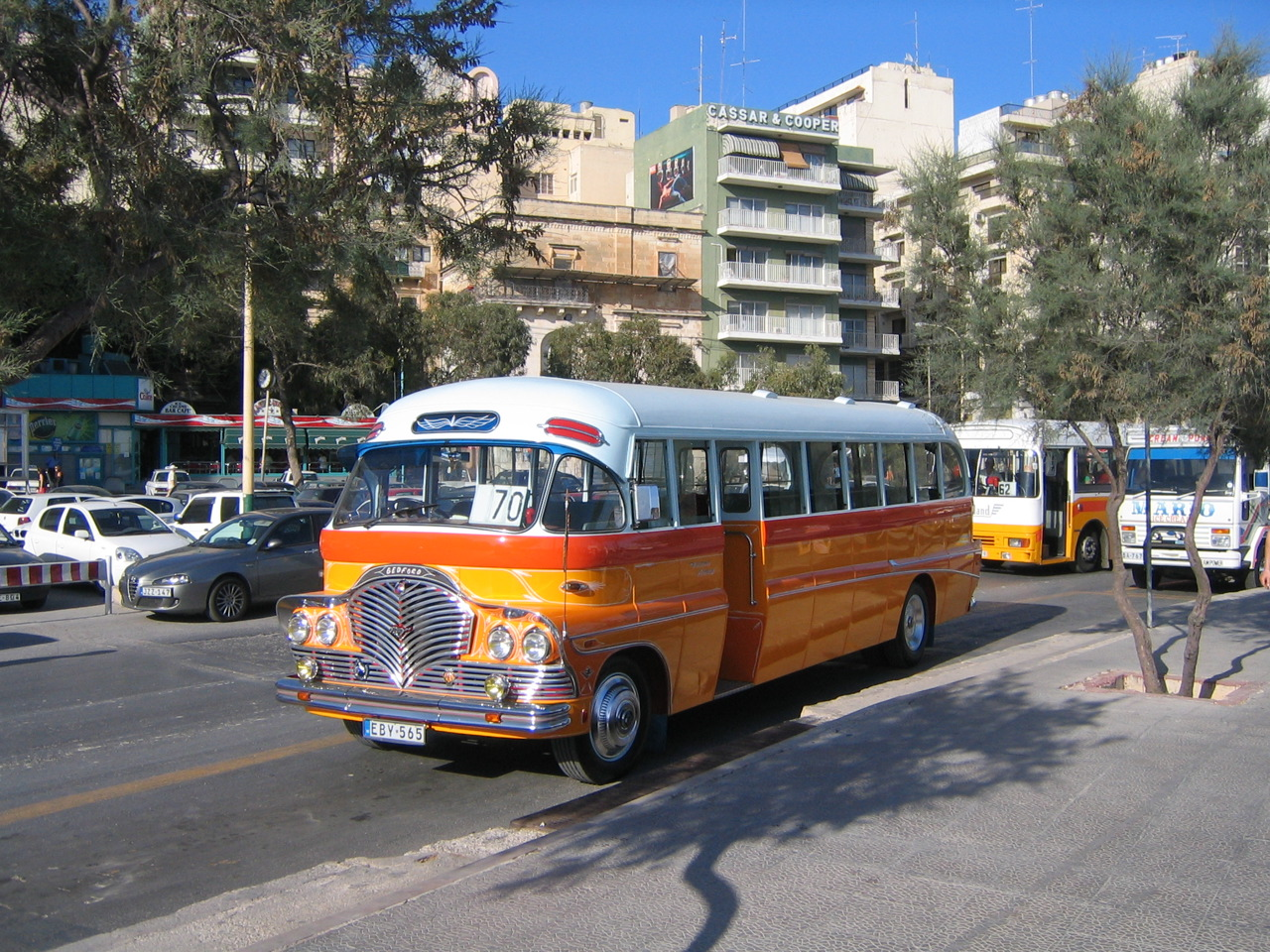
The shining chrome on a Malta bus

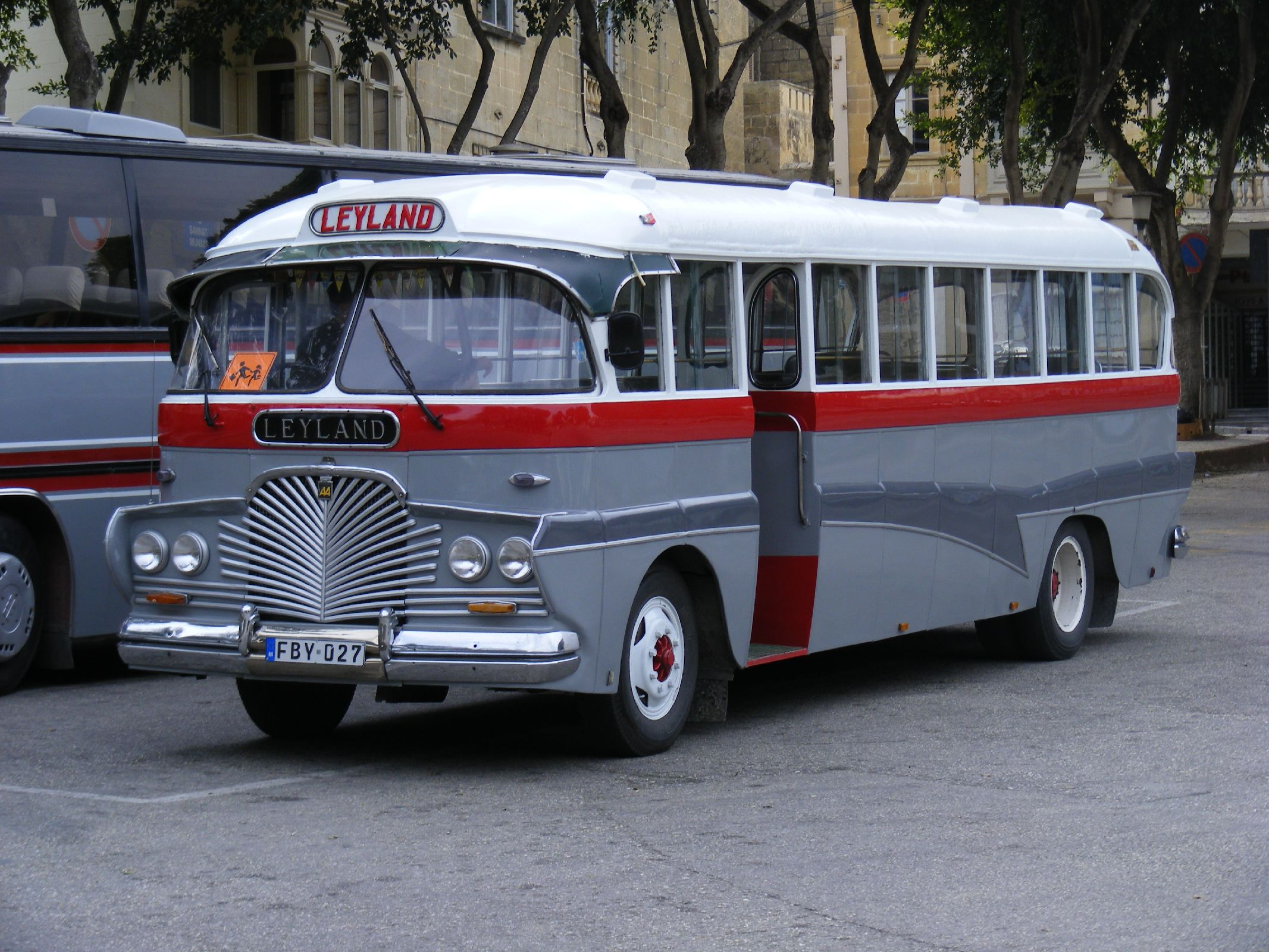
A Gozo bus in 2010

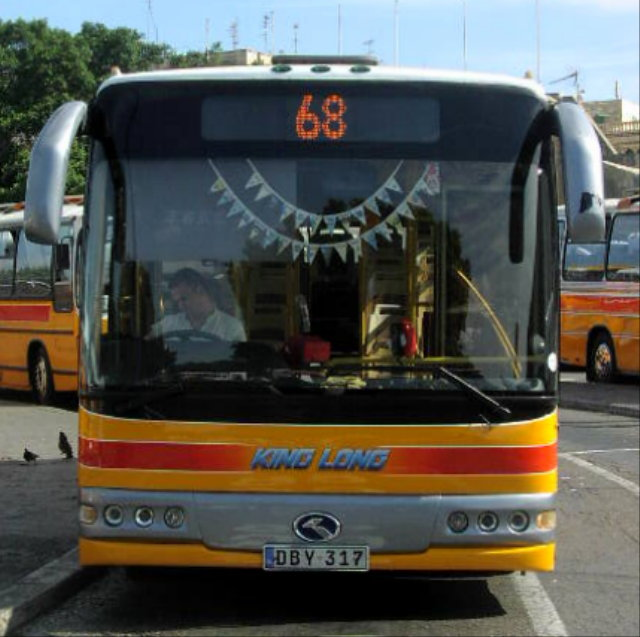
King Long Malta bus with an electronic route number display

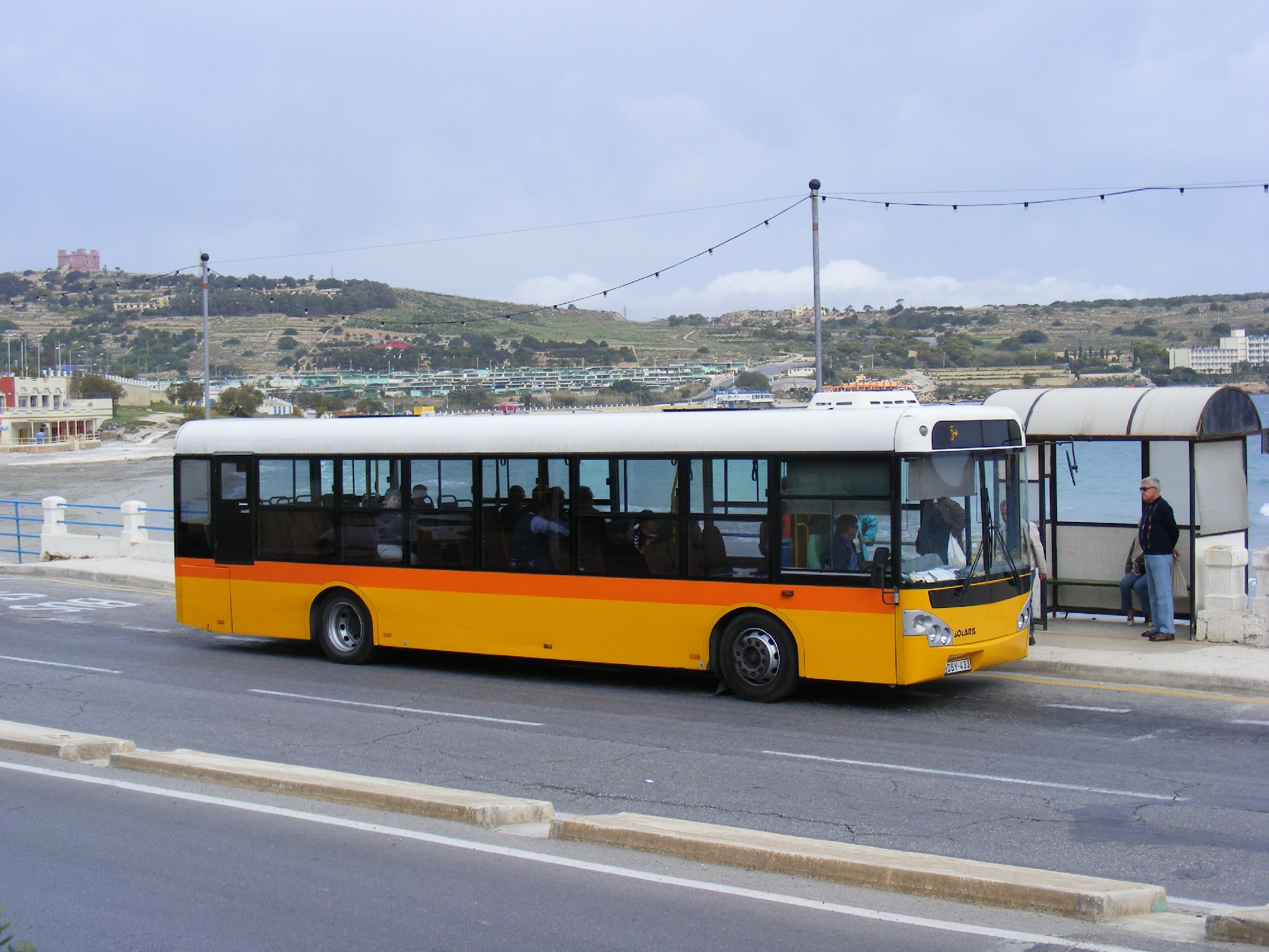
Solaris Valletta bus in 2010

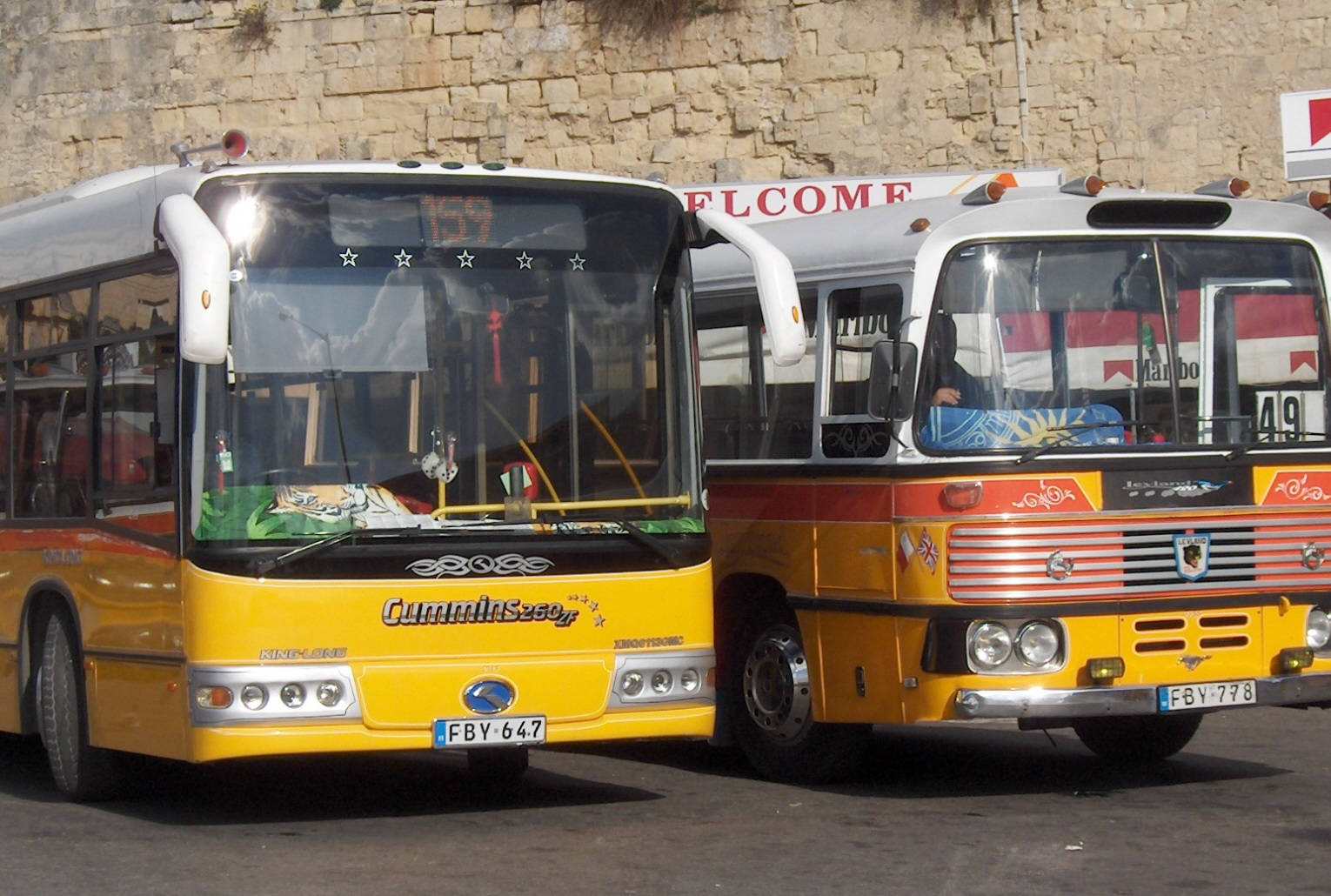
Old and new Malta buses in 2010

== Arriva (2011–2013) ==
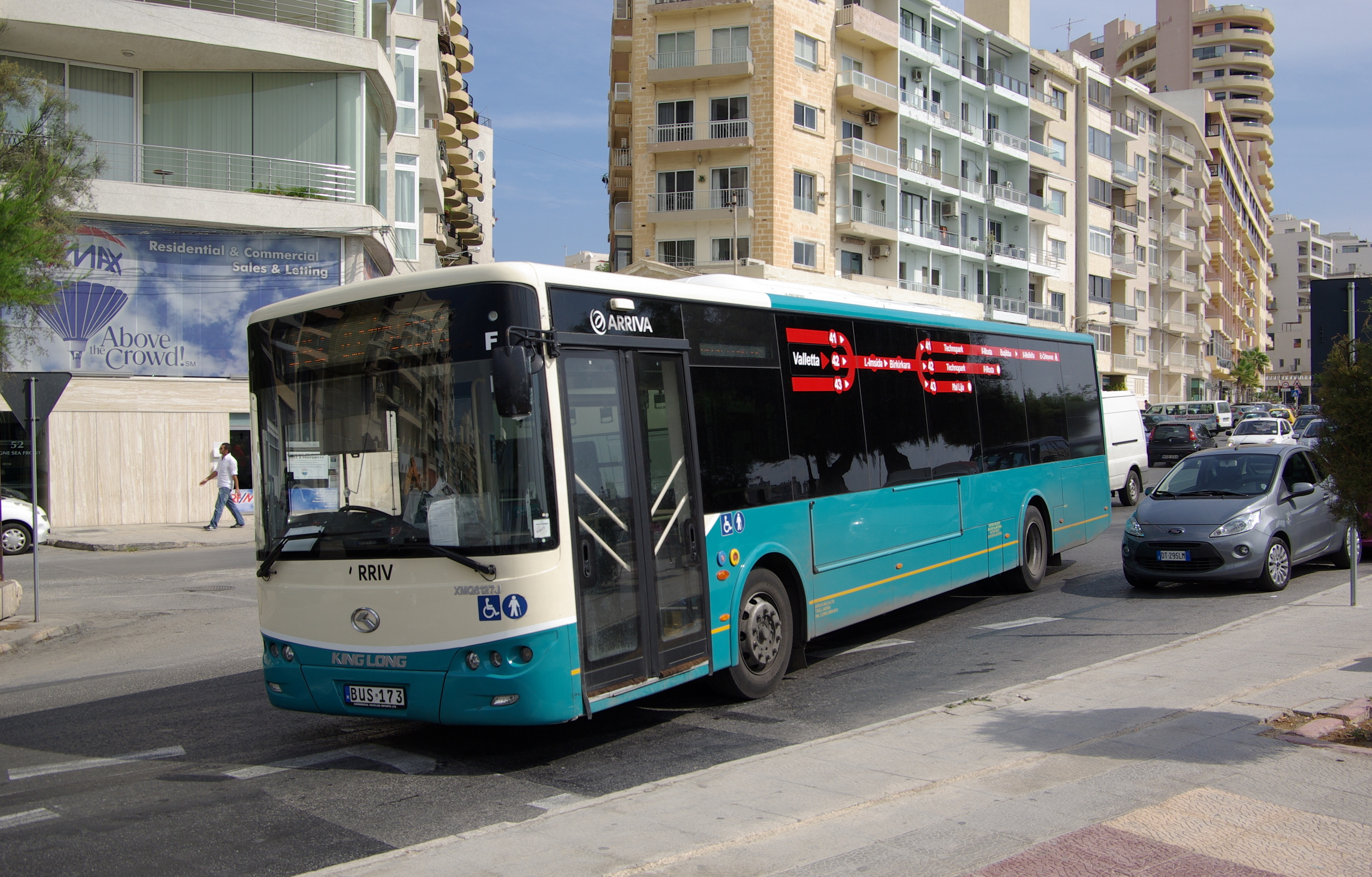
King Long Arriva Malta bus

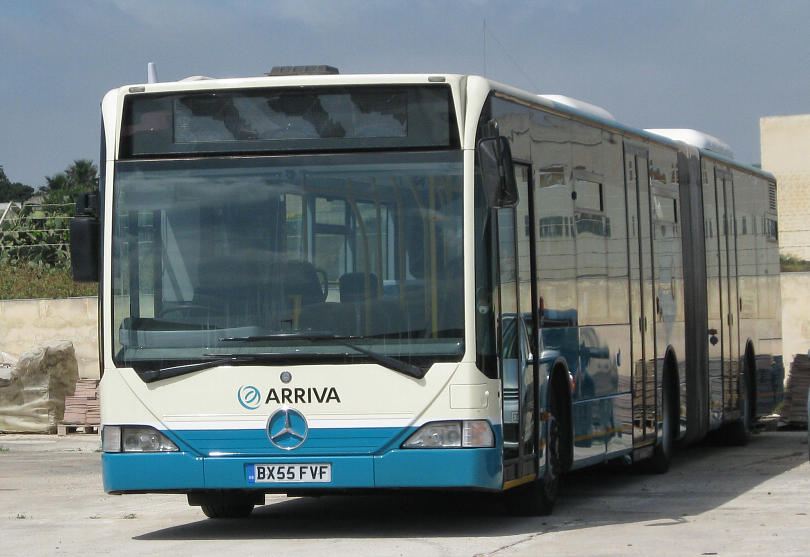
A Mercedes-Benz Citaro articulated bus imported from Arriva London

A major restructure of the bus service in Malta took place on 3 July 2011. The network was taken over by Arriva, new low-floor buses were introduced and service and fare structures changed dramatically.

Halcrow Group was commissioned to assess the Malta bus system. Released in November 2005, the report criticising the existing model and arrangement between ADT and ATP, which had produced a very low utilization of buses and a decline of 50% in the number of bus passengers between 1979 and 2009.

Finalised plans were announced in December 2008 for the first bus route restructuring on Malta since 1977. Under European Union rules, the right to operate the new network could not be directly transferred to the ATP, although they were free to tender for the contract. This resulted in the end of the state-subsidised owner-operator model, which as of 2009 stood at 508 buses each with an average age of 35 years, and operated by over 400 independent licensees.

The new fleet controlled by Arriva consisted of 264 buses, including 2 seven-metre buses for the intra-Valletta route, 61 nine-metre buses including 10 hybrid electric buses for park and ride services as well as selected village routes (Mater Dei-Ta' Qali, Paola-Xgħajra-Paola), 153 twelve-metre buses, and 46 articulated buses for airport routes and major routes such as those to Sliema and the ferry terminals.

The new system increased the number of available bus seats by 6,600 to 20,500, and the number of bus stops in Malta to 850 and another 120 in Gozo.

The major benefits to the public for the change were presented in November 2010:

1. €3.5m less per year in Malta government subsidy
2. First ever all-day bus service in Gozo, seven days a week
3. One fare everywhere
4. Cheap weekly fares for non-residents
5. New buses (for 70% of the fleet)
6. All buses with less polluting Euro 5 engines
7. Substantially lower emissions
8. All buses fully accessible
9. Air-conditioning and CCTV on all buses
10. More routes, more frequent
11. More termini, more interchanges
12. Longer operating hours for all routes
13. Night service
14. Maximum waiting times for all routes
15. Schedules and bus arrival times via SMS
16. More information on buses and bus stops
17. More employment
18. More discipline
19. Better trained drivers
20. An aquamarine-coloured livery

The bus fleet, all in Arriva's standard aquamarine and cream livery, was composed of Euro V King Long buses along with Arriva London's Mercedes-Benz Citaro G articulated buses. Some of the newer buses from the previous operator had also been introduced into the new system. The network received a subsidy of around €6 million per year. Passengers holding Maltese ID cards received a 40% reduction of the price of their journeys due to subsidised fares, while non-ID card holders (including tourists) paid the full undiscounted fare, prompting the European Commission to launch an inquiry on whether the two-tiered price structure violated EU discrimination laws.

The commencement of Arriva's services on 3 July 2011 was marred by many buses departing late or failing to turn up, primarily due to the absence of over 70 drivers who were due to transfer from the previous driver-owner system. This resulted in large crowds building up at Valletta's new bus terminus as well as other termini and stages across Malta.

Other issues increased the delays, such as incorrect or non-operational route information on buses and mechanical faults. Arriva also received criticism over the overhauled routes and timetables, which has increased journey times for some passengers.

During the first week of the new system, up to 180 drivers, most of whom had previously worked on the old network, failed to appear for duties. They cited Arriva's use of split-shifts as the reason for their non-appearance, as these had reportedly not been part of the conditions they had agreed to work under. Their actions received some criticism, with politician Emanuel Delia accusing the drivers of attempting to sabotage services so that the new system would be abandoned. Arriva responded by drafting in seventy temporary drivers from its UK operation and trained further Maltese drivers to cover for the missing employees. Some services were subcontracted to other companies.

A new shift pattern took effect at the end of July 2011. A series of changes to the new routes in response to criticism were announced on 23 July 2011, to be implemented between July and October. In August 2011, Arriva recognised the General Workers’ Union as a representative of its employees in the country. Further changes affecting 112 routes were announced in October by transport minister Austin Gatt, introducing more buses to Valletta and Mater Dei Hospital.

Arriva was harshly criticised both by commuters and by the government agency Transport Malta for consistently failing to keep up standards. On 14 November 2012, Arriva was harshly reprimanded by Transport Malta and given until the end of the month to bring up all its routes to 100% efficiency before TM would deploy its own shuttles at Arriva's expense.

In August 2013, the Government of Malta instructed Arriva Malta to remove the articulated buses from service, pending investigation following three major fire outbreaks in the span of 48 hours. The fires destroyed the buses and in one case caused extensive damage to some nearby vehicles belonging to MaltaPost, the national postal operator. Nobody was injured in these incidents. Like in the UK when the same buses had caught fire, these buses became a popular joke in conversations and social media sites.

By the end of December 2013 Arriva had run up losses of €50 million in two and a half years.

== Malta Public Transport (2014–present) ==
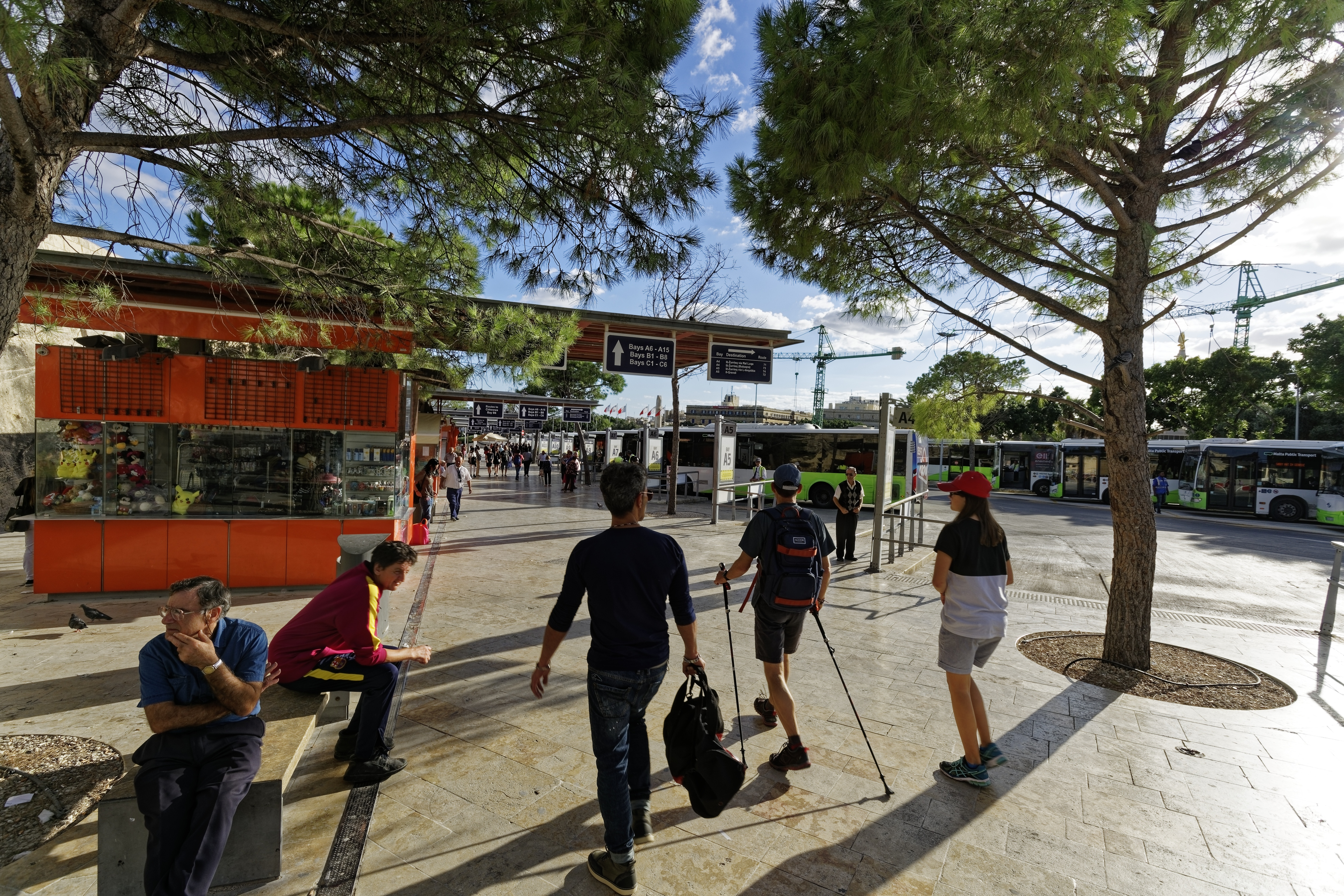
View of the Valletta City Gate Bus Station, 2017

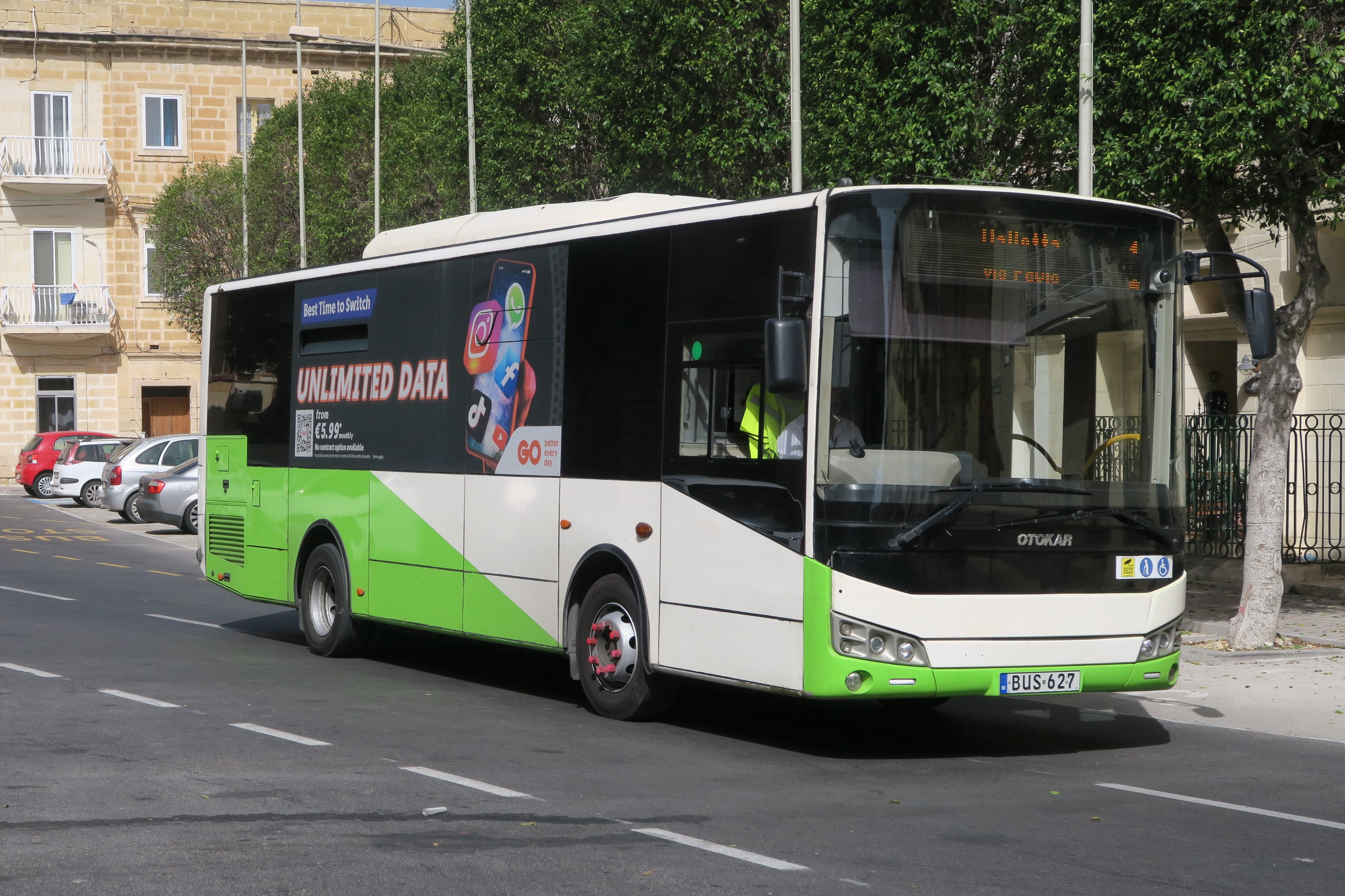
Buses in Malta pictured between 2021 and 2025

On 1 January 2014 Arriva ceased operations in Malta having been nationalised as Malta Public Transport by the Maltese government, with the intention of reprivatising the system under a new operator once one could be found.

Initially the buses, routes, livery, and tickets remained the same, but soon after the Arriva logos on buses were removed. New tickets with the name of the new company were introduced, and there were some minor changes in routes. By April 2014, three companies had submitted bids to operate the new bus services, these being Autobuses Urbanos de León, Gozo First, and Island Buses Malta.

Green logo of the Malta Public Transport

In May 2014 eleven new buses arrived in Malta, leased as the first part of a temporary new fleet of 45 buses to operate for Malta Public Transport. They were put to service in June 2014, and they were painted white with a small logo of Malta Public Transport.

As of October 2014 the government has chosen Autobuses Urbanos de León, subsidiary of ALSA Group, as its preferred bus operator for the country. The company took over the bus service on 8 January 2015, while retaining the name Malta Public Transport. The buses leased in the summer of 2014 were returned and the existing fleet was rebranded with a white and lime green livery.

Malta Public Transport has invested extensively in modernising its bus fleet making it safer, more environmentally friendly, and more comfortable. The company invested in 200 new buses with Euro 6 diesel technology. The buses are cleaned and maintained regularly, and are equipped with air-conditioning systems for added comfort. All new buses have two doors to facilitate boarding and alighting of passengers.

=== Bus routes ===
All single- and two-digit bus routes begin their journey from Valletta. Circular routes do not have a final stop and keep going back to Valletta. They are:

Main routes
| Route number | Destination |
|---|---|
| 1 | Isla |
| 2 | Birgu Centre |
| 3 | Kalkara |
| 4 | Bormla |
| 13 | Baħar iċ-Ċagħaq |
| 13A | San Ġiljan |
| 14 | Pembroke P&R (Park & Ride) |
| 15 | Sliema Ferries |
| 16 | Swieqi |
| 21 | Sliema |
| 22 | Birkirkara |
| 24 | San Ġwann (Skate Park first, Circular) |
| 25 | San Ġwann (Savoy first, Circular) |
| 31/31A | Buġibba (Goes through Mater Dei) |
| 32 | Swatar |
| 35 | San Ġwann (Circular) |
| 41 | Ċirkewwa (passes through Kulleġġ) |
| 42 | Ċirkewwa (passes through Santa Venera) |
| 43 | Naxxar |
| 44 | Għajn Tuffieħa |
| 45 | Buġibba |
| 46 | Għargħur |
| 47 | Mosta (Santa Margerita, Circular) |
| 48 | Buġibba (Slight difference in route to 45) |
| 49 | Għadira (Armier Bay during summer) |
| 50 | Rabat |
| 51 | Mtarfa |
| 52 | Dingli |
| 53 | Rabat Virtu (Goes around Rabat) |
| 54 | Attard |
| 56 | Dingli (Longer route, passes through Rabat) |
| 58 | Birkirkara Stazzjon (Ħamrun) |
| 58A | Birkirkara Stazzjon (Psaila Street) |
| 61 | Żebbuġ |
| 62 | Siġġiewi (Circular) |
| 63 | Qormi |
| 64 | Santa Venera (via Central Business District and Qormi) |
| 71 | Żurrieq |
| 72 | Qrendi |
| 73 | Żurrieq (Qrendi, Blue Grotto during summer) |
| 74 | Żurrieq (Bubaqra) |
| 80 | Birżebbuġa (Does not pass through Paola) |
| 81 | Marsaxlokk |
| 82 | Birżebbuġa (Goes around Birżebbuġa) - southbound only |
| 82A | Birżebbuġa (Goes around Birżebbuġa and through the centre) - southbound only |
| 82B | Birżebbuġa (via Ħal Far) |
| 83 | Santa Luċija (Circular) |
| 84 | Żejtun |
| 85 | Marsaxlokk (via Qajjenza) - southbound only |
| 88 | Airport (via Gudja) |
| 90 | Żabbar |
| 91 | Marsaskala |
| 92 | Marsaskala (Żonqor, skips Żabbar center) |
| 93 | Marsaskala (Jerma, skips Żabbar center) |
| 94 | Xgħajra |
| 95 | Fgura (circular, via Floriana, Marsa, and Fgura) |

Triple digit routes run between towns and from towns to important places (such as the general hospital, the airport and P&R car parks). Some do run to Valletta but do not run as often and are used more as shuttle services. They are:

Side routes
| Route number | Start | End |
|---|---|---|
| 101 | Ċirkewwa | Ġnejna in summer, Mġarr in winter |
| 103 | Pembroke P&R | Bidnija |
| 106 | Attard | Mater Dei |
| 109 | Siġġiewi | Baħrija |
| 109A | Siġġiewi | Baħrija (shorter) |
| 110 | Pembroke P&R | Marsa P&R |
| 117 | Mqabba | Mater Dei |
| 119 | Marsaskala | Airport |
| 120 | Pembroke P&R | Xgħajra |
| 121 | Pembroke P&R | Xgħajra (shorter and replaces route 120 in the evenings) |
| 122 | Valletta | Mater Dei |
| 124 | Marsaskala | Isla |
| 130 | Valletta | Valletta (Circular route that passes by the Waterfront) |
| 133 | Valletta | Valletta (Circular route that passes through the center; is always run by VDL Midcity) |
| 135 | Marsaskala | Mater Dei (via Airport) |
| 150 | Valletta (Lascaris) | MCAST Paola |
| 181 | Dingli | Mater Dei |
| 182 | Mtarfa | Mater Dei |
| 186 | Rabat | Buġibba |
| 191 | Marsaskala | Marsaskala (Circular route) |
| 201 | Rabat | Airport |
| 202 | Rabat | Sliema |
| 203 | Buġibba | Sliema |
| 204 | Marsaskala | Mater Dei |
| 205 | Birżebbuġa | Marsa P&R |
| 206 | Żejtun | Mater Dei |
| 207 | Naxxar | Marsa P&R |
| 208 | Airport | Mater Dei |
| 209 | Siġġiewi | Mater Dei |
| 210 | Birżebbuġa | Mater Dei |
| 211 | Paola | Sliema |
| 212 | Buġibba | Sliema |
| 213 | Isla/Kalkara | Mater Dei |
| 214 | Buġibba | Airport |
| 218 | Mqabba | Mater Dei (Does not pass through Airport) |
| 221 | Ċirkewwa | Buġibba |
| 222 | Ċirkewwa | Sliema |
| 223 | Buġibba | Għajn Tuffieħa |
| 225 | Sliema | Għajn Tuffieħa |
| 226 | Gudja | Mater Dei |
| 233 | Swieqi | Mater Dei |
| 238 | Valletta | Mġarr (shorter route on weekends and public holidays) |
| 250 | Valletta | Għadira Bay |
| 260 | Valletta | Għargħur |
| 280 | Buġibba | Mater Dei |
| 300 | Valletta (Lascaris) | Mater Dei |

Three-digit routes starting with 3 (except route 300) run on the smaller island of Gozo, with most leaving/passing through the largest town of Rabat (Victoria) in the centre of the island. These are as follows:

| Route number | Start | End |
|---|---|---|
| 301 | Rabat (Victoria) | Mġarr, Gozo (direct) |
| 302 | Rabat (Victoria) | Ramla Bay (via Ta' Xħajma P&R, Nadur) |
| 303 | Rabat (Victoria) | Mġarr (longer route via Nadur, Qala, Għajnsielem) |
| 305 | Rabat (Victoria) | Rabat (Victoria) (circular route via Sannat) |
| 306 | Rabat (Victoria) | Xlendi (via Munxar) |
| 307 | Rabat (Victoria) | Rabat (Victoria) (circular route via Xagħra) |
| 308 | Rabat (Victoria) | Rabat (Victoria) (circular route via Għasri) |
| 309 | Rabat (Victoria) | Rabat (Victoria) (circular route via Żebbuġ) |
| 310 | Rabat (Victoria) | Rabat (Victoria) (circular route via Marsalforn) |
| 311 | Rabat (Victoria) | Dwejra |
| 312 | Rabat (Victoria) | Rabat (Victoria) (circular route via Għarb, San Lawrenz) |
| 313 | Rabat (Victoria) | Rabat (Victoria) (circular route via Kerċem, Santa Luċija) |
| 322 | Mġarr | Marsalforn (via Nadur, Xagħra) |
| 323 | Rabat (Victoria) | Mġarr (via Xewkija, Għajnsielem) |
| 330 | Rabat (Victoria) | Xlendi (direct) |

Three-digit routes starting with 4 are usually reserved for circular routes around towns/villages. Routes 401 and 402 were introduced starting in July 2025, with additional routes added in the months that followed.

| Route number | Start | End |
|---|---|---|
| 401 | Paola (Addolorata Cemetery P&R) | Paola (Circular route via Tarxien) |
| 402 | Paola (Addolorata Cemetery P&R) | Mater Dei |
| 403 | Ta' Qali P&R | Mater Dei |
| 404 | Ta' Qali P&R | Ta' Qali P&R (Circular route via Rabat) |
| 405 | Ta' Qali P&R | Ta' Qali P&R (Circular route via Mosta) |
| 406 | Buġibba | Buġibba (Circular route via Qawra) |
| 407 | Żejtun | Żejtun (Circular route) |
| 409 | Marsa P&R | Marsa P&R (Circular route via Qormi) |
| 410 | Sliema | Sliema (Circular route) |

Night routes run late into the night and into the next day, most start from Valletta except for a few. The routes (except for N11) mostly follow the same route the equivalent daytime route. They are:

Night routes
| Route number | Start | End |
|---|---|---|
| N3 | Valletta | Kalkara |
| N11 | St Julian's | Ċirkewwa |
| N13 | Valletta | St Julian's |
| N48 | Valletta | Buġibba |
| N52 | Valletta | Dingli |
| N62 | Valletta | Siġġiewi |
| N71 | Valletta | Żurrieq |
| N82 | Valletta | Birżebbuġa |
| N91 | Valletta | Marsaskala |
| N120 | Pembroke Park and Ride | Xgħajra |
| N212 | Sliema | Buġibba |
| N301 | Victoria, Gozo | Mġarr, Gozo |

X routes are 'express' routes using main roads and bypasses with very few stops. They are:

X routes
| Route number | Start | End |
|---|---|---|
| X1 (Discontinued) | Airport | Ċirkewwa |
| X1A | MCAST Paola | Ċirkewwa |
| X2 (Discontinued) | Airport | St Julian's |
| X3 (re-labelled as 214) | Airport | Buġibba |
| X4 (Discontinued) | Valletta | Birżebbuġa |
| X299 | Mater Dei | Ċirkewwa |
| X300 | Valletta | Ċirkewwa |

Tallinja Direct (TD) routes are routes with few to no stops between start and end, typically starting from the airport and using main roads and bypasses. In the past, many more existed but were discontinued during the COVID-19 pandemic.

TD routes
| Route number | Start | End |
|---|---|---|
| TD1 | Ċirkewwa | Airport (via Buġibba, Rabat) |
| TD2 | St Julian's | Airport (circular route via St Julian's) |
| TD3 | St Julian's | Airport (circular route via St Julian's, Gżira) |
| TD4 | Valletta | Airport |
| TD5 | Buġibba | Airport |
| TD10 | Valletta | Marsaxlokk (Sundays only) |
| TD13 | Valletta | Buġibba |
| TD30 (Discontinued) | Mġarr, Gozo | Xlendi (direct, skipping Victoria) |
| TD31 (Discontinued) | Mġarr, Gozo | Marsalforn |

=== Tallinja card ===
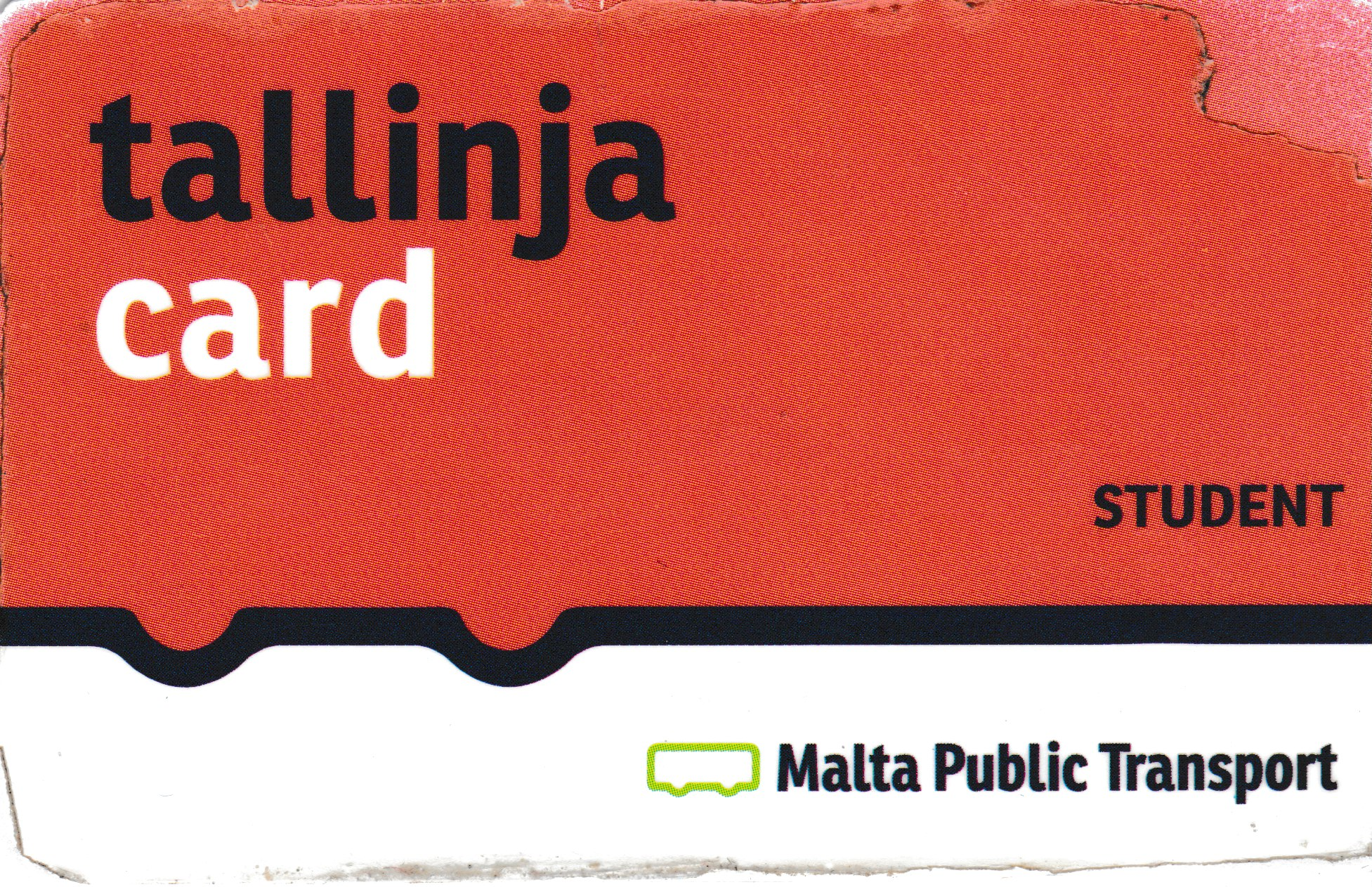
A Student Tallinja Card

In the summer of 2015, the company introduced the personalised Tallinja card, a smart card which provided cheaper fares and faster boarding to Maltese residents. By 2019, over 320,000 individuals had a personalised Tallinja card. Bus use increased by around 20% following the introduction of the card.

Since 2019, travel using the Student Tallinja cards was made fare-free. While fares were still taken from the account balance of the card, all fares taken during the month are added back to the account balance at the end of the month.

Since October 2022, Malta Public Transport has been free for all residents of the country with a valid personalised Tallinja Card, and not just Student cards. This does not apply to "Tallinja Direct" routes that usually provide a faster transit time. The fares for such TD buses are €3 for cash payments and €1.50 for Tallinja Card payments.

In August 2026, it was announced that an 'inactivity fee' of €5 would be charged if the card was not used at least once a year.

==== Versions ====
| Name | Colour | Intended demographic |
|---|---|---|
| Adult Tallinja Card | Lime green | Those aged 17+ |
| Child Tallinja Card | Yellow | Those aged 5 to 11 |
| Student Tallinja Card | Red | Those aged 11 to 16 as well as anyone else attending a full-time course with a recognised educational institution for at least three months |
| Gozo Resident | Lavender | Residents of Gozo who are aged 16+ |
| Concession | Light blue | People with disabilities and the elderly |

== Fleet ==
Malta Public Transport's fleet mainly consists of buses from the brands Otokar and King Long, however, Malta Public Transport has a fleet of 10 ex-Heathrow Airport siding Mercedes-Benz Citaro C1 facelifts as of 2025; some buses are currently being used as a driver trainer, some went back to the UK and others have gone to Cyprus for School bus services. One Yutong E12 that was formerly used by Cyprus Public Transport and a VDL Midicity. Between 2014 and 2015, Malta Public Transport also had buses from the United Kingdom to compensate for a small fleet, Wright Eclipse 2s and Optare Solo SRs were leased from Dawson Group.

The most common buses in Malta are the Otokar Kent C which make up most of the fleet, and the King Long B12, of which the first batch of 30 arrived in March 2024, and a batch of 100 arrived in May 2025. There were also some other notable buses in the fleet, such as ex-Arriva Optare Solos and locally built "Scarnif SLFs" in the early days of Malta Public Transport too. As of 2025, The diesel fleet is entirely made up of Euro 6 compliant engines, with the last batch of former Arriva King Long XMQ6127j Euro 5 buses being retired from public service in June 2025. Some of these Euro 5 buses are used as driver trainers as of June 2026.

=== Electric buses ===
In 2019, Malta Public Transport started experimenting with electric buses by ordering one electric bus by Slovenian manufacturer TAM registered as BUS-500. It entered public service in January 2020 on a special route dubbed the X122 that was an express version of the 122 route (Valletta - St Luke's Hospital (Gwardamanġa) - Mater Dei Hospital). However, due to COVID-19 restrictions, testing of the electric bus had to be cut short as the company had to purge some of its fleet. The bus remained abandoned until early 2022 at the Floriana Ditch depot.

Around the summer of 2020, the Ministry of Gozo, with the help of European Union funds, ordered six 12-meter buses from Chinese manufacturer Foton for use on the Port of Mġarr - Ta' Xħajma Park and Ride service to help reduce traffic in the area. The buses landed on Maltese shores in the summer of 2020 and entered service over a year later on November 10, 2021, because there were delays from the charger company and COVID-19 pandemic restrictions.

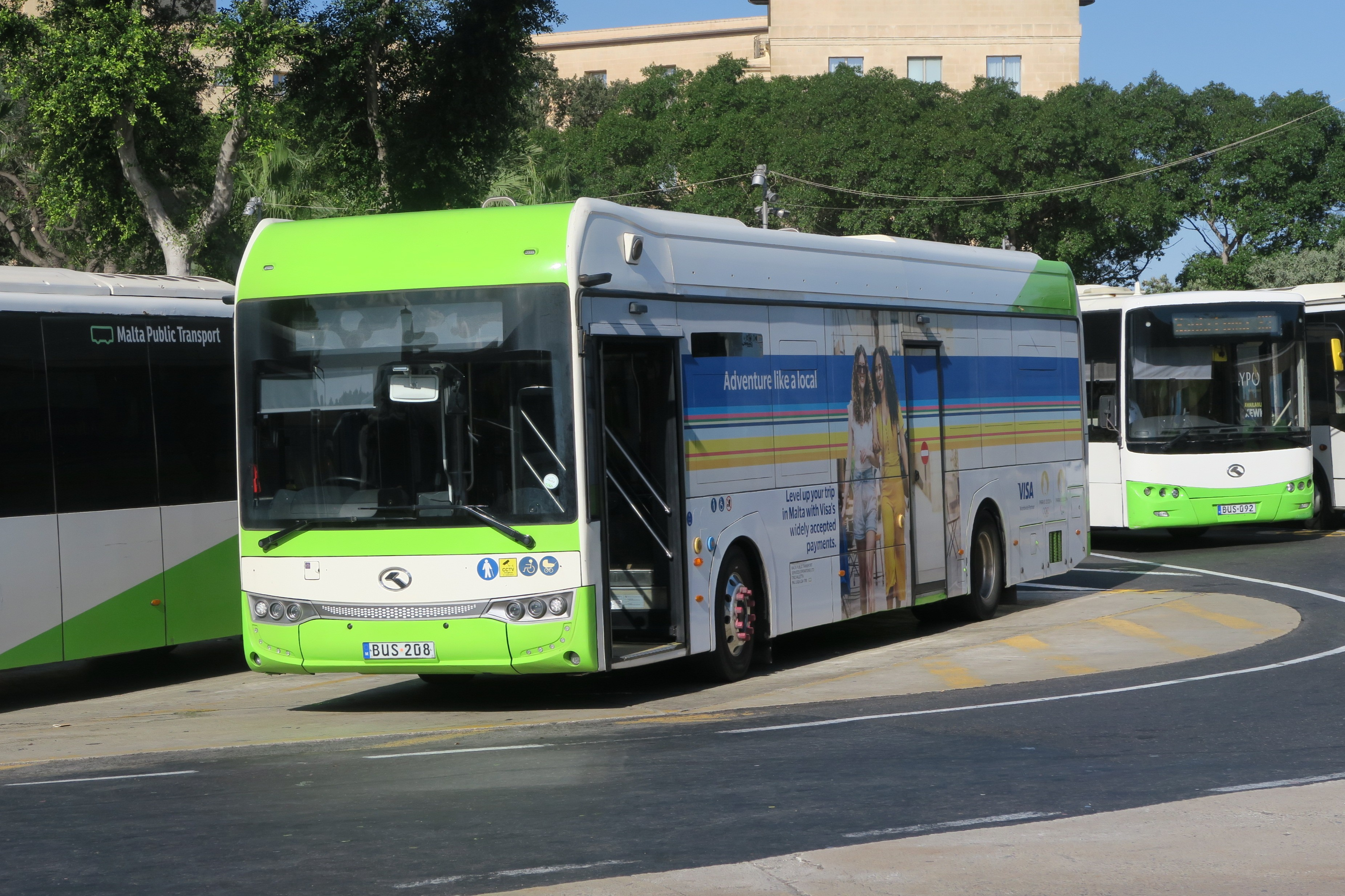
King Long Amigo (PEV12) electric bus registered BUS-208 at the Valletta bus terminus

In January 2022, an order of two 12-meter electric buses was made from Chinese manufacturer King Long, specifically, their PEV12 model (named "Amigo" for the Maltese market). On the 27th of April 2022, these two electric buses were inaugurated into service and plated BUS-400 and BUS-401, however they did not appear until a month later with BUS-200 and BUS-201. In June 2022, BUS-201 was re-numbered as BUS-232 and sent to Gozo for testing on route 301, while BUS-200 stayed on the mainland and was tested on the three busiest northern routes, those being 13A, 31 and 48. These buses feature a 300 km range when fully charged, and by the start of 2023, were trialed on more busy northern routes such as the 41, 14 and 45.

In January 2023, Malta Public Transport received an order of 30 new fully-electric buses, which slowly entered in service in early summer of the same year. The first three to be registered, BUS-202, BUS-203 and BUS-204 were sent to Gozo somewhere around June, replacing earlier-batch BUS-201 that was testing on the island. These three units were the first out of thirty to be launched into public service running on Gozo's busiest route, the 301. Meanwhile, around early-mid summer 2023, some other electric buses started rolling into service, most notably on high demand routes such as the 13A and the 48 and were even trialed on routes that did not serve Valletta, such as the 222 and the 212 during the same summer.

On September 14, 2023, the thirty new electric buses were inaugurated into service at a ceremony held at a new electric bus depot situated between the towns of Floriana, Pietà and Marsa which was formerly a park and ride site. The site was mounted with charges by Finnish company Kempower. The electric buses were launched on the 13 busiest bus routes on the island (13A, TD13, 13, 14, 31, 41–43, 45–49, 300) and a promise of 120 new electric buses by the end of 2025 was made.

Along with 30 electric buses, one six-meter King Long PEV6 bus was brought over to the island and registered, BUS-295. In the first few months of service, the bus was specifically being used on the "Talinja on Demand" service and entered in complete public service in early 2024 on the Central Business District (CBD) park and ride service, which connect the industrial zone of Mriehel to the nearby towns of Birkirkara and Santa Venera and on the Castile Shuttle, a park and ride service launched by the Valletta local council. Between March and April 2024, the bus was tested on low and high frequency routes. During March, it was tested on Route 106, a low-frequency route that connects the main hospital of Mater Dei Hospital and the town of Attard and in April of the same year on Route 41, a pivotal route between the port area of Ċirkewwa and the capital city. As of 2025 and the discontinuation of the Tallinja on Demand service during weekdays, the bus is being used on the CBD shuttle and as a feeder on the high-demand Route 16 between the capital city and the town of Swieqi.

In late 2024, the government announced that it will be redirecting EU funds away from public transport in favor of private electric transport, breaking a one-year promise to make most of the fleet electric, however, around October 2024, one electric bus made its way to Malta that was formerly a part of the Cyprus Public Transport fleet, one twelve-meter Yutong E12 that was delivered new to the Cyprus Public Transport (CPT) Nicosia depot in summer 2023 and formerly registered as PNE-102 (fleet no. 1330). The bus stood still for around one month at the bus station, getting coated in green and white, and entered service around late November 2024, to ease off demand on routes 13A, 31 and 48, however the bus has been trialed on routes 14, 41 and 45.

Around April 2025, the King Long Amigo electric buses started operation on busy southern routes (Routes 90, 91, 92, 93 and 94) for better usage of the buses bringing up the total number of served routes to 18 and one-off/rare trials/sightings have been spotted mainly on the 50s range of routes (most notably 52 and 56). In August 2025, two new King Long PEV9s registered BUS-296 and 297 arrived on Maltese shores and entered in service on Monday, 8th September 2025 on routes serving the San Ġwann and Ta' Xbiex areas. They are the first 9-meter electric buses in Malta. In May 2026, an addition of 40 new electric buses was announced, including 6-meter minivans and longer 9- and 12-meter buses.

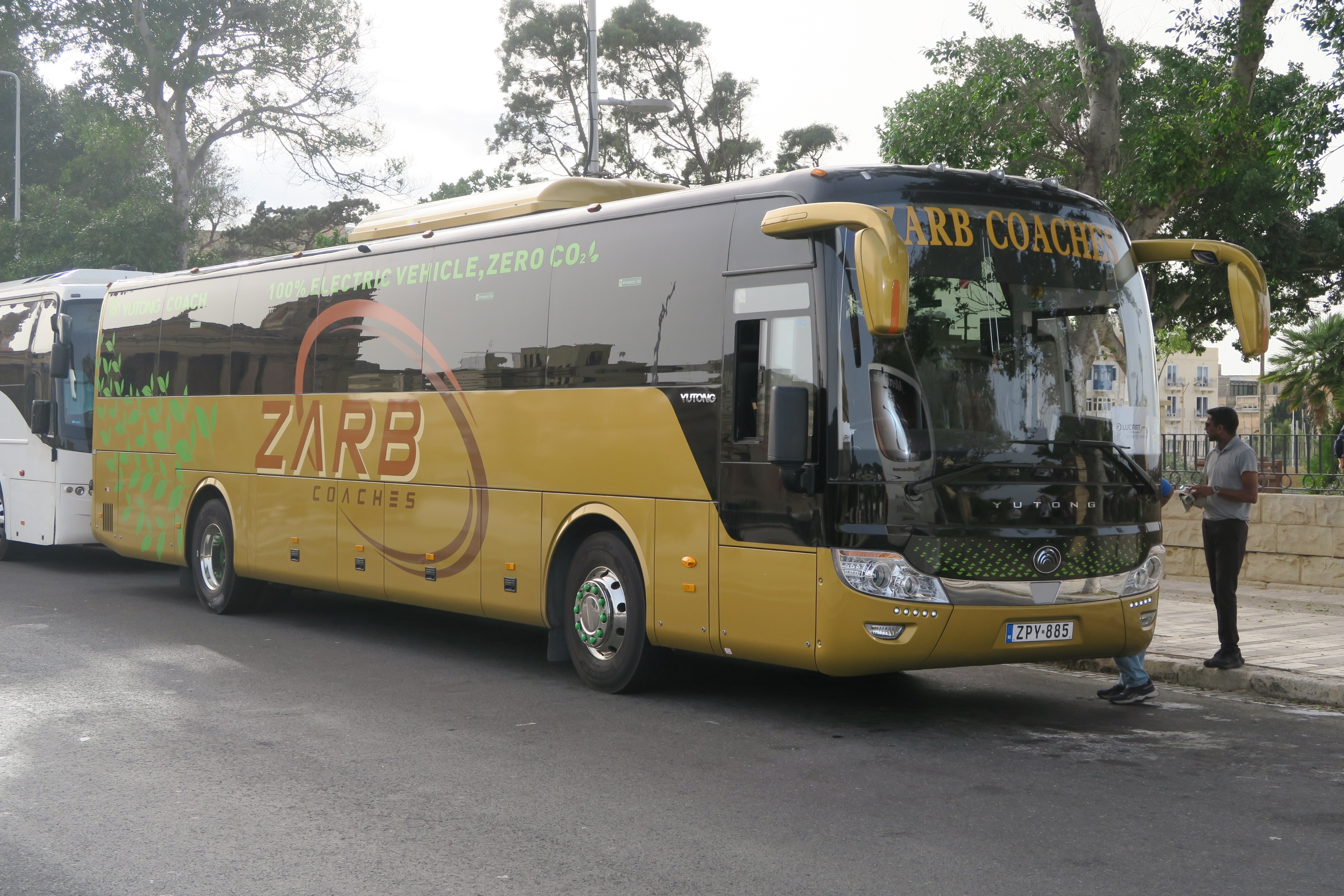
A Yutong ICe12 used by Zarb Coaches

Other than Malta Public Transport, the only other company to invest in electric buses is a private coach company, Zarb Coaches, which ordered a batch of four twelve-meter Yutong ICe12 coaches in April 2024 and one other in around late 2024. These coaches can be often found at the Electric Bus charging depot, the same one used by buses in public service.

== Open-top buses ==
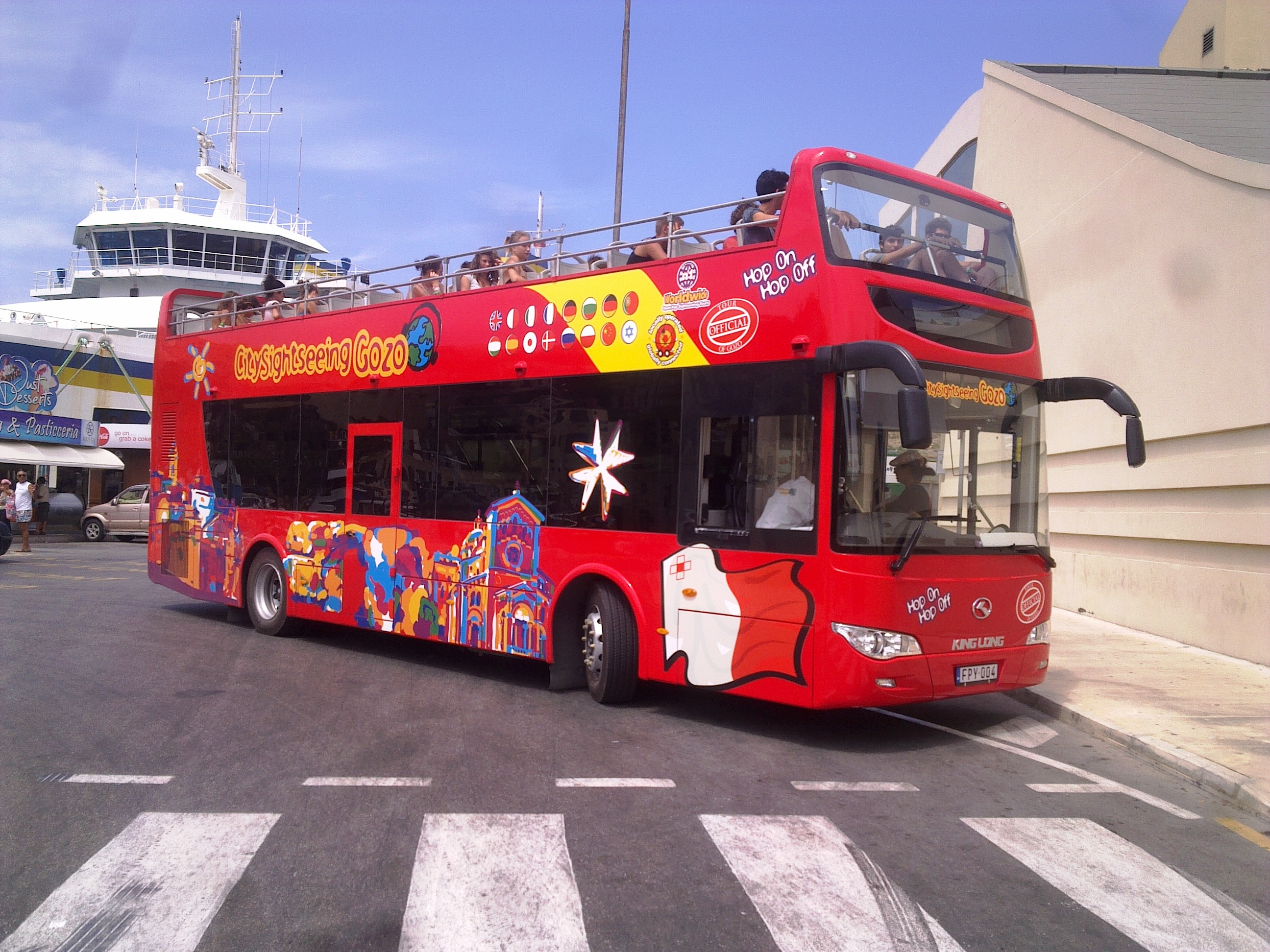
City Sightseeing Gozo open top bus at Mġarr Harbour, July 2012

Open-top bus operation on Malta was first proposed in the early 1990s, when several double-deck vehicles were imported from the United Kingdom by private company Garden of Eden. The transport authority refused to license their operation as passengers standing on the top deck could reach a height over four metres, the maximum level allowed. In June 2007, this decision was reversed and two tourist services, a north tour and a south tour, began operation using eight open-top vehicles and this has since been expanded with a similar tour on Gozo introduced. Typically, the north and south tour can be distinguished from the colour of the buses themselves, with the north tour bus having a blue livery and the south tour bus having a red livery.

== See also ==
- Customised buses
- List of bus routes in Malta
- Transport in Malta
- Vehicle registration plates of Malta
