= Vehicle registration plates of Malta =

Republic of Malta/Repubblika ta' Malta
- Current regular private standard number plate from Malta.
- Country: Malta
- Country code: M

Current series
- Size: 520 mm × 110 mm 20.5 in × 4.3 in
- Colour (front): Black on white
- Colour (rear): Black on white

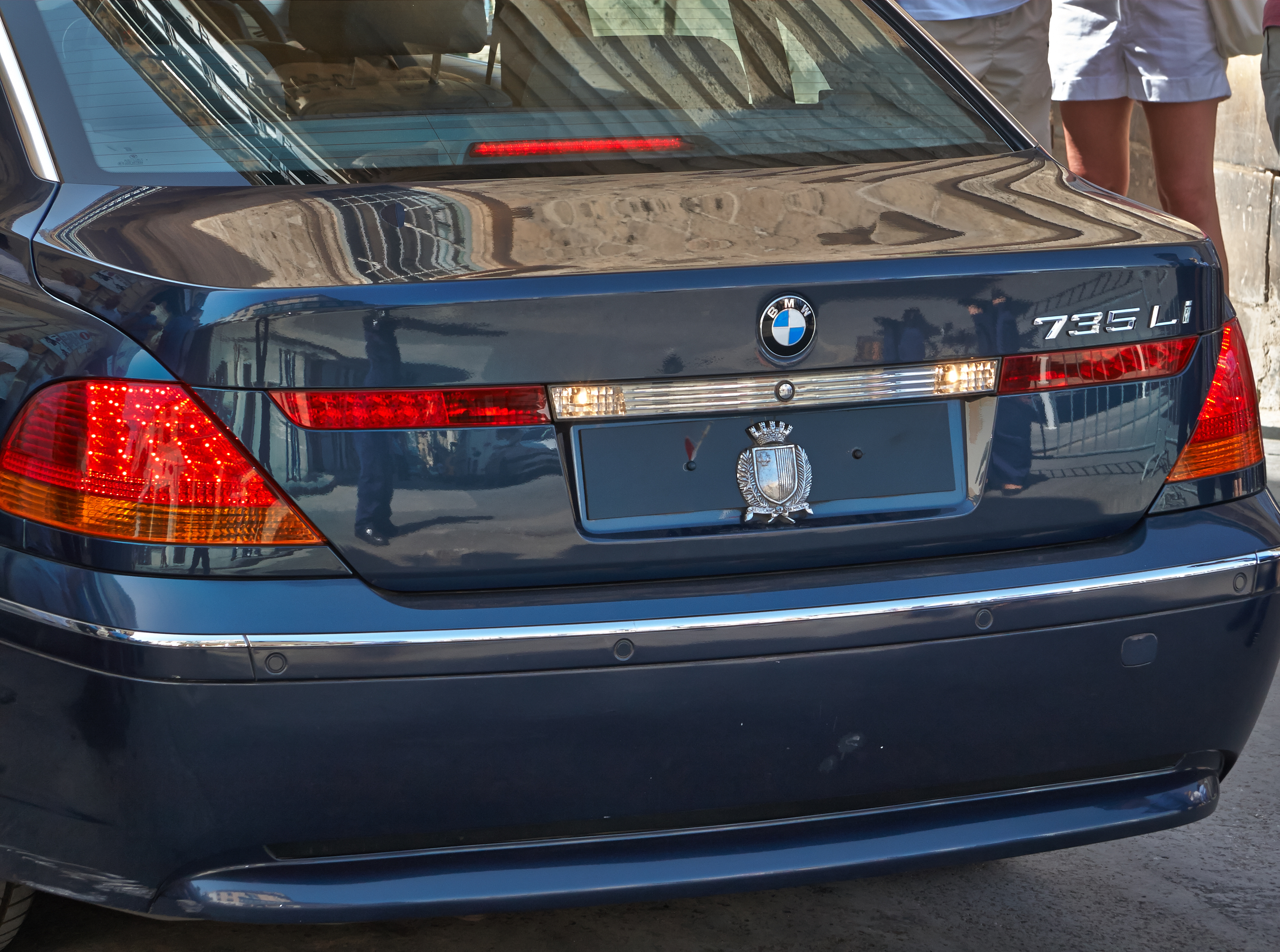
President's vehicle, displaying the Coat of Arms of Malta instead of a number plate

Maltese registration plates are the number plates used within Malta to uniquely identify motor vehicles. Since 1995, the three letter, three number system (ZZZ 999) has been in use in Malta for vehicle registration. The characters are always printed in black on a white background, and to the left one can find a blue box with the Flag of the European Union and the letter M (for Malta) underneath it in white. The typeface used on Maltese registration plates is FE-Schrift which is also the typeface used on German vehicle registration plates.

== Special number plate series ==
Taxicab plate

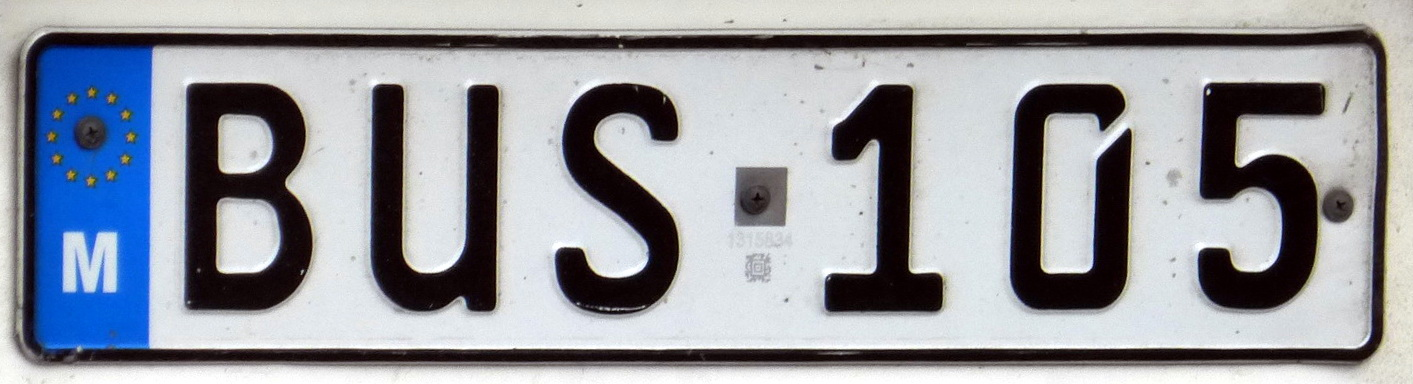
A BUS number plate

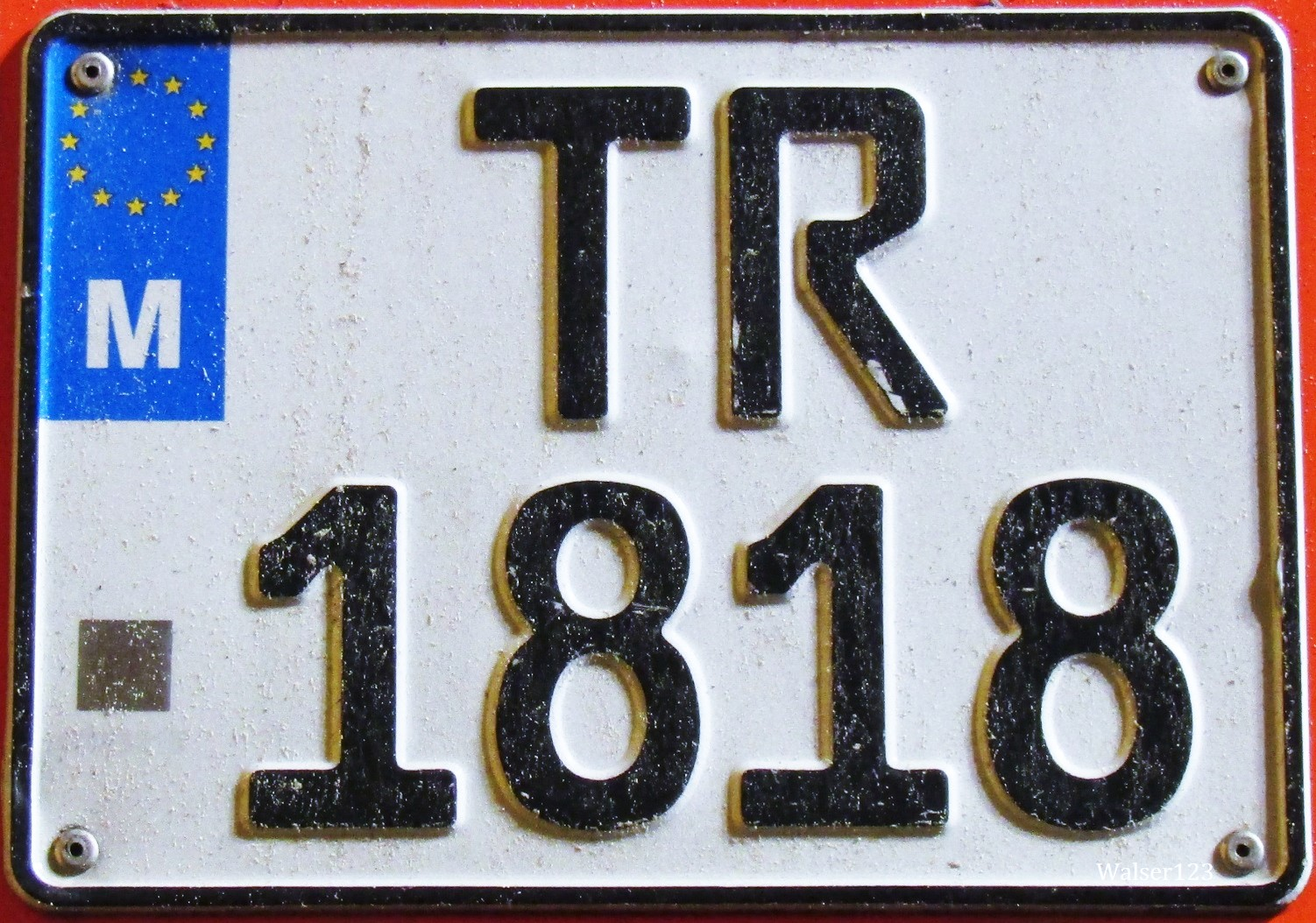
Maltese trailer plate

- Rental cars: all end with a K or QZ (e.g., XXK 001)
- As from 2017, Vintage and Classic vehicle registration plate characters are printed in silver on a black background
- Cars which are being leased: all end with a QZ (e.g., XQZ 001)
- Taxis: letters TAXI and after three numbers one letter M or G (e.g., TAXI 001M for island of Malta or TAXI 001G for Gozo)
- Buses/minibuses/coaches: all end with a PY (e.g., XPY 001)
- Trailers: all begin with a TR (e.g., TR 1234)
- Public buses are registered with BUS as their letters (e.g., BUS 001). Prior to their replacement by the current Malta Public Transport buses, Malta buses were registered with DBY, EBY or FBY (e.g., DBY 001, EBY 001 or FBY 001).
- Tax free cars: all begin with a TF (e.g., TFX 001)
- Mobile post offices of Malta: begin with a POSTA (e.g. POSTA 1)
- Government owned cars: all begin with a GV (e.g., GVX 001)
  - Police cars are registered using GVP as their letters (e.g., GVP 001)
  - Vehicles of the Armed Forces of Malta are registered using GVA as their letters (e.g., GVA 001)
  - Vehicles belonging to the Department of Health use GVH letters on their plates (e.g., GVH 001)
- Diplomatic/embassy vehicles use CD as their first 2 letters (e.g., CDX 001)
- Chauffeur driven vehicles used by Ministers of Government use the format GM 99 (the letters GM followed by two numbers; e.g., GM 01)
- The President, the Prime Minister and Archbishop are exempt from number plates and affix their respective emblems instead

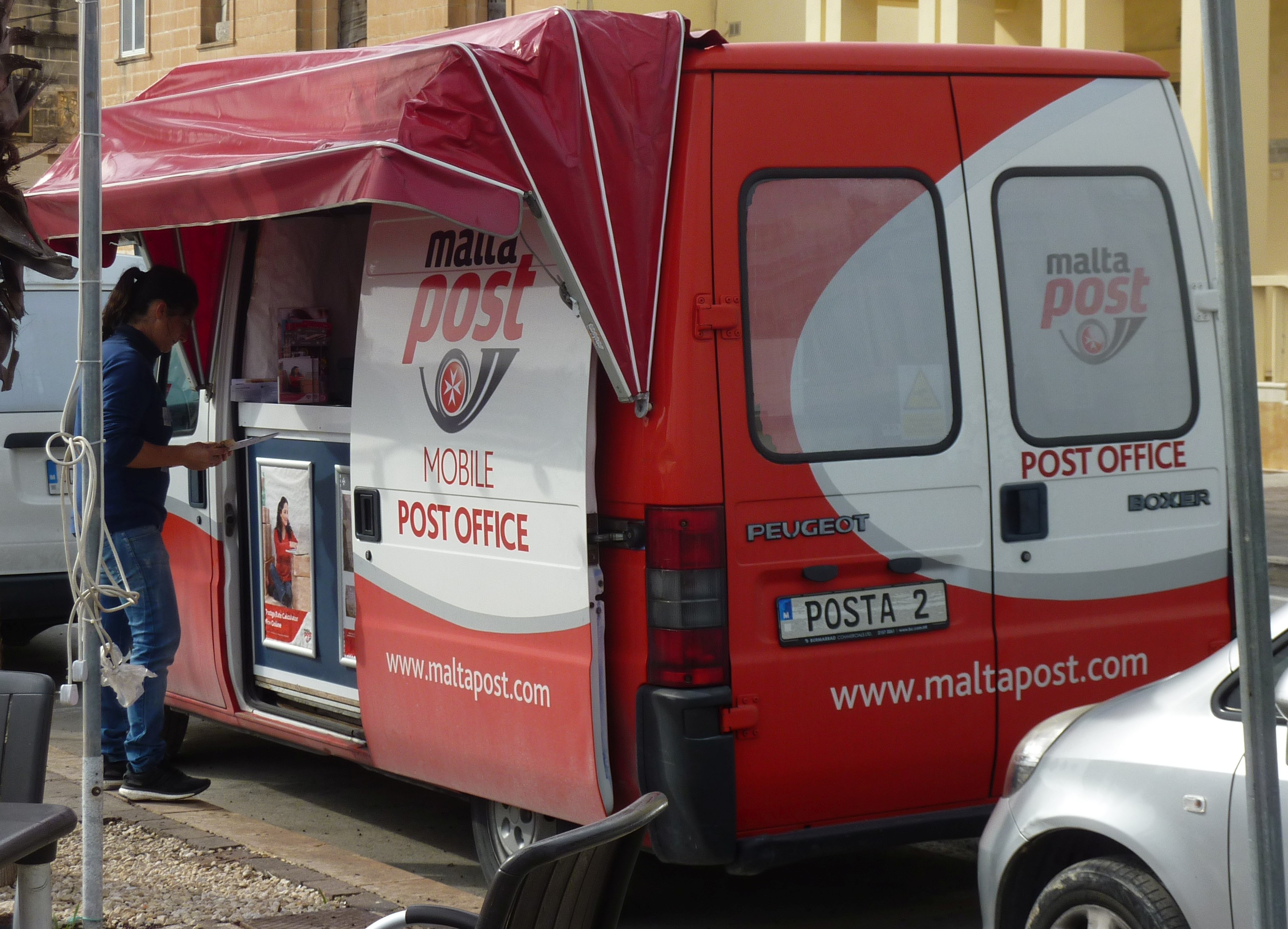
Mobile post office

== Privately owned vehicles ==
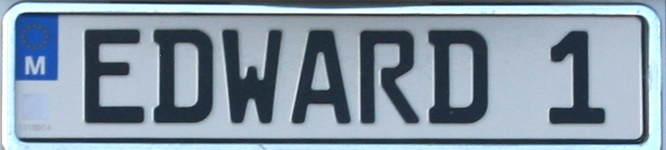
Personalised number plate

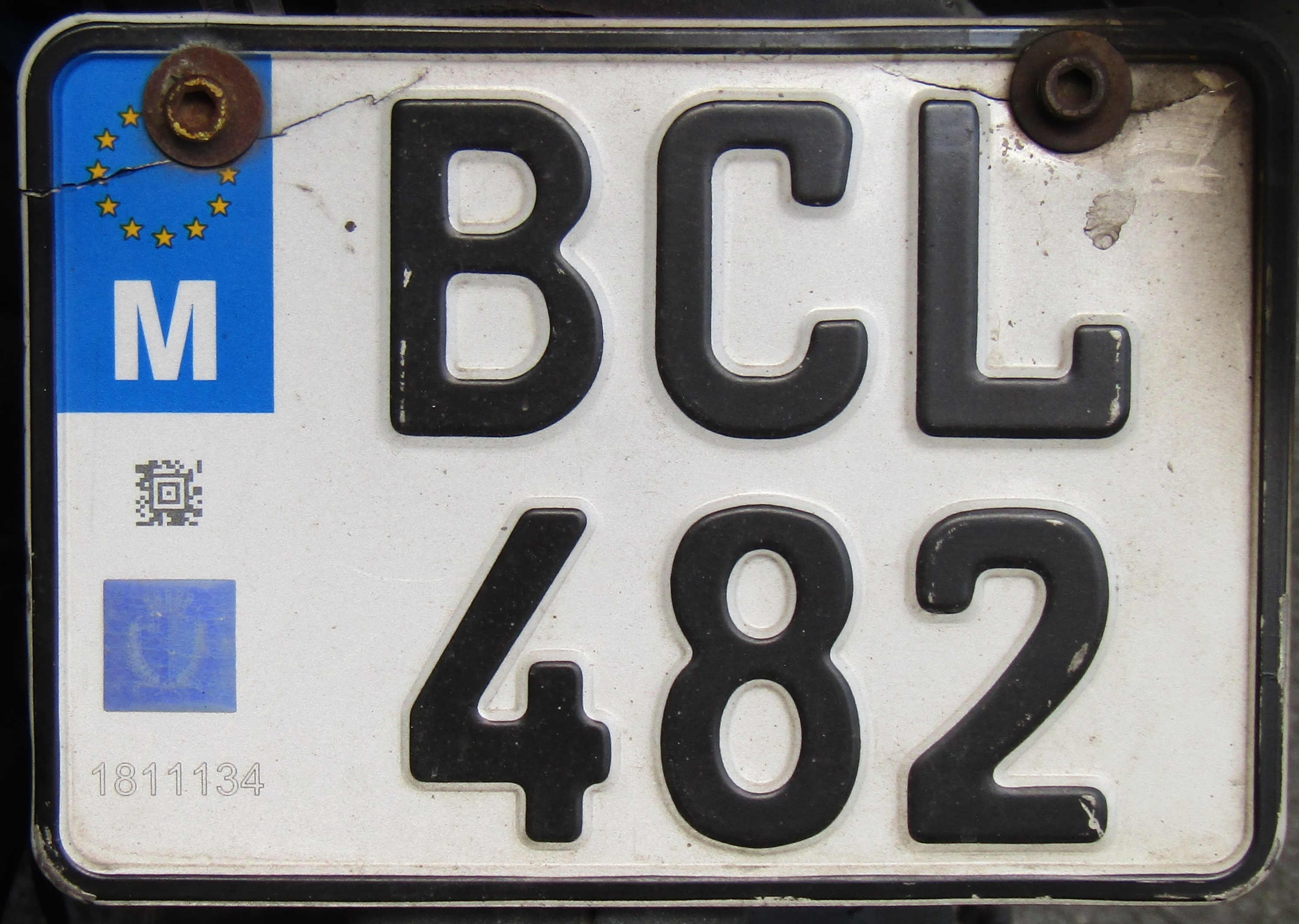
Motorcycle number plate

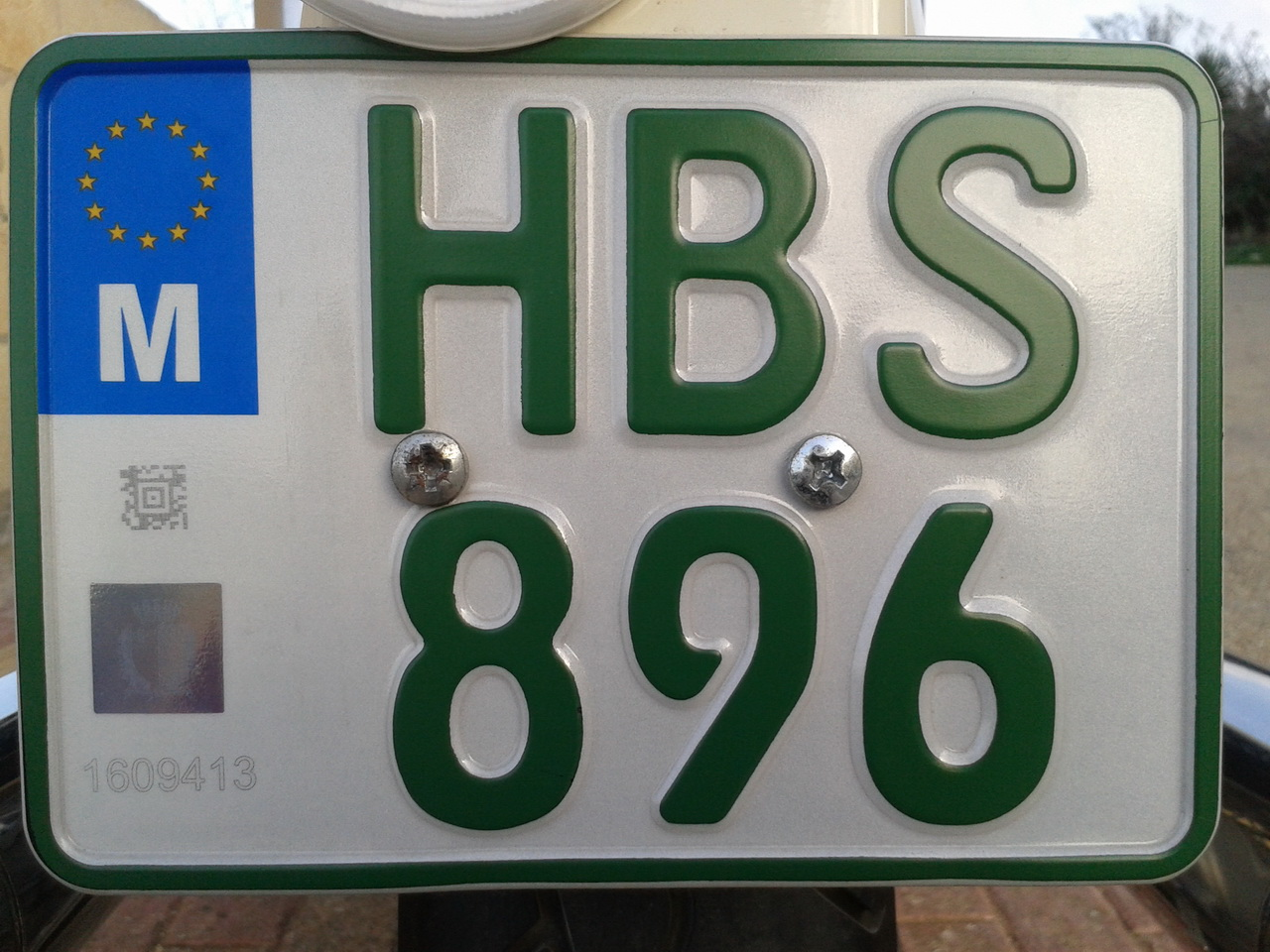
Malta Vintage Motorcycle Registration Plate

All privately owned vehicles are allocated randomly chosen marks, except that the first letter shows in which month the vehicle's annual tax disc is due for renewal.

The following is a table of letters by month:

Month			
January	A	M	Y
February	B	N	Z
March	C	O	
April	D	P	
May	E	Q	
June	F	R	
July	G	S	
August	H	T	
September	I	U	
October	J	V	
November	K	W	
December	L	X	

These plates may be also personalised in two ways: either in the XXX999 format (€200), or any combination from one to ten characters and/or numbers which would cost €1500.

== History ==
=== 1800s ===
A calesse, a type of horse carriage, had to be registered at the Castellania by the 19th century and use registration plates with black and white colours.

Motor vehicles were introduced in Malta around World War I in 1914. These were considered commodities and only the few people could purchase. The main people who owned the first cars were the British and the then higher class of Maltese. By 1919 most Brits started to sell their used cars to Maltese with an affordable price but were mainly used as taxis and for work-related needs such as the transport of goods.

=== 1952 - 1979 ===
1952–79 licence plate with black background

1952–79 licence plate with yellow background

From 1952 to 1979, all number-plates in Malta used the format 99999 (5 numbers). Until 1959, plates with red circle permitted to drive in Valletta. Unlike the post-1979 system, they have 7 characters. Special plates:

- Rental cars: Had a yellow background.
- Taxis/buses/coaches: all started with a TAXI (e.g. TAXI 001) and had a red background. While numbers all already used, then TAXI followed by a letter and two numbers (e.g. TAXI A01).
- Privately owned cars, scooters and motorbikes: Numbers only and had a black background.
- Diplomatic and tax exempt cars: all started with a CD (e.g. CD 1) and had a black background.

=== 1979 - 1995 ===
1979–95 licence plate

From 1979 to 1995, all number-plates in Malta used the format Z-9999 (a letter and 4 numbers, with a hyphen between the letter and the first number). Towards the right there was the letter M (for Malta) in a circle. Although all characters were printed in black, the background colour varied according to the vehicle's use:

- Rental cars: all started with an X (e.g. X-0001) and had a yellow background.
- Taxis/buses/minibuses/coaches: all started with a Y (e.g. Y-0001) and had a red background.
- Privately owned cars: characters were randomly chosen (i.e. all except for M, Z, X, P and Q) had a white background.
- Diplomatic and tax exempt cars: all started with a Z (e.g. Z-0001) and had a white background.
- Privately owned Scooters and Motorbikes: all started with a P or Q (e.g. P-0001) and had a white background. Unlike the current system, these had licence plates attached to both the front and rear.
