= Solaris Valletta =

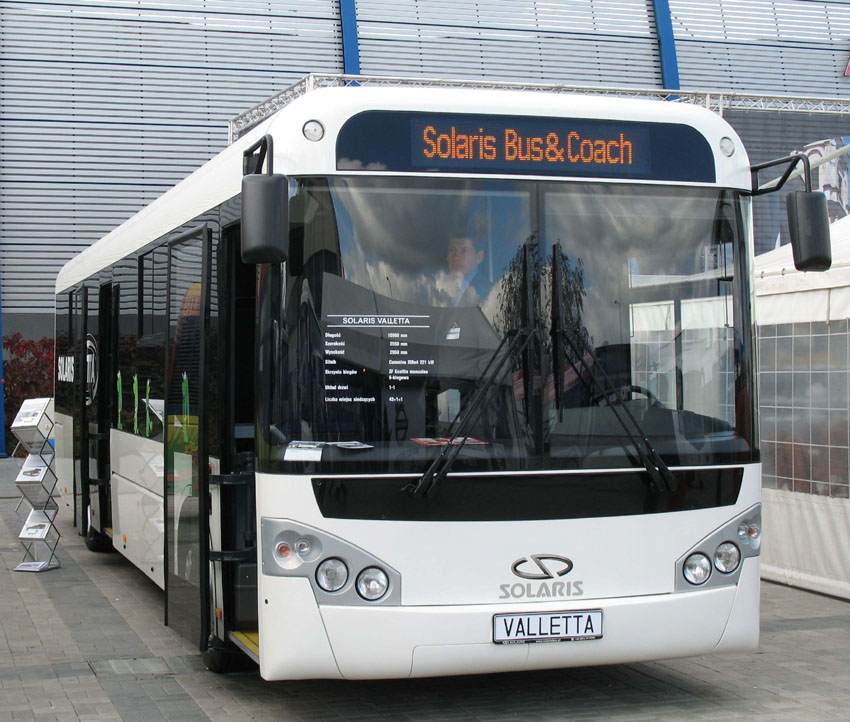

Overview
- Manufacturer: Solaris Bus & Coach
- Production: 2002-2003; 2007
- Assembly: Bolechowo, Poland

Body and chassis
- Class: Single-deck city-bus
- Doors: 2
- Floor type: Low entry

Powertrain
- Engine: 1) Cummins ISBe4 300; 2) DAF PF 183C; 3) Iveco NEF F4AE0681B
- Capacity: 45
- Power output: 1) 221 kW (300 KM); 2) 183 kW (250 KM); 3) 176 kW (240 KM)
- Transmission: Voith D851.3 (automatic); ZF Ecolite (manual)

Dimensions
- Length: 10.99 m
- Width: 2.55 m
- Height: 2.95 m

Solaris Valletta is a commercial name for the Solaris Urbino 11,001 bus. The bus was produced by the Polish company Solaris Bus & Coach in Bolechowo near Poznań in two versions, as a suburban or intercity public transportation bus. A total of four units were built.

== History ==
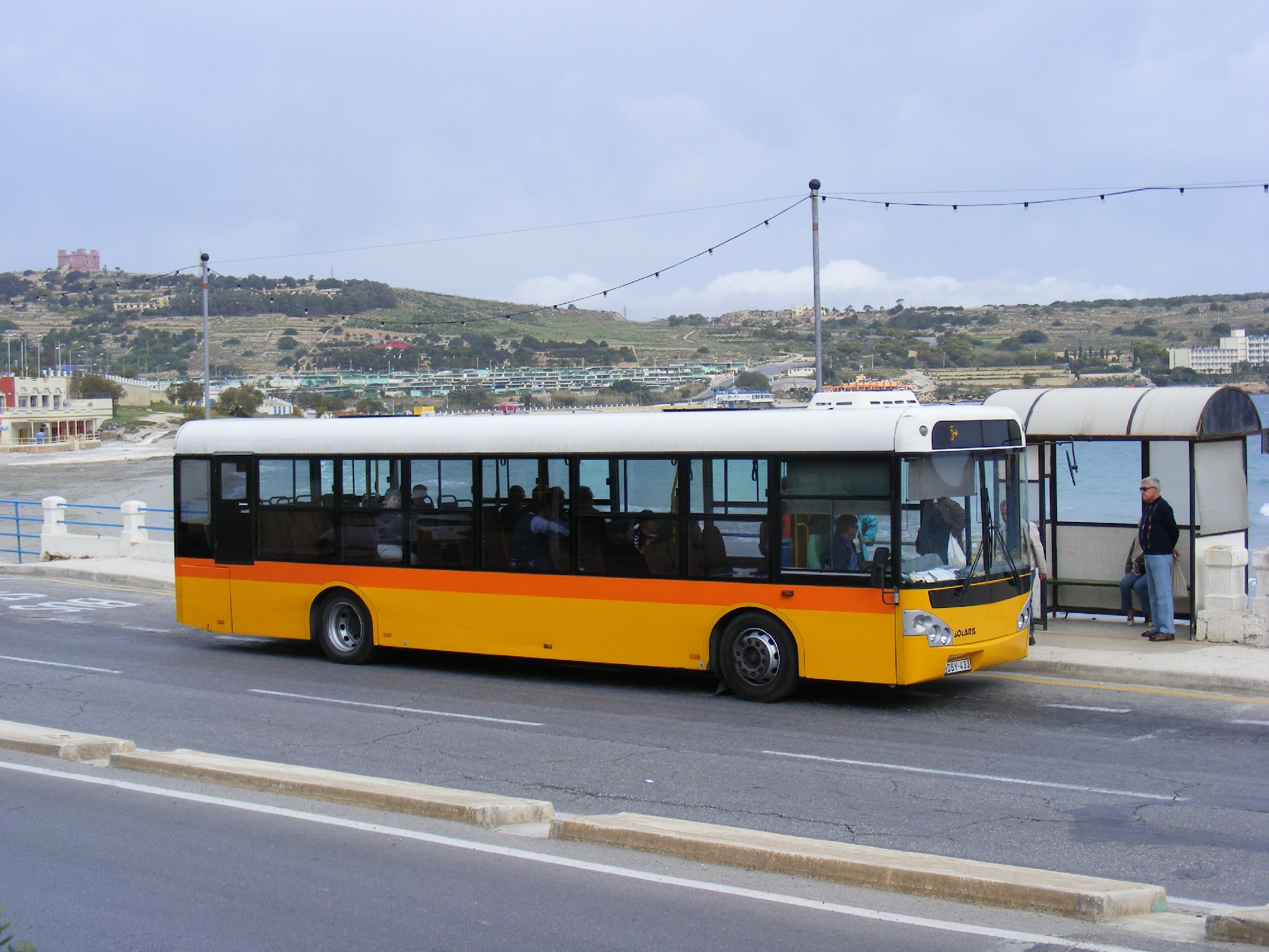
Solaris Valletta bus in Malta.

The first version of the low-entry Solaris Valletta bus model was produced in late 2002 and early 2003 for ATP (Assocjazzjoni Transport Pubbliku) in Ħamrun and to be used in the capital city of Malta. The company only built 3 units, and all were adapted for right-hand drive (RHD) in Malta. They use Iveco NEF F4AE0681B engines which qualify for Euro III with a cylinder capacity of 5.9 dm^{3} and a maximum power of 176 kW (240 hp), as an option, there was the DAF PF 183C engine with a maximum power of 183 kW (250 hp), the transmission was a three-speed Voith Diwa 851.3 automatic gearbox. The engine is mounted at the rear along the axle of the bus, and the power is transmitted to the rear axle by ZF A-132. The front suspension uses the ZF RL 85A. The bus is made out of stainless steel.
