= List of shipwrecks in October 1846 =

The list of shipwrecks in October 1846 includes ships sunk, foundered, wrecked, grounded, or otherwise lost during October 1846.

== 1 October ==
List of shipwrecks: 1 October 1846
Ship	State	Description
Deroz	Belgium	The ship capsized at sea. Her crew were rescued.
Esperance	United Kingdom	The ship ran aground on the Long Sand, in the North Sea off the coast of Essex, United Kingdom. She was on a voyage from Seaham, County Durham, United Kingdom to Bordeaux, Gironde. She was refloated the next day and taken in to Harwich, Essex. Subsequently repaired and returned to service.
Patriot	United Kingdom	The sloop was driven ashore on the Skerries of Ness, in the Orkney Islands. She was refloated the next day and taken in to Stromness in a leaky condition.
Uran	Austrian Empire	The brig was wrecked 30 nautical miles (56 km) south of Figueira da Foz, Portugal.

== 2 October ==
List of shipwrecks: 2 October 1846
Ship	State	Description
Agneda	United Kingdom	The ship was abandoned in the Atlantic Ocean. Her crew were rescued by St. Louis (France). Agneda was on a voyage from London to Miramichi, New Brunswick, British North America.
Catherine	United Kingdom	The transport ship was wrecked in Waterloo Bay.
Delphin	Russia	The ship ran aground off Ålsgårde, Denmark. She was on a voyage from St. Ubes, Portugal to Liepāja. She was refloated and resumed her voyage.
Greta Ellida	Norway	The ship sprang a leak and was abandoned off Oxoe. Her crew were rescued.

== 3 October ==
List of shipwrecks: 3 October 1846
Ship	State	Description
Ann	United Kingdom	The ship capsized at Newport, Monmouthshire. She was on a voyage from Plymouth, Devon to Newport. She was righted the next day.
Apparancen	Flag unknown	The brigantine was abandoned in the English Channel. She was driven ashore and wrecked at Beachy Head, Sussex, United Kingdom.
Etherley	United Kingdom	The ship ran aground in the River Shannon. She was on a voyage from Limerick to the Clyde. She was refloated and put back to Limerick.
Ida	Prussia	The sloop was wrecked on the Sunderschen Wiese. Her crew were rescued. She was on a voyage from Copenhagen, Denmark to Barth.
Ocean	United Kingdom	The brig was abandoned in the Atlantic Ocean 10 leagues (30 nautical miles (56 km)) north north west of the Isles of Scilly. Her crew were rescued by Margaret (United Kingdom) and she foundered. Ocean was on a voyage from Newport to Plymouth.

== 4 October ==
List of shipwrecks: 4 October 1846
Ship	State	Description
Auguste	Belgium	The ship was lost the Mediterranean Sea off Cette, Hérault, France.
Benoni	United Kingdom	The schooner was driven ashore in the Cattewater. She was later refloated and taken in to Plymouth, Devon.
Blessing	United Kingdom	The sloop ran aground at Great Yarmouth, Norfolk. She was on a voyage from Great Yarmouth to Boston, Lincolnshire.
Diligence	United Kingdom	The ship was driven ashore and wrecked at "Port Dye". Her crew were rescued.
Eddystone	Trinity House	The lighthouse tender was driven ashore and wrecked at Old Grimsby, Isles of Scilly.
Elie Marie	France	The ship was wrecked in Harlyn Bay. She was on a voyage from Newport, Monmouthshire, United Kingdom to Indret, Loire-Inférieure.
Forager	United Kingdom	The ship ran aground on the Buxey Sand, in the North Sea off the coast of Suffolk. She was refloated and put in to Harwich, Essex.
George	United Kingdom	The smack was driven ashore on Puffin Island, Anglesey. She was on a voyage from Newry, County Down to Runcorn, Cheshire. She was refloated and taken into Beaumaris, Anglesey.
Globe	France	The ship was driven ashore and wrecked south of Cape Henry, Virginia, United States.
Harmony	United Kingdom	The ship took on a pilot off Southwold, Suffolk. No further trace, presumed foundered with the loss of all on board. She was on a voyage from a Baltic port to Ipswich, Suffolk.
Isadora	United Kingdom	The brig struck rocks and was wrecked at Kinsale, County Cork with the loss of two of her crew. She was on a voyage from Newport, Monmouthshire to Tralee, County Kerry.
Laurel	United Kingdom	The ship was driven ashore near Kastrup, Denmark. She was on a voyage from Sunderland, County Durham to Saint Petersburg, Russia. She was refloated and resumed her voyage.
Newa	(United Kingdom of Great Britain and Ireland) Guernsey	The ship was driven ashore in Belgrave Bay, Guernsey.
Raven	United Kingdom	The ship was wrecked on Seskar, Russia. Her crew were rescued. She was on a voyage from Saint Petersburg to a Dutch port.
St. Christopher	United Kingdom	The ship was destroyed by fire 20 nautical miles (37 km) south of Agrigento, Sicily. Her crew were rescued. She was on a voyage from Antwerp, Belgium to Trieste.
Wesley	United Kingdom	The brig foundered 30 nautical miles (56 km) off Land's End, Cornwall. Her four crew were rescued the next day by New Friendship (United Kingdom). Wesley was on a voyage from Cardiff, Glamorgan to Hull, Yorkshire.

== 5 October ==
List of shipwrecks: October 1846
Ship	State	Description
Catherina	United Kingdom	The ship ran aground at Spurn Point, Yorkshire and was consequently beached at Easington. She was on a voyage from Newcastle upon Tyne, Northumberland to Rotterdam, South Holland, Netherlands. She was refloated on 9 October and taken in to Hull, Yorkshire.
Chartley Castle	United Kingdom	The ship was driven ashore in the Straits of Banca. She was on a voyage from Singapore to an English port. She was refloated on 11 October.
China	United Kingdom	The ship was wrecked on the Manicougan Shoals, in the Saint Lawrence River.
James Clark	United Kingdom	The ship was driven ashore on Brier Island, Nova Scotia, British North America. She was on a voyage from Saint John, New Brunswick, British North America to Philadelphia, Pennsylvania, United States. She was refloated and put in to Digby, Nova Scotia for repairs.
Jane Thompson	United Kingdom	The ship sprang a leak and was beached at Almería, Spain. She was on a voyage from Alexandria, Egypt to Cork.
Monica	United Kingdom	The ship was driven ashore at the Mumbles, Glamorgan. She was on a voyage from Swansea, Glamorgan to Deptford, Kent. She was refloated and towed in to Swansea.
Neva	(United Kingdom of Great Britain and Ireland) Jersey	The cutter was driven ashore in Belgrève Bay, Guernsey, Channel Islands.
Promethea	United Kingdom	The steamship was driven into London Bridge and was severely damaged. She was on a voyage from Cork to London.
Thomas	United Kingdom	The ship was beached at "Porthaven", Cornwall.

== 6 October ==
List of shipwrecks: 6 October 1846
Ship	State	Description
Charles Emelie	France	The ship ran aground on the Beacon Ridge, in the North Sea off the coast of Suffolk, United Kingdom. She floated off and sank. Her crew were rescued.
Chimera	United Kingdom	The ship struck a sunken rock off "Mosiltimo Island". She was on a voyage from Zante, Greece to Falmouth, Cornwall. She put in to "Traham", Sicily for repairs.
Diamond	United Kingdom	The paddle steamer struck the wreck of Lady Faversham (United Kingdom) and foundered off South Shields, County Durham. She was refloated on 8 October.
Earl of Lonsdale	United Kingdom	The paddle steamer ran aground at the entrance to the Belfast Lough. She was on a voyage from Whitehaven, Cumberland to Belfast, County Antrim. She was refloated.
Edward	Lübeck	The brig was driven ashore at "Holyland". She was on a voyage from "Wyburg" to Cette, Hérault, France. She was refloated and put in to Copenhagen, Denmark in a leaky condition.
Helen	United Kingdom	The ship was driven ashore at Sligo. Her crew were rescued. She was on a voyage from Quebec City, Province of Canada, British North America to Sligo. She was refloated on 18 October.
Leopoldina	Stettin	The ship ran aground on the Kentish Knock. She was on a voyage from Stettin to Bordeaux, Gironde, France. Leopoldine was refloated the next day and taken in to Ramsgate, Kent, United Kingdom in a waterlogged condition.
Oscar	Sweden	The sloop ran aground and was wrecked off the Swedish coast.
Wards	United Kingdom	The ship was driven ashore at Höganäs, Gotland, Sweden. She was on a voyage from Blyth, Northumberland to Kronstadt, Russia. She was refloated the next day and resumed her voyage.

== 7 October ==
List of shipwrecks: 7 October 1846
Ship	State	Description
Benoni	United Kingdom	The ship ran aground on the Queen Anne's Battery Reef, off the Devon coast. She was refloated.
Don	United Kingdom	The ship was driven ashore at New Grimsby, Isles of Scilly. She was refloated.
Felicity	France	The ship was abandoned in the Bay of Biscay. She came ashore at Saint-Jean-de-Monts, Vendée.
Norman Morrison	(United Kingdom of Great Britain and Ireland) Burma	The full-rigged ship capsized at Moulmein and drifted out to sea. She was subsequently righted and taken in to "Nantmoo" by the steamship Proserpine (United Kingdom).
Ocean	Sweden	The ship ran aground off "Westergarn", Gotland. She was on a voyage from Gävle to New York City, United States. She was refloated and resumed her voyage.
Selene	Prussia	The ketch was lost in the English Channel off the coast of Sussex.
Simpson	United Kingdom	The brig was driven ashore in the Cattewater. She was on a voyage from Odesa to Plymouth. She was refloated.
Union	France	The ship was driven ashore on Guernsey, Channel Islands. Her crew were rescued. She was on a voyage from Rouen, Seine Maritime to Brest, Finistère
Wave	United Kingdom	The ship ran aground on the Barber Sand, in the North Sea off the coast of Norfolk. She was on a voyage from Stettin to London. She was refloated and taken in to Great Yarmouth, Norfolk in a leaky condition.
William	United Kingdom	The brig ran aground on the Scroby Sands, Norfolk. She was on a voyage from Arkhangelsk, Russia to London. She was refloated with assistance from the yawls John and Leveret (both United Kingdom) and taken in to Great Yarmouth.

== 8 October ==
List of shipwrecks: October 1846
Ship	State	Description
Constantine	United States	The ship ran aground on the Meeirs Leegde, in the North Sea. She was later refloated.
Helen	United Kingdom	The ship was driven ashore at Lower Rosses Point, County Sligo. She was refloated on 18 October.
Helen and Margaret	United Kingdom	The ship ran aground in the River Lee. She was on a voyage from Cork to Newport, Monmouthshire. she was refloated the next day.
Norman Morrison	(United Kingdom of Great Britain and Ireland) Burma	The ship capsized at Moulmein and drifted out to sea. She was subsequently righted and towed in to "Nantmoo" by Prosperous (United Kingdom).
Rattler	United Kingdom	The steamship sprang a leak in the Irish Sea 30 nautical miles (56 km) off Cork. Her passengers were taken off in the Carrick Roads and she put in to Falmouth, Cornwall where she was beached. She was on a voyage from Cork to London.
Robert Bruce	United Kingdom	The ship was wrecked on the Île d'Oléron, Charente-Maritime, France. She was on a voyage from Belfast, County Antrim to Bordeaux, Gironde, France.
Sophia	Duchy of Holstein	The kuff was driven ashore on Amrum. She was refloated and taken in to Hörnum.

== 9 October ==
List of shipwrecks: 9 October 1846
Ship	State	Description
Ada	United Kingdom	The ship ran aground at Bannow, County Wexford, She was on a voyage from Liverpool, Lancashire to Livorno, Grand Duchy of Tuscany. She was refloated on 26 October and taken in to Waterford.
Aurora	Kingdom of Hanover	The ship collided with Ocean (United Kingdom) and was abandoned off Ilfracombe, Devon, United Kingdom. Her crew were rescued by Ocean. Aurora was on a voyage from Cardiff, Glamorgan, United Kingdom to Hamburg. She was taken in to Swansea, Glamorgan on 21 October in a derelict condition.
Frau Hüka	Bremen	The ship was driven ashore west of Teignmouth, Devon, United Kingdom.. She was on a voyage from Bremen to Port St. Mary, Isle of Man. She was refloated and taken in to Teignmouth for repairs, but was condemned.
Glenlyon	United Kingdom	The ship was wrecked at Salt Creek, in the Bay of Honduras.
Greenwood	United Kingdom	The brig foundered in the North Sea 12 nautical miles (22 km) north of the Dudgeon sandbank. Her crew were rescued by Golden Grove (United Kingdom). Greenwood was on a voyage from Seaham, County Durham to Great Yarmouth, Norfolk.
Templeman	United Kingdom	The ship was driven ashore at Kilmore, County Wexford. All 26 people on board were rescued. She was on a voyage from Valparaíso, Chile to Liverpool, Lancashire. She was refloated on 6 November.
Thomas and Hannah	United Kingdom	The ship was wrecked in the Bay of Honduras.

== 10 October ==
List of shipwrecks: 10 October 1846
Ship	State	Description
Andromeda	United Kingdom	The ship was driven ashore at Tobermory, Isle of Mull, Outer Hebrides. Her crew were rescued. She was on a voyage from Onega, Russia to Bristol, Gloucestershire. She was refloated on 28 October.
Bosphorus	United Kingdom	The ship was driven ashore and severely damaged on Tresco, Isles of Scilly. She was on a voyage from Liverpool, Lancashire to Constantinople, Ottoman Empire. She was refloated.
Bristol	United Kingdom	The barque capsized in the Atlantic Ocean and was abandoned. Her ten crew were rescued by Dauphin (France). Bristol was on a voyage from Portsmouth, Hampshire to Saint John, New Brunswick, British North America. Bristol was towed in to Socoa, Basses-Pyrénées, France on 30 October in a derelict condition.
Emerald	United Kingdom	The schooner ran aground in the Droogden, in the Baltic Sea. She was on a voyage from Liverpool, Lancashire to Riga, Russia. She was refloated the next day and resumed her voyage.
Galatea	United Kingdom	The ship was driven ashore and wrecked in Mossel Bay.
Jane A. Milvain	United Kingdom	The ship was driven ashore on Scatterie Island, Nova Scotia, British North America She was on a voyage from the Saint Lawrence River to Newcastle upon Tyne, Northumberland. She was refloated and resumed her voyage.
Loch Ryan	United Kingdom	The steamship foundered in the North Sea off Texel, North Holland, Netherlands with the loss of one of the twenty people on board. Survivors were rescued by the barques Delphin (Norway) and Swan (Sweden). Loch Ryan was on a voyage from Rotterdam, South Holland, Netherlands to London.
Monmouth	United Kingdom	The schooner was driven ashore on "Corriente Island". She was on a voyage from Patras, Greece to London. She was refloated and taken in to Syracuse, Sicily for repairs.
USS Perry	United States Navy	The brig was driven onto the Bahia Hond Key in a hurricane. All on board survived. She was subsequently refloated, repaired and returned to service.
Swift	United Kingdom	The ship was driven ashore at Laytown, County Meath.
Thomas and Hannah	United Kingdom	The ship ran aground on the Gunfleet Sand, in the North Sea off the coast of Essex. She was on a voyage from London to Sunderland, County Durham. She was refloated.
Verwachting	Netherlands	The ship was abandoned in the North Sea. Her crew were rescued She was on a voyage from Odense, Denmark to a Dutch port.
Watson	United Kingdom	The ship struck a sunken rock off Kyle of Lochalsh, Argyllshire and was holed. She was on a voyage from Wick, Caithness to Dublin. She put into Tobermory, Mull for repairs.

== 11 October ==
List of shipwrecks: 11 October 1846
Ship	State	Description
Adela	Spain	The schooner was damaged in a hurricane at Havana, Cuba.
Æolos	Denmark	The brig was damaged in a hurricane at Havana.
Agnes Jane	United Kingdom	The barque was driven ashore and severely damaged in a hurricane at Havana. She was consequently condemned.
Amelie Raymond	France	The brig was wrecked in a hurricane at Havana.
Amfitrite	Spain	The barque was lost in a hurricane at Havana.
Andromede	French Navy	The frigate was driven ashore and damaged in a hurricane at Havana.
Apollo	Spain	The brig was severely damaged in a hurricane at Havana.
Arispe	Flag unknown	The ship was damaged in a hurricane at Havana and was consequently condemned.
Bazan	Spanish Navy	The steamship was driven ashore in a hurricane at Havana.
Bernhardt	Denmark	The full-rigged ship was damaged in a hurricane at Havana.
Blandford	United Kingdom	The brig was driven ashore on Langeoog, Kingdom of Hanover. She was on a voyage from Sunderland, County Durham to Hamburg.
Blonde	French Navy	The corvette was driven ashore and wrecked in a hurricane at Havana.
Brilliante	Spain	The brig was damaged in a hurricane at Havana. She was consequently condemned.
Britannia	(United Kingdom of Great Britain and Ireland) British North America	The brig was abandoned in a hurricane off Cuba.
Cecilia	Spain	The brig was damaged in a hurricane at Havana. She was consequently condemned.
Centauro	Spain	The brig was severely damaged in a hurricane at Havana.
Charleston	Bremen	The barque was severely damaged in a hurricane at Havana.
Childe Harold	United States	The full-rigged ship was driven ashore and severely damaged in a hurricane at Havana.
Colon	Spain	The brig was damaged in a hurricane at Havana and was consequently condemned.
Conchita	Spain	The barque was damaged in a hurricane at Havana.
Constitución	Spanish Navy	The brig was sunk in a hurricane at Havana.
Correo	Spain	The brig was sunk in a hurricane at Havana.
Courrier	Netherlands	The barque capsized in a hurricane at Havana. She was consequently condemned.
Creole	Spanish Navy	The schooner was sunk in a hurricane at Havana. She was consequently condemned.
Criollo	Spain	The schooner was sunk in a hurricane at Havana.
Cumberland	United States	The brig was damaged in a hurricane at Havana.
Cybelle	United States	The brig was driven ashore in a hurricane at Havana.
Duff	United Kingdom	The ship ran aground at Portsmouth, Hampshire. She was on a voyage from Portsmouth to Hartlepool, County Durham. She was refloated and put back to Portsmouth.
Ebro	Spain	The brig was sunk in a hurricane at Havana. She was consequently condemned.
Echo	United States	The brig was driven sunk in a hurricane at Havana.
Eden	United Kingdom	The ship was driven ashore in a hurricane at Key West, Florida, United States.
Edward Hayes	United Kingdom	The barque was sunk in a hurricane at Havana. She was consequently condemned.
Elizabeth Walker	United Kingdom	The ship was destroyed by fire off the Anambas Islands. Her crew were rescued. She was on a voyage from Bombay, India to Singapore and China.
Emamala	Spain	The brig sank in a hurricane at Havana.
Eolo	Spain	The brig was severely damaged in a hurricane at Havana.
Fama Cabana Perez	Spain	The full-rigged ship was wrecked in a hurricane at Havana.
Fantasma	Brazil	The brig was wrecked in a hurricane at Havana.
Flor	Spain	The brig was severely damaged in a hurricane at Havana.
General Warren	United States	The schooner was driven ashore in a hurricane at Havana.
Guadeloupe	Spanish Navy	The steamship was driven ashore in a hurricane at Havana.
Habanera	Spanish Navy	The schooner was sunk in a hurricane at Havana.
Habanero	Spanish Navy	The brig was driven ashore and damaged in a hurricane at Havana.
Hermosa Habanera	Spain	The brig was damaged in a hurricane at Havana.
Herschel	Bremen	The brig was damaged in a hurricane at Havana.
Infanta	Spanish Navy	The schooner was driven ashore in a hurricane at "d'Atares", Cuba.
Isabella	United States	The schooner was sunk in a hurricane at Havana.
Iowa	United States	The full-rigged ship was driven ashore in a hurricane at Havana.
Jason	France	The barque was lost in a hurricane at Havana. She was consequently condemned.
Juanita	Spanish Navy	The brigantine was driven ashore and wrecked in a hurricane at Havana.
Julio	Spain	The brig was severely damaged in a hurricane at Havana.
Laborde	Spanish Navy	The brig was driven ashore and wrecked in a hurricane at Havana.
Lisbon	United States	The brig was damaged in a hurricane at Havana.
Loquere Serena No. 2	Spain	The ship was damaged in a hurricane at Havana and was consequently condemned.
Madeline	United States	The full-rigged ship was sunk in a hurricane at Havana. She was consequently condemned.
Magdalena	United Kingdom	The schooner was severely damaged in a hurricane at Havana. She was consequently condemned.
Maria	Spain	The brig was damaged in a hurricane at Havana.
Marie	France	The barque was damaged in a hurricane at Havana.
Matanzas	Spain	The steamship was wrecked in a hurricane at Havana.
Merchant	United States	The schooner was lost in a hurricane at Havana. She was consequently condemned.
Millenoket	United States	The brig was severely damaged in a hurricane at Havana. She was consequently condemned.
Minstrel	United Kingdom	The brig was severely damaged in a hurricane at Havana.
Mohawk	United States	The brig was driven ashore and wrecked in a hurricane at Havana. She was consequently condemned.
Montezuma	Spanish Navy	The steamship was driven ashore and severely damaged in a hurricane at Havana.
USS Morris	United States Navy	The schooner was wrecked in a hurricane at Key West, Florida.
Mudara	United States	The barque was lost in a hurricane at Havana.
Nancy Pratts	United States	The brig was damaged in a hurricane at Havana.
Neptune	United States	The brig was driven ashore in a hurricane at Havana.
Nervion	Spanish Navy	The brig was driven ashore and damaged in a hurricane at Havana.
Nichol Brown	United States	The barque was driven ashore in a hurricane at Havana.
Norval	United Kingdom	The brig was wrecked in a hurricane at Havana.
Novel	United Kingdom	The brig was sunk in a hurricane at Havana. She was consequently condemned.
Oak	United States	The brig was damaged in a hurricane at Havana. She was consequently condemned.
Œolus	Denmark	The brig was damaged in a hurricane at Havana. She was subsequently repaired.
Onerida	Spain	The full-rigged ship was damaged in a hurricane at Havana.
Pasiaga	Flag unknown	The ship was damaged in a hurricane at Havana and was consequently condemned.
Patriot Mina	Russia	The barque was driven ashore and damaged in a hurricane at Havana. She was consequently condemned.
Paquete de Guatemala	Spain	The schooner was sunk in a hurricane at Havana. She was consequently condemned.
Paquete de Santa Cruz	Spain	The brig was lost in a hurricane at Havana.
Paquete Serena	Spain	The barque was lost in a hurricane at Havana.
Patriota	Spanish Navy	The ship was damaged in a hurricane at Havana.
Pelicano	Spain	The brig was sunk in a hurricane at Havana.
Pepita	Spain	The barque was severely damaged in a hurricane at Havana.
Polka	Spanish Navy	The schooner was sunk in a hurricane at Havana.
Planet	United States	The schooner was lost in a hurricane at Havana.
Primera de Guatemala	Spain	The barque was damaged in a hurricane at Havana.
Princess Caroline Amalia	Denmark	The brig was lost in a hurricane at Havana.
Princess Royal	United Kingdom	The ship was driven ashore at Starcross, Devon. She was on a voyage from Quebec City, Province of Canada, British North America to Starcross. She was refloated on 14 October.
Prinsesse Caroline Amelia	Denmark	The brig was sunk in a hurricane at Havana. She was consequently condemned.
Prompt	United Kingdom	The brig was driven ashore and severely damaged in a hurricane at Havana. She was subsequently repaired.
Querida	Spain	The full-rigged ship was severely damaged in a hurricane at Havana.
Ramke	Bremen	The brig was damaged in a hurricane at Havana.
Rapid	United States	The full-rigged ship capsized in a hurricane at Havana. She was subsequently righted.
Regia	Spain	The steamship was wrecked in a hurricane at Havana.
Réunion	France	The ship was wrecked on the Florida Reef in a hurricane. Her crew were rescued.
Robert	United Kingdom	The ship was driven ashore on Langeoog. Her crew were rescued. She was on a voyage from Newcastle upon Tyne, Northumberland to Amsterdam, North Holland, Netherlands.
Rodney	Spanish Navy	The former Vengeur-class ship of the line collided with Thames (United Kingdom), destroying her pinnace, and was driven ashore at Havana.
Rosalie	Belgium	The brig sank in a hurricane at Havana.
Salitor	Spanish Navy	The steamship was driven ashore in a hurricane at Havana.
San José	Spain	The brig was damaged in a hurricane at Havana.
Segunda Manuela	Spain	The schooner was driven out to sea from Havana in a hurricane. No further trace, presumed foundered.
Serafina	Spain	The brig was lost in a hurricane at Havana. She was consequently condemned.
Smyrna	United States	The brig was damaged in a hurricane at Havana.
Sturara	Flag unknown	The ship was damaged in a hurricane at Havana. She was consequently condemned.
Susan	United Kingdom	The brig was damaged in a hurricane at Havana.
Titi	United States	The brig was severely damaged in a hurricane at Havana.
Tonnere	French Navy	The steam corvette was driven ashore in a hurricane at Havana.
Triumfo	Spain	The brig was severely damaged in a hurricane at Havana. She was consequently condemned.
Trueno	Spanish Navy	The quarantine hulk, a brig, was driven ashore and wrecked in a hurricane at Havana.
Venezuela	United States	The brig was damaged in a hurricane at Havana.
Victoria	Russia	The ship barque driven on to a reef in a hurricane at Havana.
Villa Nueva	Spain	The schooner was wrecked in a hurricane with the loss of twenty lives.
Vincidero	Spain	The ship was wrecked in a hurricane on Key Vacas, Florida.
Warsaw	United States	The ship was wrecked on the Florida Reef in a hurricane. Her crew were rescued. She was on a voyage from Mobile, Alabama, to Brest, Finistère, France.
William Murray	United Kingdom	The brig was damaged in a hurricane at Havana. She was consequently condemned.
Wilson	United Kingdom	The brig was damaged in a hurricane at Havana.

== 12 October ==
List of shipwrecks: 12 October 1846
Ship	State	Description
Admiral Howe	United Kingdom	The ship ran aground 5 nautical miles (9.3 km) off Blåvand, Denmark. She was on a voyage from Stockton-on-Tees, County Durham to Hamburg.
Agnes	United Kingdom	The ship was driven ashore and wrecked in the Saint Lawrence River.
Cherub	(United Kingdom of Great Britain and Ireland) Dominica	The schooner was driven ashore at "Charlotte Ville".
Childe Harold	(United Kingdom of Great Britain and Ireland) Dominica	The sloop was driven out to sea from Dominica. No further trace.
Clipper	(United Kingdom of Great Britain and Ireland) Dominica	The sloop was driven out to sea from Dominica. No further trace.
Elizabeth	United Kingdom	The ship was abandoned in the Atlantic Ocean (46°12′N 41°04′W). Her crew were rescued by Mary Seaton (United Kingdom. Elizabeth was on a voyage from Saint Stephen, New Brunswick to Liverpool, Lancashire.
Elswick	United Kingdom	The ship was driven ashore at Skinningrove, Yorkshire. Her crew were rescued. She was on a voyage from Rouen, Seine-Inférieure, France to South Shields, County Durham. Elswick was refloated on 20 October and taken in to the River Tees.
Fox	United Kingdom	The smack sprang a leak and sank off Whitby, Yorkshire. Her crew survived. She was on a voyage from Grangemouth, Stirlingshire to Rouen.
Frank	United Kingdom	The ship was abandoned in the English Channel 20 nautical miles (37 km) off the Isle of Wight. Her crew were rescued. She was on a voyage from London to Rouen.
George	United Kingdom	The schooner was driven ashore on Scharhörn and was abandoned by her crew. She was on a voyage from Grangemouth, Stirlingshire to Rotterdam, South Holland, Netherlands. She was refloated and taken in to Glückstadt, Duchy of Schleswig.
Hope	United Kingdom	The schooner was driven ashore and severely damaged at Seaton Delaval, County Durham. She was refloated on 17 October and taken in to Hartlepool, County Durham.
Never Despair	(United Kingdom of Great Britain and Ireland) Saint Lucia	The sloop was driven ashore and wrecked on the Cabrittes.
Pirate	(United Kingdom of Great Britain and Ireland) Saint Lucia	The sloop was driven ashore at Layon.
Queensbury	United Kingdom	The schooner ran aground and was wrecked on the Burbo Bank, in Liverpool Bay. Her crew were rescued by the Magazines Lifeboat. She was on a voyage from Dumfries to Liverpool, Lancashire. Queensbury was refloated on 15 October and beached near the Magazines.
Robert	(United Kingdom of Great Britain and Ireland) Dominica	The cutter was blown out to sea from Dominica. No further trace.
Salvador	(United Kingdom of Great Britain and Ireland) Dominica	The sloop was blown out to sea from Dominica. No further trace.
Sampson	United Kingdom	The steam tug sank at King's Lynn, Norfolk. She was refloated on 15 October.
Sam Slick	(United Kingdom of Great Britain and Ireland) Dominica	The schooner was driven out to sea from Dominica. No further trace.
HMS Stromboli	Royal Navy	The paddle sloop struck rocks at the mouth of the River Shannon and was damaged. She was refloated and was subsequently ordered to Plymouth, Devon for repairs.
Stuart Monteith	United Kingdom	The smack ran aground and was wrecked on the Burbo Bank. Her crew were rescued by the Magazines Lifeboat. She was on a voyage from Dumfries to Liverpool. Stuart Monteith was refloated on 15 October and beached near the Magazines.
William Stewart	(United Kingdom of Great Britain and Ireland) Antigua	The ship was wrecked at "Toncarie".

== 13 October ==
List of shipwrecks: 13 October 1846
Ship	State	Description
Aimwell	United Kingdom	The ship ran aground on the Haisborough Sands, in the North Sea off the coast of Norfolk. She was refloated but consequently foundered off Lowestoft, Suffolk. Her crew were rescued.
Amethyst	United Kingdom	The schooner was run foul of and damaged in a hurricane at Portland, Maine, United States.
Anwell	United Kingdom	The ship was driven ashore south of Grimsby, Lincolnshire.
Astrea	United Kingdom	The ship sprang a leak and sank in the North Sea 15 nautical miles (28 km) off Spurn Point, Yorkshire. Her crew were rescued. She was on a voyage from Stockholm, Sweden to Hull, Yorkshire.
Bear Park	United Kingdom	The ship was driven ashore and wrecked at Blakeney, Norfolk. Her crew were rescued.
Bellona	United Kingdom	The smack was wrecked on the Bognor Rocks, in the English Channel off the coast of Sussex. Her crew were rescued. She was on a voyage from Liverpool, Lancashire to London.
Conqueror	United Kingdom	The ship was damaged in a gale at Charleston, South Carolina, United States. She was on a voyage from Charleston to Liverpool.
Eliza	United Kingdom	The sloop capsized in the North Sea off Brancaster, Norfolk. Her crew were rescued.
Esther Ann	(United Kingdom of Great Britain and Ireland) Bahamas	The schooner was driven ashore in a hurricane in Grand Bay, Turks Islands.
Europe	Norway	The ship was abandoned in the North Sea. Her crew survived. She was on a voyage from Dram to Amsterdam, North Holland, Netherlands.
Elizabeth	United Kingdom	The ship was abandoned in the Atlantic Ocean. Her crew were rescued. She was on a voyage from Saint Stephen, New Brunswick, British North America to Liverpool.
Governor Matthew	(United Kingdom of Great Britain and Ireland) Turks Islands	The schooner was driven ashore and damaged in a hurricane in the Turks Islands.
Haabet	Norway	The ship was driven ashore and wrecked near Lilleheden, Denmark. Her crew were rescued. She was on a voyage from Christianstad to Cette, Hérault, France.
Independent	United Kingdom	The ship ran aground and sank at South Shields, County Durham. She was on a voyage from Quebec City, Province of Canada, British North America to South Shields.
Janet and John	United Kingdom	The sloop was driven ashore in a capsized condition at Staithes, Yorkshire. Her crew presumed drowned.
Jean	United Kingdom	The sloop was driven ashore on Blockhouse Island, County Antrim and was severely damaged. She was refloated and taken in to Warrenpoint, County Down, where she sank.
Lady Colebrook	(United Kingdom of Great Britain and Ireland) Saint Lucia	The sloop was driven ashore at "Prince Rupert's". Her crew were rescued.
Lerwick	United Kingdom	The schooner was driven ashore at Skinningrove, Yorkshire. Her crew were rescued.
Margaret	United Kingdom	The schooner was damaged in a hurricane at New York, United States.
Mariana	Hamburg	The ship ran aground on the Horne Sand. Her crew were rescued. She was on a voyage from Hamburg to "Holbeck".
New York Packet	United Kingdom	The brig was damaged in a hurricane at New York.
Paran	(United Kingdom of Great Britain and Ireland) Turks Islands	The sloop was driven ashore and wrecked in a hurricane in the Turks Islands.
Portia	United Kingdom	The ship was driven ashore at Näsby, Sweden. She was on a voyage from Vyborg, Sweden to Gloucester. She was refloated and resumed her voyage.
Prancer	United Kingdom	The ship was driven ashore and wrecked near Machias, Maine, United States. She was on a voyage from Boston, Massachusetts, United States to Saint John, New Brunswick, British North America.
Prince de Joinville	United Kingdom	The brig was driven into the brig St. Margaret (United Kingdom and was damaged in a hurricane at New York.
Providence	United Kingdom	The ship was driven ashore at Skegness, Lincolnshire. She was on a voyage from London to Fosdyke Bridge, Lincolnshire.
Puritan	United Kingdom	The brig was damaged iun a hurricane at New York.
Roscius	United States	The ship was damaged in a hurricane at New York.
St. Partick	United Kingdom	The brig was damaged in a hurricane at New York.
Thea	United Kingdom	The ship was in collision with another vessel in the North Sea. She was consequently beached at Sheerness, Kent.
Victoria	United Kingdom	The schooner was damaged in a hurricane at New York.
William	United Kingdom	The schooner was wrecked on the Cannon Rock, at the entrance to Strangford Lough with the presumed loss of all hands.

== 14 October ==
List of shipwrecks: 14 October 1846
Ship	State	Description
Augustus	Dominican Republic	The sloop was driven out to sea from Sand Bay, Turks Islands in a hurricane. No further trace.
Bertha	Prussia	The ship was driven ashore and wrecked north of Rønne, Denmark. Her crew were rescued.
Correo № 3	Spain	The ship was abandoned in the Atlantic Ocean. All on board were rescued. She was on a voyage from Havana, Cuba to Cádiz.
Bradshaw	United Kingdom	The barque was driven ashore and wrecked near Porthcawl, Glamorgan. Her crew were rescued. She was on a voyage from Saint John, New Brunswick, British North America to Liverpool, Lancashire.
Brother's Friend	United Kingdom	The ship ran aground in Pegwell Bay. She was on a voyage from South Shields, County Durham to Rouen, Seine-Inférieure, France. She was refloated and taken in to Ramsgate, Kent, where she sank.
Eden	United Kingdom	The ship was driven ashore and wrecked at Quarry Cove, Devon. She was on a voyage from Newcastle upon Tyne, Northumberland to Almería, Spain.
Ellen	United Kingdom	The smack was driven ashore at Breaksea Point, Glamorgan.
Emily Cummings	United States	The brig was driven ashore and wrecked in a hurricane in Salt Bay, Turks Islands.
Gleaner	United Kingdom	The ship was driven ashore and sank at Deal, Kent. Her crew were rescued. She was on a voyage from Middlesbrough, Yorkshire to Torquay, Devon.
Janet	United Kingdom	The brig was driven ashore at Skipsea, Yorkshire. Her crew were rescued. She was on a voyage from Saint John, New Brunswick, British North America to Hull, Yorkshire. Janet had been dismantled in situ by 29 October.
Latona	United Kingdom	The ship was driven ashore and wrecked at Ness Point, Suffolk. Her crew were rescued. She was on a voyage from Boulogne, Pas-de-Calais, France to Newcastle upon Tyne.
Messenger	(United Kingdom of Great Britain and Ireland) Turks Islands	The sloop was driven out to sea from the Turks Islands in a hurricane. No further trace.
Neptunus	Hamburg	The ship was wrecked on Heligoland. Her crew were rescued. She was on a voyage from Newcastle upon Tyne to Hamburg.
Providentia	Russia	The ship foundered in the Dogger Bank. Her crew were rescued by Maria (flag unknown).
Santa Filomena	Malta	The spéronare sank between Comino and Cominotto with some loss of life. She was on a voyage from Licata, Sicily to Malta.
Susanna	Malta	The spéronare was wrecked near Comino with some loss of life. She was on a voyage from Malta to Agrigento, Sicily.
Thomas	United Kingdom	The ship ran aground and was wrecked in the Saint Lawrence River.
Warrens	United Kingdom	The ship struck a sunken rock off Cape Tormentine, Nova Scotia, British North America. She was on a voyage from Pugwash, Nova Scotia to London. She put back to Pugwash, where she was condemned.

== 15 October ==
List of shipwrecks: 15 October 1846
Ship	State	Description
Adelaide	France	The ship was driven ashore and wrecked at Great Yarmouth, Norfolk, United Kingdom. Her crew were rescued by the lugger Fame (United Kingdom.
Clarendon	United Kingdom	The ship ran aground on the Acorlay Reef, north of Antigua. She was on a voyage from Liverpool, Lancashire to British Honduras. She was refloated and resumed her voyage.
Friede	Prussia	The ship was abandoned in the Baltic Sea. Her crew were rescued by Effort (United Kingdom). Friede was on a voyage from Wollin to Königsberg.
Lady Protheroe	United Kingdom	The ship was driven ashore and wrecked at Dungeness, Kent. Her crew were rescued.
Lady Ruthven	United Kingdom	The ship was driven ashore and wrecked at Dungeness. Her crew were rescued. She was on a voyage from South Shields, County Durham to Havre de Grâce, Seine-Inférieure, France.

== 16 October ==
List of shipwrecks: 16 October 1846
Ship	State	Description
Fortuna	United Kingdom	The ship ran aground off Læsø, Denmark. She was on a voyage from Riga, Russia to Sunderland, County Durham.
Levi H. Gale	Flag unknown	The ship was wrecked at Capo Ferro, Kingdom of Sardinia. Her crew were rescued. She was on a voyage from Genoa, Kingdom of Sardinia to Málaga, Spain.
Medora	United Kingdom	The ship ran aground at South Shields, County Durham. She was on a voyage from Quebec City, Province of Canada, British North America to South Shields.
Progress	United Kingdom	The ship was driven ashore north of Libava, Courland Governorate. She was on a voyage from Dundee, Forfarshire to Riga, Russia.
Rose	United Kingdom	The ship was abandoned in the Atlantic Ocean. Her crew were rescued by Audelle (France). Rose was on a voyage from Saint John, New Brunswick, British North America to Sligo.

== 17 October ==
List of shipwrecks: 17 October 1846
Ship	State	Description
Odessa	United Kingdom	The ship was driven ashore at Sandy Hook, New Jersey, United States. She was on a voyage from Windsor, Nova Scotia to New York. She was refloated on 19 October and taken in to New York.
Samuel	Trieste	The ship departed from Falmouth, Cornwall, United Kingdom for Limerick, United Kingdom. No further trace, presumed foundered with the loss of all hands.

== 18 October ==
List of shipwrecks: 18 October 1846
Ship	State	Description
Ambassador	United Kingdom	The barque was driven ashore and severely damaged on Seal Island, Nova Scotia, British North America. She was on a voyage from Saint John, New Brunswick, British North America to Bridgwater, Somerset. She was refloated on 22 October and taken in to Yarmouth, Nova Scotia for repairs.
George Canning	United Kingdom	The ship was wrecked near Pará, Brazil. She was on a voyage from Liverpool, Lancashire to Maranhão, Brazil.
Oliver and Eliza	United States	The ship was wrecked near Key West, Florida. Her crew were rescued. She was on a voyage from New Orleans, Louisiana to Bordeaux, Gironde, France.
Oscar	Sweden	The ship was driven ashore on Dragør, Denmark. Her crew were rescued. She was on a voyage from Landskrona to Kalmar.
Wandering Spirit	United Kingdom	The schooner yacht was driven ashore at Kinsale, County Cork.

== 19 October ==
List of shipwrecks: 19 October 1846
Ship	State	Description
Annandale	United Kingdom	The ship was abandoned at sea with the loss of a crew member. Survivors were rescued by Viola (United Kingdom).
Chevrette	French Navy	The Tactique-class brig collided with Prevolant (French Navy) and sank in the North Sea off Dunbar, Lothian, United Kingdom with the loss of four of her crew.
Flora	United Kingdom	The schooner ran aground on the Gunfleet Sand, in the North Sea off the coast of Essex. She was on a voyage from London to Glasgow, Renfrewshire. She was refloated and resumed her voyage.
Griffiths	United Kingdom	The ship was lost off Valencia Island, County Kerry with the loss of all hands. She was on a voyage from Kilrush, County Clare to London.
Joseph	United Kingdom	The sloop was driven ashore and wrecked on Inishmore, Aran Islands with the loss of three of her crew.
Minerva	United Kingdom	The ship was driven ashore at Seaton Sluice, County Durham. She was refloated.
Ocean	United Kingdom	The ship was abandoned in the Atlantic Ocean. Her crew were rescued by Ruby (United Kingdom).
Maria Spear; Roman	United States	The ships collided and sank in the Atlantic Ocean. Their crews were rescued by Albion (Bremen). Maria Spear was on a voyage from New York to Londonderry, United Kingdom. Roman was on a voyage from Newburyport, Massachusetts to New York.
Wilhelmine	Denmark	The ship ran aground off "Hjalebeck", Denmark. She was on a voyage from Trieste to Saint Petersburg, Russia. She was refloated.
William	United Kingdom	The brig foundered off Valentia Island, County Kerry with the loss of all hands. She was on a voyage from Kilrush, County Clare to London.
Windelina	Russia	The ship was driven ashore on Bornholm, Denmark. Her crew were rescued.

== 20 October ==
List of shipwrecks: 20 October 1846
Ship	State	Description
Arrabon	United States	The ship was wrecked on the Reef Head, India. Her crew were rescued.
Betsy	United Kingdom	The ship ran aground on the Broadstead Knowl. She was on a voyage from Blyth, Northumberland to Portsmouth, Hampshire. She was refloated.
Brave	United Kingdom	The ship foundered in the Atlantic Ocean with the loss of all but one of her crew. She was on a voyage from Prince Edward Island, British North America to Sunderland, County Durham.
Defender	United Kingdom	The ship was driven ashore at Redcar, Yorkshire. She was refloated and taken in to Hartlepool, County Durham in a leaky condition.
Deptford	United Kingdom	The ship was abandoned in the Atlantic Ocean with the loss of three of her nine crew. Survivors were rescued by Scotsman (United Kingdom).
Isabella	United Kingdom	The ship was driven ashore and sank at Bideford, Devon. She was on a voyage from Bridgwater, Somerset to an Irish port.
Mary	United Kingdom	The sloop was driven ashore at Great Yarmouth, Norfolk. She was on a voyage from London to Lowestoft, Suffolk. She was refloated the next day.
Mary Ann	United Kingdom	The barque was abandoned in the Atlantic Ocean. Her crew were rescued by Oriental (United Kingdom). Mary Ann was on a voyage from Quebec City, Province of Canada, British North America to Troon, Ayrshire. She was subsequently driven ashore and wrecked at Rosemergy, Cornwall. The shattered hull was towed in to Hayle, Cornwall on 27 October.
Recovery	United Kingdom	The ship was wrecked on North Cape, Prince Edward Island, British North America. She was on a voyage from Liverpool, Lancashire to Miramichi, New Brunswick.
Treasurer	United Kingdom	The ship ran aground near Matanzas, Cuba. She was on a voyage from London to Matanzas. She was refloated and taken in to Matanzas.

== 21 October ==
List of shipwrecks: 21 October 1846
Ship	State	Description
Alert	United Kingdom	The ship was driven ashore and wrecked at Fishguard, Pembrokeshire with the loss of all but one of her crew.
Ann and Letitia	United Kingdom	The ship was driven ashore and severely damaged at Fishguard.
Athalia	United Kingdom	The ship was driven ashore and wrecked at Fishguard. Her crew were rescued. She was on a voyage from Caernarfon to Bristol, Gloucestershire.
Brothers	United Kingdom	The ship was driven ashore and severely damaged at Fishguard. She was on a voyage from Liverpool, Lancashire to Neath, Glamorgan.
Caçada	Portugal	The schooner was driven ashore between Torre and "Subanna", Brazil. She was on a voyage from Faial Island, Azores to Bahia, Brazil.
Catherine	United Kingdom	The ship was driven ashore and wrecked at Fishguard with the loss of all hands. She was on a voyage from Bangor to Southampton, Hampshire.
Catherine	United Kingdom	The ship was driven ashore in Waterloo Bay.
Celerity	United Kingdom	The ship was in collision with Lyons (United States) in The Downs and was abandoned. Her crew were rescued by Lyons. Celerity was subsequently taken in to Ramsgate, Kent.
Charlotte	United Kingdom	The ship was driven ashore and wrecked at Fishguard. Her crew were rescued.
Ebenezer	United Kingdom	The ship was driven ashore near Dunbar, Lothian.Her crew were rescued. She was on a voyage from Newport, Monmouthshire to Grangemouth, Stirlingshire.
Eliza	United Kingdom	The ship was driven ashore and wrecked at "Undercliffe Stowe", Cornwall. All on board were rescued. She was on a voyage from Liverpool to Valparaíso, Chile.
Eole	France	The chasse-marée was driven ashore and wrecked at Ramsgate with the loss of three of her five crew. She was on a voyage from Boulogne, Pas-de-Calais to Havre de Grâce, Seine-Inférieure.
Erin	United Kingdom	The ship was driven ashore and wrecked at Fishguard. Her crew were rescued.
Glory	United Kingdom	The ship ran aground and sank at the Mumbles, Glamorgan. Her crew were rescued. She was on a voyage from Saundersfoot, Pembrokeshire to Great Yarmouth, Norfolk.
James	United Kingdom	The ship ran aground on the Goodwick Sands, Glamorgan and was severely damaged.
Jean	United Kingdom	The schooner was driven ashore at Ballyness, County Donegal with the loss of all hands.
John Alexander	United Kingdom	The ship was driven ashore and wrecked at Ballywalter, County Down. She was on a voyage from Killyleagh, County Down to Dublin.
John and Mary	United Kingdom	The ship was driven ashore and severely damaged at Fishguard.
Johns	United Kingdom	The ship was driven ashore and wrecked at Deal, Kent. She was on a voyage from Stockton-on-Tees, County Durham to Deal.
Juffer Stynte	Belgium	The ship departed from Algeciras, Spain whilst on a voyage from Marseille, Bouches-du-Rhône, France to Antwerp. No further trace, presumed foundered with the loss of all hands.
Lady Newborough	United Kingdom	The ship was driven ashore and wrecked at Fishguard. Her crew were rescued. She was on a voyage from Caernarfon to Bristol.
Lord Nelson	United Kingdom	The ship was driven ashore at Lowestoft, Suffolk. Her crew were rescued.
Margaret	United Kingdom	The ship was driven ashore and wrecked at Fishguard. Her crew were rescued. She was on a voyage from Barrow-in-Furness, Lancashire to Port Talbot, Glamorgan.
Martha	United Kingdom	The ship was driven ashore and wrecked at Fishguard with the loss of two of her crew.
Mary Ann	United Kingdom	The ship was driven ashore at Walmer Castle, Kent. She was on a voyage from Port Madoc, Caernarfonshire to Hull, Yorkshire. She was refloated on 24 October and taken in to Ramsgate.
Mary Ann	United Kingdom	The ship was driven ashore and wrecked at Fishguard. Her crew were rescued. She was on a voyage from Bangor to Port Talbot.
New Hope	United Kingdom	The ship was driven ashore and damaged at Fishguard. She was on a voyage from Liverpool to Ross-on-Wye, Herefordshire.
President	United Kingdom	The ship was driven ashore and severely damaged at Fishguard.
Sir Peregrine	United Kingdom	The ship was driven ashore and sank at Fishguard. Her crew were rescued by the Fishguard Lifeboat. She was on a voyage from Bangor to Cork.
Spartan	United Kingdom	The ship was driven ashore in the Bosphorus. HMS Bloodhound (Royal Navy) was sent to assist in refloating her.
Star	United Kingdom	The smack collided with a French vessel and sank off Deal.
HMS Swallow	Royal Navy	The ship was driven ashore at the mouth of the River Deel. Her crew were rescued. She was towed in to Limerick on 20 November by HMS Alban (Royal Navy).
Sylph	United Kingdom	The ship ran aground in the Sound of Eniska. She was on a voyage from Liverpool to Copenhagen, Denmark.
Theodor	Bremen	The ship was abandoned in the English Channel. Her crew were rescued by Otto (Bremen). Theodor was on a voyage from Riga, Russia to Cádiz, Spain. She came ashore west of Cherbourg, Seine-Inférieure, France on 26 October.
Thomas	United Kingdom	The ship was driven ashore and severely damaged at Fishguard.
Trusty	United Kingdom	The sloop was driven ashore at Bridlington, Yorkshire. She was on a voyage from Stockton-on-Tees to Boston, Lincolnshire. She was refloated the next day and taken in to Bridlington.
Union	United Kingdom	The ship was driven ashore and wrecked at Fishguard. Her crew were rescued.
Vespasian	Belgium	The ship was driven ashore at the Rammekins Castle, Zeeland Netherlands. She was on a voyage from Antwerp to Cardiff, Glamorgan. She was refloated on 24 October and taken in to Vlissingen, Zeeland.

== 22 October ==
List of shipwrecks: 22 October 1846
Ship	State	Description
Amulet	United Kingdom	The ship was driven ashore at Garrison Point, Kent.
Belgrave	United Kingdom	The ship was driven ashore and wrecked in Penrhyn Bay with the loss of five of her seven crew. She was on a voyage from Workington, Cumberland to Dublin.
British Queen	United Kingdom	The schooner was driven ashore in Sheephaven Bay. Her six crew were rescued. She was on a voyage from Liverpool, Lancashire to Westport, County Mayo. She was refloated and taken in to Dunfanaghy, County Donegal.
Bon Pasteur	France	The ship was driven ashore on Martinique.
Buctouche	United Kingdom	The barque struck rocks at St. Davids Head, Pembrokeshire and capsized with the loss of all hands. She was driven ashore at Aberpool.
Catharina	United Kingdom	The ship was abandoned in the North Sea. Her crew were rescued by Sietzeman (Netherlands). She was on a voyage from Hartlepool, County Durham to Neufeld, Duchy of Schleswig.
Charlotte	United Kingdom	The brig was driven ashore at "Poolgwaelod", Monmouthshire. She was on a voyage from Newport, Monmouthshire to Glasgow, Renfrewshire. Charlotte was repaired, refloated and taken in to Newport, where she arrived on 7 November.
Comus	(United Kingdom of Great Britain and Ireland) Jersey	The ship ran aground and was wrecked at Aberdyfi, Merionethshire. She was on a voyage from Waterford to Bristol, Gloucestershire.
Curlew	United Kingdom	The ship was driven ashore on Rathlin Island, County Antrim. Her crew were rescued. She was on a voyage from Arkhangelsk, Russia to Gloucester.
Elizabeth	United Kingdom	The brig was driven ashore at Morfa Bychan, Caernarfonshire. Her crew were rescued. She was on a voyage from Liverpool to Tralee, County Kerry.
Eliza Moore	United Kingdom	The ship was driven ashore on Coll, Inner Hebrides. Her crew were rescued. She was on a voyage from Riga, Russia to Belfast, County Antrim.
Foxdale	(United Kingdom of Great Britain and Ireland) Isle of Man	The schooner was driven ashore at Morfa Bychan. She was on a voyage from Liverpool to Swansea, Glamorgan. She was refloated on 1 November and taken in to Port Madoc, Caernarfonshire.
Glen Helen	United Kingdom	The ship was driven ashore and wrecked at Northam, Devon. All 33 people on board were rescued by the Northam Lifeboat. She was on a voyage from Liverpool to New Orleans, Louisiana, United States.
Jane	United Kingdom	The schooner capsized and was driven ashore at Dunfanaghy, County Donegal with the loss of all hands.
John Alexander	United Kingdom	The ship was driven ashore and wrecked at Ballywalter, County Antrim. She was on a voyage from Belfast, County Antrim to Dublin.
John	United Kingdom	The brig was driven ashore at "Puchgoman", Anglesey. Her crew were rescued. She was on a voyage from Whitehaven, Cumberland to Dublin. She was refloated on 4 November and taken in to Holyhead, Anglesey.
Magog	United Kingdom	The ship was run into by John (United Kingdom) and was driven ashore at Holyhead. She was refloated and taken in to Holyhead.
Minerva	United Kingdom	The ship was driven ashore at "Dawling". She was on a voyage from Riga to Belfast. She was refloated on 8 November and taken in to Ards, County Down.
Prince Albert	United Kingdom	The ship was driven ashore at Cardigan. Her crew were rescued. She was on a voyage from Liverpool to Rotterdam, South Holland, Netherlands. She was refloated on 24 October and taken in to Cardigan.
Reform	United Kingdom	The ship was driven ashore at Fraserburgh, Aberdeenshire. She was refloated.
Samaritan	United Kingdom	The brig was driven ashore at St. Eval's Head, Cornwall with the loss of eight of her eleven crew. She was on a voyage from Liverpool to Constantinople, Ottoman Empire.
Tug	United Kingdom	The ship struck the pier and sank at Maryport, Cumberland. She was on a voyage from Belfast, County Antrim to Liverpool. She was refloated on 26 October.
Union	United Kingdom	The schooner was driven ashore at Poolgwaelod. She was on a voyage from Newport to Glasgow. Union was later refloated and beached. She was refloated on 7 November and beached. Union was taken in to Newport on 19 November.

== 23 October ==
List of shipwrecks: 23 October 1846
Ship	State	Description
Argonaut	United Kingdom	The ship was driven ashore at Plymouth, Devon. She was on a voyage from Saint Domingo to Plymouth.
Britain	(United Kingdom of Great Britain and Ireland) British North America	The barque ran aground on a rock off Ragged Islands, Newfoundland. She was on a voyage from Dominica to Yarmouth, Nova Scotia. She was refloated and taken in to Liverpool, Nova Scotia.
Colombian	United Kingdom	The ship was driven ashore and wrecked on St, John's Point, County Donegal. She was on a voyage from Liverpool, Lancashire to Philadelphia, Pennsylvania, United States. She was refloated on 30 October and beached at Killybegs, County Donegal.
Dochfour	United Kingdom	The ship was wrecked on Cape Bon Ann, Maine, United States. Her crew were rescued. She was on a voyage from Bristol, Gloucestershire to Quebec City, Province of Canada, British North America.
Elizabeth	United Kingdom	The ship was driven ashore and wrecked at Towyn, Merionethshire with the loss of a crew member. She was on a voyage from Liverpool to Kingston, Jamaica.
Ellen	United Kingdom	The schooner was driven ashore at Fleshwick Isle of Man with the loss of a crew member. She was on a voyage from Troon, Ayrshire to Belfast, County Antrim.
General Sale	United Kingdom	The ship ran aground on the Battery Reef, off Plymouth. She was refloated on 26 October and taken in to Plymouth.
Glen Henry or Glen Helen	United Kingdom	The ship was dismasted in the Bristol Channel 30 nautical miles (56 km) west of Lundy Island, Devon. She came ashore at Bideford, Devon and was wrecked. Her crew were rescued. She was on a voyage from Liverpool to New Orleans, Louisiana, United States.
Indus	United Kingdom	The ship was driven ashore at Cape George, Nova Scotia. She was on a voyage from Pictou, Nova Scotia to Boston, Massachusetts, United States.
Manilla	(United Kingdom of Great Britain and Ireland) British North America	The ship was driven ashore and wrecked at Métis-sur-Mer, Province of Canada.
Marchioness of Bute, or Marquis of Bute	United Kingdom	The barque was driven ashore and wrecked at Équihen, Pas-de-Calais, France. Her crew were rescued by a lifeboat. She was on a voyage from the Ionian Islands to London. She was refloated on 2 November and taken in to Boulogne, Pas-de-Calais.
Mary Jones	United Kingdom	The schooner was driven ashore at the mouth of the River Dovey.
McLean	United Kingdom	The tug struck the pier and sank at Maryport, Cumberland. She was on a voyage from Belfast, County Antrim to Maryport. She was refloated on 26 October.
Ocean	United Kingdom	The brig was driven ashore and wrecked at Métis-sur-Mer with the loss of eleven of her crew.
Spartan	United Kingdom	The ship was driven ashore and wrecked at Bideford. She was on a voyage from Cardiff, Glamorgan to Livorno, Grand Duchy of Tuscany.
Three Sisters	United Kingdom	The ship ran aground and sank at Aberystwyth, Cardiganshire. She was on a voyage from Pentewan, Cornwall to Liverpool. She was refloated on 2 November and taken in to Aberystyth.
Venus	Flag unknown	The ship ran aground off "Affel", Norway. She was refloated and resumed her voyage.
Victoria	United Kingdom	The ship was driven ashore and wrecked at Holyhead, Anglesey. She was on a voyage from Liverpool to the Clyde. She was refloated on 1 November and taken in to Holyhead.
Victory	United Kingdom	The ship was driven ashore at Holyhead. Her crew were rescued. She was on a voyage from Limerick to Glasgow, Renfrewshire.

== 24 October ==
List of shipwrecks: 24 October 1846
Ship	State	Description
Christians Haab	Duchy of Holstein	The ship was driven ashore at Burnham Overy Staithe, Norfolk, United Kingdom. She was on a voyage from Flensburg to Burnham Overy Staithe.
Cupid	United Kingdom	The ship was driven ashore and wrecked at Lowestoft, Suffolk. Her crew were rescued.
Dochfour	United Kingdom	The barque was wrecked at Cape Bonhomme, Province of Canada, British North America. Her crew were rescued. She was on a voyage from Bristol, Gloucestershire to Quebec City, Province of Canada.
Gourlands	United Kingdom	The ship sank at Swansea, Glamorgan. She was on a voyage from Llanelly, Glamorgan to London.
Hebe	United Kingdom	The ship was lost near Kerry Head, County Kerry with the loss of all but two of her crew. She was on a voyage from London to Limerick.
Jeune Celine	France	The ship was wrecked on the Maguano Reef. She was on a voyage from Port-au-Prince, Haiti to Havre de Grâce, Seine-Inférieure.
John and Thomas	United Kingdom	The ship was abandoned off Hammerfest, Norway. Her crew were rescued. She was on a voyage from Arkhangelsk, Russia to Cork.
John Daniel	United Kingdom	The ship was driven ashore on Sully Island, Glamorgan. Her crew were rescued.
Lady Ann Murray	United Kingdom	The sloop was lost at Portpatrick, Wigtownshire.
London	United Kingdom	The paddle tug was driven ashore in the River Thames at Coalhouse Point, Essex. She was on a voyage from London to Hull, Yorkshire.
Margaret Thompson	United Kingdom	The ship was abandoned in the Atlantic Ocean. Her crew were rescued. She was on a voyage from Donegal to Miramichi, New Brunswick, British North America.
Messenger	United Kingdom	The ship was driven ashore and wrecked at Aberavon, Cardiganshire. Her crew were rescued. She was on a voyage from Liverpool, Lancashire to New Orleans, Louisiana, British North America.
Miranda	United Kingdom	The schooner was lost near the Corsewall Lighthouse, Wigtownshire with the loss of a crew member.
Nyverheid	Netherlands	The ship ran aground off Ameland, Friesland. She was on a voyage from Königsburg, Prussia to Rotterdam, South Holland.
Olivia	United Kingdom	The ship ran aground and sank at Rye, Sussex. She was on a voyage from Seaham, County Durham to Rye.
Peri	United Kingdom	The ship was driven ashore at Dungeness, Kent. She was on a voyage from London to São Miguel Island, Azores. She was refloated and taken in to Dover, Kent.
Sisters	United Kingdom	The ship ran aground at Great Yarmouth, Norfolk. She was on a voyage from Hartlepool, County Durham to London. She was refloated on 26 October.
Sultana	(United Kingdom of Great Britain and Ireland) British North America	The ship was wrecked in the Fox River, Nova Scotia. Her crew were rescued. She was on a voyage from Cuba to Quebec City.
Tamerlane	United Kingdom	The ship was driven ashore and wrecked near Aberystwyth, Cardiganshire. Her crew were rescued. She was on a voyage from Liverpool, Lancashire to New Orleans, Louisiana, United States. She was refloated on 2 November and taken in to Aberystwyth.
Zoe	Flag unknown	The ship ran aground off Ystad, Sweden. She was on a voyage from Libava, Courland Governorate to Morlaix, Finistère. She was refloated and taken in to Ystad for repairs

== 25 October ==
List of shipwrecks: October 1846
Ship	State	Description
Ariel	United Kingdom	The ship ran aground on the Gunfleet Sand, in the North Sea off the coast of Essex. She was on a voyage from Saint Petersburg, Russia to London. She was refloated on 29 October and taken in to Harwich, Essex.
Ariel	United Kingdom	The ship ran aground on the Anholt Reef, in the Baltic Sea. She was on a voyage from Stettin to London. She was refloated but consequently sank. Her crew were rescued.
Earl of March	United Kingdom	The ship sprang a leak and was beached at South Shields, County Durham. She was on a voyage from South Shields to Cromarty. She was refloated and towed in to South Shields.
Franke	Netherlands	The ship was wrecked on Hogland, Russia. She was on a voyage from Saint Petersburg to Groningen.
Isabella	United Kingdom	The ship was driven ashore and sank at Bideford, Devon. Her crew were rescued. She was on a voyage from Bridgwater, Somerset to an Irish port.
Jonge Antoine	Belgium	The ship was driven ashore on Eierland, North Holland, Netherlands. Her crew were rescued. She was on a voyage from Saint Petersburg to Antwerp.
Joseph	United Kingdom	The ship was driven ashore at Dungeness, Kent. She was on a voyage from Colchester, Essex to Nantes, Loire-Inférieure, France.
Kelvin Grove	United Kingdom	The ship was wrecked on the Crusader Bank, in the Irish Sea off the coast of Lancashire. Her crew were rescued. She was on a voyage from Belfast, County Antrim to Fleetwood, Lancashire. She was refloated on 20 November. It was intended to take her in to Preston, Lancashire but she was driven ashore and wrecked.
Maria Catharina	United Kingdom	The ship was driven ashore on Eierland. Her crew were rescued. She was on a voyage from Saint Petersburg to Antwerp.
Mary Ann	United Kingdom	The ship was driven ashore at the Mumbles, Glamorgan. She was on a voyage from Porthcawl, Glamorgan to Dublin. She was refloated the next day.

== 26 October ==
List of shipwrecks: 26 October 1846
Ship	State	Description
Brian Beru	United Kingdom	The ship ran aground at Soldier's Point, County Louth.
Brothers	(United Kingdom of Great Britain and Ireland) British North America	The ship struck a rock off Prospect, Nova Scotia and sank with the loss of nine of her crew. She was on a voyage from Boston, Massachusetts, United States to Pictou, Nova Scotia.
Brunswick	(United Kingdom of Great Britain and Ireland) British North America	The ship was abandoned in the Atlantic Ocean. Her crew were rescued by Henry (United Kingdom). Brunswick was on a voyage from Londonderry to Saint Andrews, New Brunswick.
Cadmus	United Kingdom	The ship struck a sunken rock in the Minch and was damaged. She was on a voyage from Arkhangelsk, Russia to Gloucester. She put in to East Loch Tarbert in a severely leaky condition.
Carnatic	United Kingdom	The ship was wrecked off Middleton Point, India.
Cornelia	Prussia	The ship ran aground on the Woolpack Sand, in the North Sea and was damaged. She put in to Wells-next-the-Sea, Norfolk, United Kingdom.
Florida	United Kingdom	The ship was driven ashore on St. Martin's, Isles of Scilly. She was on a voyage from Quebec City, Province of Canada, British North America to Cardigan. She was refloated.
Gem	United Kingdom	The ship ran aground on the Hook Sand, in the English Channel off the coast of Dorset. She was on a voyage from London to Bridgwater, Somerset. She was refloated and taken in to Studland Bay.
Jessie Anderson	United Kingdom	The ship was abandoned on the Nickman Grounds, in the Baltic Sea off the coast of Denmark. Her crew were rescued by Satisfaction (United Kingdom). She was on a voyage from Saint Petersburg, Russia to Leith, Lothian.
Jong Antoine	Belgium	The ship was driven ashore on Eierland, North Holland, Netherlands. She was on a voyage from Saint Petersburg, Russia to Antwerp.
Margaret McKenzie	United Kingdom	The ship was abandoned in the North Sea. Her crew were rescued by Telegraph (Netherlands). Margaret McKenzie was on a voyage from Thurso, Caithness to a Welsh port.
Maria Catharina	Belgium	The ship was driven ashore on Eierland. Her crew were rescued. She was on a voyage from Saint Petersburg to Antwerp.
Mermaid	United Kingdom	The ship was driven ashore and wrecked at "Port Egbert". She was on a voyage from the West Indies to Liverpool, Nova Scotia, British North America.
Princess Royal	United Kingdom	The paddle tug was driven ashore at "Holyhaven", Essex. She was on a voyage from Hamburg to London. She was refloated on 4 November and completed her voyage.
Reward	United Kingdom	The ship struck a sunken rock and sank south of the Isle of Arran. Her crew were rescued. She was on a voyage from Galway to Bristol, Gloucestershire.
Robert and George	United Kingdom	The ship ran aground at South Shields, County Durham. She was on a voyage from Quebec City to South Shields. She was refloated and taken in to South Shields in a leaky condition.
Spartan	United Kingdom	The ship was driven ashore at Copenhagen, Denmark. Her crew were rescued.
Terrier	United Kingdom	The ship was wrecked on the Jardanilloes, off the coast of Cuba. She was on a voyage from Cienfuegos, Cuba to London.
Twee Gebroeders	Netherlands	The ship was in collision with a brig and sank in the North Sea off the Galloper Sandbank. Her crew were rescued.
Zoar	United Kingdom	The sloop struck the stump of the old Shears Beacon and was wrecked in the Swin, off the coast of Essex. Her crew were rescued. She was on a voyage from Leeds, Yorkshire to London.

== 27 October ==
List of shipwrecks: 27 October 1846
Ship	State	Description
Alexandria	Sweden	The schooner ran aground near "Wieland", Friesland, Netherlands. She was on a voyage from Gothenburg to Le Tréport, Seine-Inférieure, France. She was refloated and taken in to Harlingen, Friesland in a leaky condition.
Corncordia	Duchy of Holstein	The ship was driven ashore on the east end of Terschelling, Friesland with the loss of a crew member. She was on a voyage from Flensburg to Antwerp, Belgium.
Delphos	United States	The whaler was wrecked at Palmerston Island, Cook Islands, with the loss of two of her crew. Another report has her wrecking on a reef 4 nautical miles (7.4 km) off Palmerston Island with the loss of six of her crew. Alert (United States),
Elizabeth	United Kingdom	The ship was wrecked in the Farne Islands, Northumberland. She was on a voyage from Blyth, Northumberland to Leith, Lothian.
Jeune Emelie	France	The ship was driven ashore at Margate, Kent, United Kingdom. She was on a voyage from Calais to London.
Macedonia	Spain	The ship ran aground and was damaged on Perkin's Ledge. She was refloated and taken in to Bath, Maine, United States.
Margaret	United Kingdom	The schooner was wrecked in Algoa Bay.
Mona	(United Kingdom of Great Britain and Ireland) New South Wales	The barque was driven ashore and wrecked in Algoa Bay. All on board were rescued.
New Pink	United Kingdom	The ship ran aground on the Topocalina Shoals, in the Pacific Ocean off the coast of Chile. She was refloated but consequently sank. Her crew were rescued. New Pink was on a voyage from London to Valparaíso, Chile.
Palestine	United Kingdom	The brig was driven ashore and wrecked in Algoa Bay. Her crew were rescued.
Resolution	United Kingdom	The barque was wrecked in Algoa Bay.
Sophia	United Kingdom	The schooner was wrecked in Algoa Bay.
Susannah	United Kingdom	The ship departed from Genoa, Kingdom of Sardinia for Cork. No further trace, presumed foundered with the loss of all hands.

== 28 October ==
List of shipwrecks: 28 October 1846
Ship	State	Description
Bortha	Stralsund	The ship ran aground on a reef north east of Skagen, Denmark. She was on a voyage from Newcastle upon Tyne, Northumberland, United Kingdom to Stralsund. She was refloated the next day and resumed her voyage
Neptune	(United Kingdom of Great Britain and Ireland) British North America	The ship was wrecked in St. Peter's Bay, Prince Edward Island with the loss of five lives. she was on a voyage from Miramichi, New Brunswick to Saint John's, Newfoundland.
Orelia	United Kingdom	The ship ran aground on the Lemon and Ower Sand, in the English Channel off the coast of Sussex. She was on a voyage from Danzig to Guernsey, Channel Islands. She was refloated and taken in to Yarmouth, Isle of Wight.
Stephani	Hamburg	The ship depareted from Hamburg for New York, United States. No further trace, presumed foundered with the loss of her crew and all 280 passengers.

== 29 October ==
List of shipwrecks: 29 October 1846
Ship	State	Description
Collina	Netherlands	The ship was driven ashore on Engelman's Plaat, off the coast of Groningen province. She was on a voyage from Königsberg, Prussia to the city of Groningen.
Entaw	United States	The ship ran aground on the Pampas, off the coast of Zeeland, Netherlands.
Hero	United Kingdom	The barque collided with Foig-a-Ballagh (United Kingdom and foundered off St. Paul's, Nova Scotia, British North America.
Jeune Emilie	France	The ship was driven ashore at Margate, Kent, United Kingdom. She was on a voyage from Calais to London, United Kingdom.
Margaret	United Kingdom	The schooner was driven ashore and wrecked in Algoa Bay. Her crew were rescued.
Minerva	Norway	The ship ran aground off the coast of Friesland, Netherlands. She was on a voyage from Dram to Amsterdam, South Holland, Netherlands. She was refloated and taken in to Terschelling, Friesland in a wrecked condition.
Nancy	United Kingdom	The brig was wrecked at South Shotts, Newfoundland, British North America with the loss of two of her crew.
Pioneer	United Kingdom	The ship departed from Viana do Castelo, Portugal for London. No further trace, presumed foundered with the loss of all hands.
Resolution	United Kingdom	The barque was wrecked in Algoa Bay. Her crew were rescued.
Siren	United Kingdom	The ship departed from Gibraltar for Cork. No further trace, presumed foundered with the loss of all hands.
Sophia	United Kingdom	The schooner was wrecked in Algoa Bay. Her crew were rescued.
Trace Martha	Denmark	The ship ran aground on the Nore. She was on a voyage from Copenhagen to London. She was refloated on 2 November and resumed her voyage in a leaky condition.
Triton	United Kingdom	The ship ran aground off Lady Isle. She was on a voyage from Troon, Ayrshire to Belfast, County Antrim. She was refloated on 30 October.
Union Grove	United Kingdom	The ship ran aground on the Swine Bottoms. She was on a voyage from Aberdeen to a Baltic port. She was refloated and taken in to Helsingør, Denmark for repairs.
Unkena	Netherlands	The ship was driven ashore on the north coast of Terschelling. She was on a voyage from Königsberg, Prussia to Rotterdam, South Holland. She was declared a total loss.
Vrow Meeltje	United Kingdom	The ship was driven ashore and wrecked on Engeleman's Plaat. Her crew were rescued. She was on a voyage from Memel, Prussia to Rotterdam.

== 30 October ==
List of shipwrecks: 30 October 1846
Ship	State	Description
Catharine	United Kingdom	The ship was driven ashore in "Waterloo Bay". Her crew were rescued.
Concord	France	The ship ran aground off "Wiken". She was refloated and towed in to Helsingør, Denmark for repairs.
Indiana	United States	The ship ran aground near Crosby, Lancashire, United Kingdom. She was on a voyage from New Orleans, Louisiana to Liverpool, Lancashire. She was refloated and taken in to Liverpool.
Neptunus	Prussia	The ship was driven ashore near Helsingør, Denmark. She was on a voyage from Memel to King's Lynn, Norfolk, United Kingdom. She was refloated on 1 November and resumed her voyage.
Prosperity	United Kingdom	The schooner was driven ashore and wrecked at "Wilmot", Nova Scotia, British North America. Her crew were rescued.
San Mario	Malta	The ship foundered in the Mediterranean Sea east of Malta. Her crew were rescued. She was on a voyage from a Black Sea port to Malta.

== 31 October ==
List of shipwrecks: 31 October 1846
Ship	State	Description
Concord	France	The ship was driven ashore near Höganäs, Sweden. She was on a voyage from Riga, Russia to Saint-Malo, Ille-et-Vilaine.
Eliza	Danzig	The ship ran aground on the Skagen Reef. She was on a voyage from Liverpool, Lancashire, United Kingdom to Danzig. She was refloated and resumed her voyage.
Frau Gesina	Prussia	The ship was wrecked on the Thistle Reef, off Gothenburg, sweden. Her crew were rescued. She was on a voyage from Königsberg to Leith, Lothian, United Kingdom.
Hedvig	Prussia	The barque ran aground in the Droogden. She was on a voyage from Pillau to London, United Kingdom. She was refloated the next day and resumed her voyage.
Herbert	United Kingdom	The schooner was wrecked on São Miguel Island, Azores. Her crew were rescued.
Neptunus	Prussia	The brig was driven ashore at Helsingør, Denmark.
Preussischer Adler	Prussia	The ship was driven ashore in Kimmeridge Bay. She was on a voyage from Cork to London. She was refloated and resumed her voyage.

== Unknown date ==
List of shipwrecks: Unknown date in October 1846
Ship	State	Description
Amy Robsart	United Kingdom	The ship departed from Bristol, Gloucestershire for Hong Kong. No further trace, presumed foundered with the loss of all hands.
Ann	(United Kingdom of Great Britain and Ireland) British North America	The brig was abandoned in the Atlantic Ocean before 9 October.
Ann Jeffery	United Kingdom	The ship was abandoned in the Atlantic Ocean before 10 October. Her crew were rescued. She was on a voyage from Quebec City, Province of Canada, British North America to Liverpool, Lancashire.
Ant	United Kingdom	The ship was abandoned in the Grand Banks of Newfoundland before 4 October. Her crew were rescued by Pomona (United Kingdom).
Benjamin Franklin	United States	The brig was abandoned in the Atlantic Ocean before 10 October.
Briton	United Kingdom	The ship was driven ashore and wrecked in St Brides Bay. Her crew were rescued. She was on a voyage from Barra, Outer Hebrides to Cardiff, Glamorgan.
Burley	United Kingdom	The barque was driven ashore at Cienfuegos, Cuba before 14 October.
City of Limerick	United Kingdom	The ship was driven ashore and wrecked between Lough Swilly and "Mulroy", County Donegal with the loss of a crew member. She was on a voyage from Limerick to the Clyde.
Chase	United Kingdom	The ship struck a sunken rock off the coast of Lapland, Norway between 9 and 21 October. She was on a voyage from Arkhangelsk, Russia to Dundee, Forfarshire. She consequently put back to Arkhangelsk.
Claremont	United Kingdom	The ship was wrecked on the Russian coast. She was on a voyage from Taganrog, Russia to Cork.
Colonel Harvey	United States	Mexican–American War: The steamship was wrecked at the mouth of the Rio Grande with the loss of fifteen lives.
Cornwallis	United Kingdom	The ship was abandoned in the Atlantic Ocean after 19 October. Her crew were rescued by Indus (United Kingdom).
Cushla-ma-Cree	United Kingdom	The brig was abandoned in the Atlantic Ocean before 3 October. Her crew were rescued by Flora (United Kingdom). Cushla-ma-Cree was on a voyage from Quebec City to Liverpool.
Eleanor	United Kingdom	The ship foundered in the North Sea off the coast of County Durham before 25 October.
Elizabeth Bibby	(United Kingdom of Great Britain and Ireland) British North America	The ship was abandoned in the Atlantic Ocean before 21 October.
Emulous	United Kingdom	The ship foundered in the Atlantic Ocean off the coast of County Sligo before 25 October. The ship's dog survived.
Eusophyne	(United Kingdom of Great Britain and Ireland) British North America	The ship was abandoned in the Atlantic Ocean before 7 October.
Foam	United Kingdom	The ship was wrecked off Mozambique before 23 October.
Fortitude	United Kingdom	The ship was abandoned in the Atlantic Ocean before 20 October.
Fortitude	United Kingdom	The ship was driven ashore and wrecked on Læsø, Denmark between 24 and 31 October. She was on a voyage from Riga, Russia to Bridgwater, Somerset.
Frederica	Flag unknown	The ship foundered in the English Channel off the coast of Dorset before 8 October.
Friendship	United Kingdom	The ship was driven ashore at Abersoch, Caernarfonshire. She was refloated on 18 October and taken in to Pwllheli.
Havre et Martinique	France	The ship was driven ashore near Wilmington, Delaware, United States. She was later refloated and taken in to New York.
Herald	(United Kingdom of Great Britain and Ireland) British North America	The ship was abandoned in the Atlantic Ocean before 20 October.
Heroine	United States	The whaler was wrecked on Palmerston Island at night with the loss of one life. Alert (flag unknown) rescued the survivors in December 1846 and carried them to the Bay of Islands, New Zealand.
Irene	Stettin	The ship foundered in the North Sea. Her crew were rescued.
Isaac	(United Kingdom of Great Britain and Ireland) Cape Colony	The sloop was lost in the Breede River before 23 October.
Isabella and Ann	United Kingdom	The ship was wrecked near Portrush, County Antrim.
John Daniel	United Kingdom	The ship was driven ashore at Sully, Glamorgan. She was refloated on 28 October and taken in to Penarth, Glamorgan.
Joseph W. Pim	United Kingdom	The ship was driven ashore and damage at "Portgarven", Cornwall. She was refloated on 31 October and taken in to Padstow.
Larkins	United Kingdom	The ship was abandoned in the Atlantic Ocean before 16 October.
Lord John Russell	United Kingdom	The ship was abandoned in the Atlantic Ocean before 7 October. Her crew were rescued by Elizabeth (United Kingdom). Lord John Russell was on a voyage from London to Quebec City.
Louisa	United Kingdom	The ship was abandoned in the Atlantic Ocean before 13 October.
Magnet	United Kingdom	The ship was driven ashore on Anticosti Island, Province of Quebec before 24 October. She was on a voyage from Liverpool to Montreal and Quebec City.
Martha	United Kingdom	The barque foundered in the Grand Banks of Newfoundland before 5 October. Her crew were rescued by Industry (United Kingdom).
Martha	(France) Mauritius	The ship was abandoned off Zanzibar before 19 October.
Mary C. Fitzroy	United Kingdom	The ship was abandoned in the North Sea before 16 October. She was taken in to Korshavn, Norway in a derelict condition on 16 November.
Mithridese	France	The ship was driven ashore on the coast of Puerto Rico.
Neptune	United Kingdom	The barque was abandoned in the Atlantic Ocean before 12 October.
Nile	United Kingdom	The ship was abandoned in the Atlantic Ocean before 9 October.
Paris	France	The ship was disabled whilst on a voyage from Hamburg to Havre de Grâce, Seine-Inférieure. Her passengers were taken off by Princess Royal (United Kingdom).
Patriot	(United Kingdom of Great Britain and Ireland) Van Diemen's Land	The brig was wrecked in Twopeople's Bay, New Holland.
Phœnix	United Kingdom	The ship was wrecked on the coast of the Grand Duchy of Finland. She was on a voyage from London to Raahe, Grand Duchy of Finland.
Pomona	United Kingdom	The ship was abandoned before 8 October. Her crew were rescued.
Princess Royal	United Kingdom	The ship was driven ashore on the coast of County Donegal before 21 October. She was on a voyage from Liverpool to Westport, County Mayo. She was refloated and taken in to Donegal for repairs.
Promise	United Kingdom	The ship was driven ashore at Point St Laurent, British North America. She was on a voyage from Liverpool to Montreal, Province of Quebec. She was refloated on 5 October and towed in to Montreal.
Rebecca Margaretha	Bremen	The galiot was lost off "Tutters". Her crew were rescued. She was on a voyage from Narva, Russia to Bremen.
Ratchford or Richford	United Kingdom	The brig was abandoned in the Atlantic Ocean before 6 October.
Razalama	United Kingdom	The ship was abandoned in the Atlantic Ocean. She was at 47°10′N 37°40′W on 7 October and 46°30′N 32°20′W on 13 October.
Robert Bruce	United Kingdom	The ship was abandoned in the Atlantic Ocean. Her crew were rescued by Orion (United Kingdom). She subsequently came ashore on the Île d'Oléron, Charente-Maritime, France and was wrecked.
Rose	United Kingdom	The ship was abandoned in the Atlantic Ocean. Her crew were rescued by Orion (United Kingdom). She was on a voyage from Belfast, County Antrim to Quebec City.
Royal William	United Kingdom	The paddle steamer was driven ashore at Leith, Lothian in late October. She was refloated.
Sons of Commerce	United Kingdom	The ship was driven onto rocks off Bermuda before 2 October. She was on a voyage from Belize City, British Honduras to London. She was refloated on 12 October and resumed her voyage.
Spartan	United Kingdom	The ship was driven ashore and wrecked at Padstow before 23 October. She was on a voyage from Cardiff, Glamorgan to Livorno, Grand Duchy of Tuscany.
St. Louis	France	The brig was abandoned in the Atlantic Ocean (46°40′N 26°35′W) before 10 October.
Swallow	United Kingdom	The ship foundered in the Irish Sea. Her stern came ashore at Saltoun Bay, Cumberland on 28 October.
Tiberius	Hamburg	The ship sprang a leak and was abandoned in the North Sea between 12 and 20 October. Her crew were rescued by Hope (United Kingdom).
Twee Gebroeders	Belgium	The ship was driven ashore north of "Finlay". She was on a voyage from Riga, Russia to Dendermonde, East Flandes.
