= Calypso class =

Calypso class may refer to:

- Calypso-class corvette, a British Royal Navy steam corvette class
- Calypso-class spéronare, a French Navy sail transport class
