= Sanctuary of Our Lady of Tal-Ħerba =

- Santwarju tal-Madonna tal-Ħerba
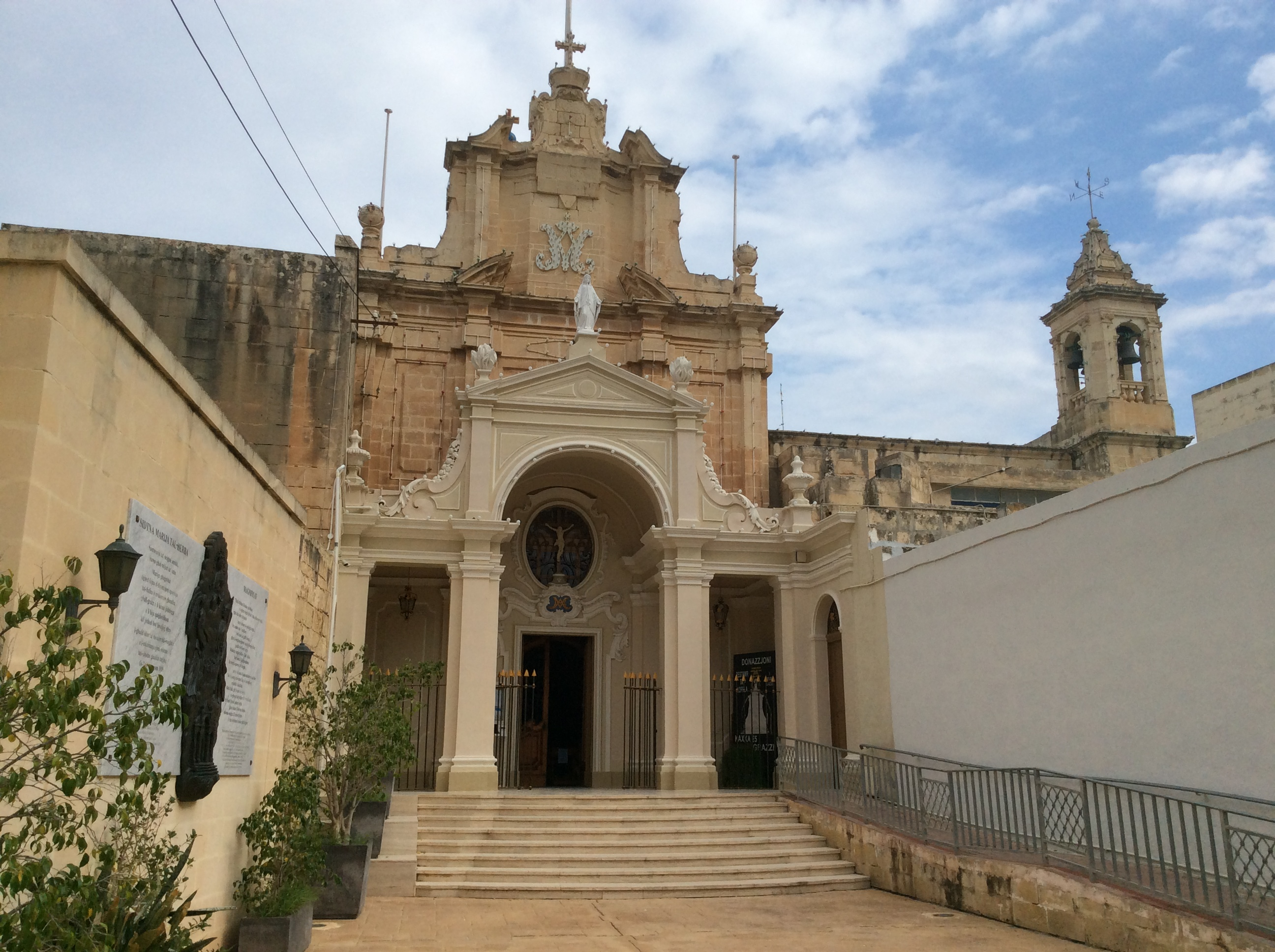
- The church's façade and portico in 2016
- Sanctuary of Our Lady of Tal-Ħerba
- 35°54′4.4″N 14°27′53.6″E
- Location: Birkirkara, Malta
- Denomination: Roman Catholic

History
- Status: Church
- Founded: c. 16th century or earlier
- Dedication: Nativity of Mary
- Dedicated: 23 March 1783

Architecture
- Functional status: Active
- Architect(s): Andrea/Edwin Vassallo (enlargement and dome)
- Style: Rococo
- Years built: 1610 (first church) c. 1644 (second church); 1774 (reconstruction); 1797 (portico and bell tower); 1923 (enlargement and dome)

Specifications
- Materials: Limestone

Administration
- Archdiocese: Malta
- Parish: Birkirkara (St Helen)

The Sanctuary of Our Lady of Tal-Ħerba (Maltese: Santwarju tal-Madonna tal-Ħerba) is a Roman Catholic church in Birkirkara, Malta, dedicated to the Nativity of Mary. It was constructed at various stages between the early 17th century and the 1920s, on the site of an earlier church which had existed since at least 1575.

Pope Pius X granted a Pontifical decree of coronation to the venerated Marian image on 13 February 1910 signed via Cardinal Mariano Rampolla y Tindaro, and notarized by Cardinal Angelo di Pietro. The rite of coronation was executed by Archbishop of Rhodes, Pietro Pace on August 7 of the same year.

== History ==
The first mention of a church on the site of the sanctuary is in a 1575 report by Pietro Dusina, in which he stated that it attracted some devotion. This building is believed to have been replaced by a new church in 1610. Bishop Baldassare Cagliares made a pastoral visit to various churches in Birkirkara in 1615, including to one dedicated to the Assumption of Mary which was referred to as Tal-Ħerba (meaning "of the ruin" in the Maltese language). The origins of this name or nickname are unclear, and a discredited theory stated it was a corruption of Tal-Ħarba (meaning "of the escape") in reference to fleeing Ottoman troops after the Great Siege of Malta of 1565. It might also be the case that the church was known as Tal-Ħerba because it was already old by the early 17th century, or that it got its name from the ruinous state of its surroundings at the time of its construction.

According to tradition, at one point a crippled man who had crutches heard the church's bell ringing and was miraculously healed after entering the building. This supposed miracle led to increased devotion to Our Lady of Tal-Ħerba among the Maltese population, and the church is said to have also attracted visitors from Sicily, mainland Italy, England, France and Spain. By 1640, the church had become too small to cater for these needs, and sometime before 1644 a new church dedicated to the Nativity of Mary was constructed in front of the original building. Over time the latter lost its importance and it was no longer used for worship by 1673. Some time later it was converted into a sacristy for the new building.

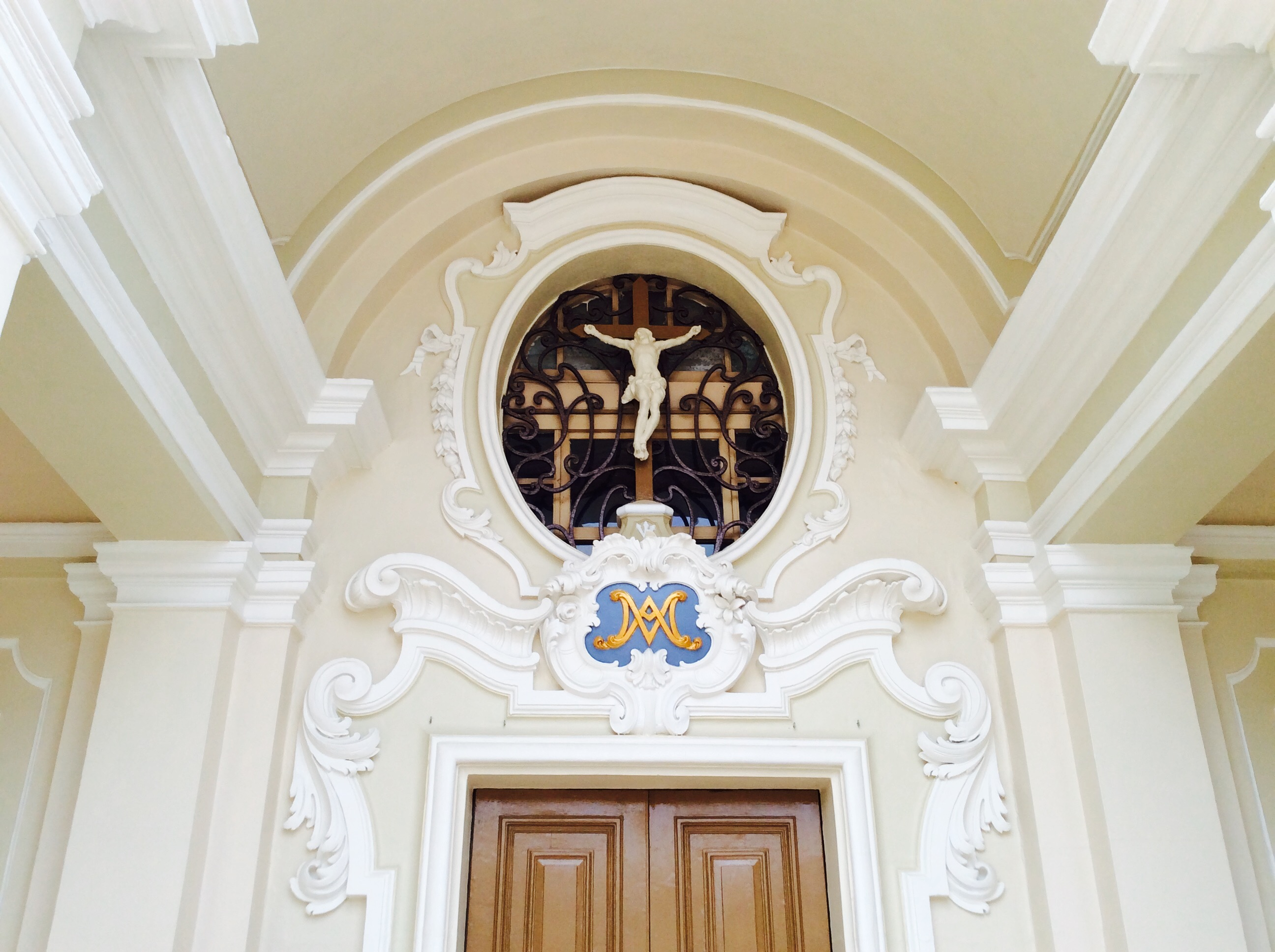
Crucifix above the church's entrance

In 1774, the old church was demolished and it was replaced by a Rococo building. It was dedicated by bishop Vincenzo Labini on 23 March 1783. Between the late 18th and early 20th centuries, various popes and bishops granted indulgences to the church, including Popes Clement XIV, Pius VI, Pius IX, Leo XIII and Pius X and bishops Labini, Gaetano Pace Forno and Pietro Pace. The church's portico and bell tower were added in 1797.

In 1923, the sanctuary was enlarged to its present configuration, and a dome was added. The bell tower, portico, side chapel, sacristy and oratory of the existing church were retained, and by this point almost no remains of the 1610 church still existed. This enlargement was officially the work of the architect Edwin Vassallo, although it is believed that the designs were actually made by his father Andrea Vassallo, who credited them to his son because he was prevented from carrying out private commissions due to his role as a government architect.

A hall to house ex-voto offerings was constructed in 1955, and some restoration work was carried out in the 1990s. The church falls under the jurisdiction of Birkirkara's parish of St Helen. The building is listed on the National Inventory of the Cultural Property of the Maltese Islands.

== Architecture ==
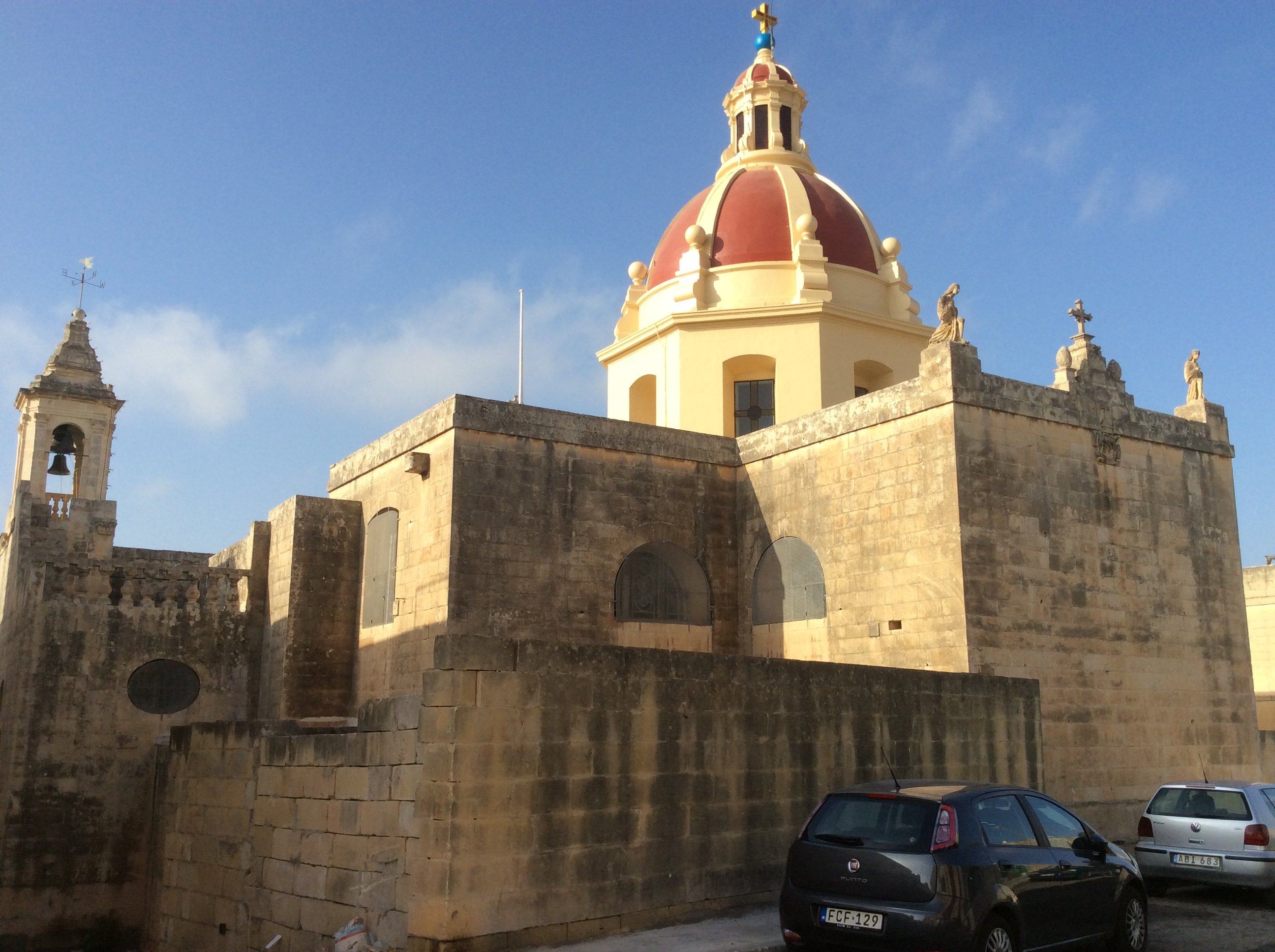
The church as viewed from the rear, with its dome visible

The church has a cruciform plan, and it includes a dome and a single bell tower. A long parvis is located in front of the church's façade, and a staircase leads to a portico which is topped by a statue of the Virgin Mary. The portico leads to the church's entrance, above which there is a crucifix.

Apart from the nave and altar in the choir, the church has a side chapel and a sacristy.

== Artworks ==
The church's altarpiece depicts the Virgin Mary along with John the Baptist, a guardian angel and souls in purgatory. It was painted between 1668 and 1679, and it replaced an earlier altarpiece which is now located in the sanctuary's side chapel. The painting was crowned by Bishop Pietro Pace on 7 August 1910.

The church also contains a number of other artworks, including paintings at side altars and frescoes on the dome and roof. These depict scenes from the life of the Virgin Mary, and they were painted by the artist Ġużeppi Briffa between 1926 and 1959.

The church also contains about 500 ex-voto paintings and other offerings, which are held in a special hall. This is the largest collection of ex-voto in Malta, and it includes around 183 paintings with maritime themes. Some of the ex-voto at Tal-Ħerba are of considerable historical significance: examples include a 1740 painting which is the oldest known depiction of a speronara and an 1840 painting which depicts the crew of a ship being massacred by pygmies in West Africa.
