= Gozo boat =

Settee-rigged boat originating from Malta

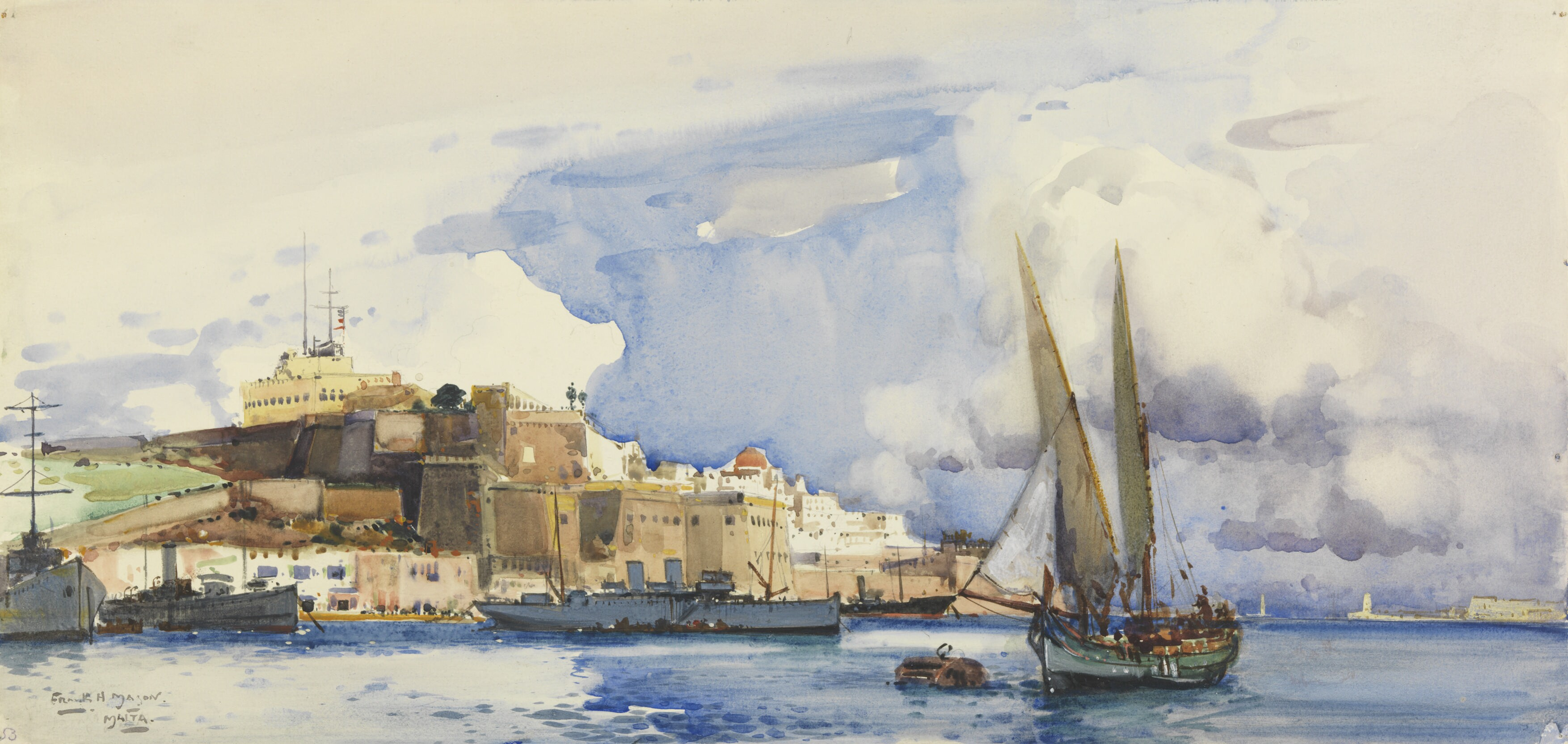
Painting of a Gozo boat in the Grand Harbour during World War I

The Gozo boat (Maltese: Dgħajsa ta' Għawdex, tal-latini, tat-tagħbija, tal-pass or tal-mogħdija) was a type of settee-rigged boat originating from Malta. Gozo boats were the main means of transport across the Gozo Channel between Gozo and the main island of Malta from the late 19th to the mid-20th century. The design of the boats developed from the speronara.

== History ==
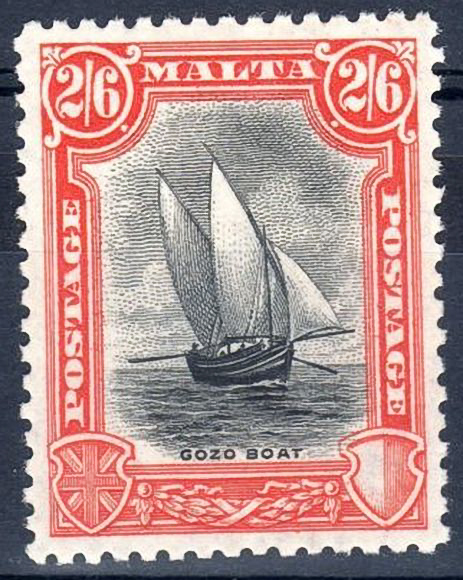
Gozo boat on a 1926 Maltese stamp

A ferry service between the islands of Malta and Gozo has existed for centuries, and the earliest known reference to such a link date back to around 1241, when the boat was called the madia or tal-mogħdija "of the route". By the 16th century, Gozo boats took the shape of a brigantine.

The earliest known depiction of a Gozo ferry is a painting from around 1750. At the time, the vessels were known as the speronara del Gozo or barca del Gozo, and they were almost identical to the speronara which was used for maritime trade.

The Gozo boat became distinct from the speronara in the late 19th century, around the same time that the vessel's use for mercantile activities was declining. In the 1880s, the Gozo speronaras changed their sail arrangements to a settee rig. They became known as tal-latini due to their similarity with lateen sails. In 1919, engines began to be installed on some Gozo boats, although many still retained their sails.

Most Gozo boats were built at Kalkara in the Grand Harbour. The Caruana family, who were the last builders of Gozo boats, moved from there to Mġarr on Gozo in 1940. After 1959, a few Gozo boats were built in Gela, Sicily. The last one to be built was the Santa Rita (G48) in 1963.

Gozo boats usually made trips from the Grand Harbour in Malta to Mġarr Harbour on Gozo. Other trips were made from the Grand Harbour to Mellieħa or to Marfa, or Mġarr to Marfa or St. Paul's Bay. The boats carried both passengers and cargo between the two islands. Trips from Gozo to Malta typically carried agricultural products, including fruit, vegetables, eggs, and poultry. Return trips from Malta to Gozo transported manufactured goods, such as cement, soft drinks, and beer.

Gozo boats were painted in shades of green, blue, red, and yellow, similar to the traditional luzzu. One boat, painted black, carried corpses between the islands.

=== Accidents ===
There were several accidents involving Gozo boats. Some were hit by rifle fire while passing the Pembroke Army Garrison rifle ranges, although authorities warned the boats' masters. In 1900, a Gozo boat that was being used for mahi-mahi (ampuki) fishing capsized, killing one fisherman. Another boat lost her masts in 1911, but managed to enter Saint George's Bay at St. Julian's, Malta. In 1926, an unoccupied Gozo boat was found adrift in rough seas. In rare cases, they were involved in collisions with tugboats or pinnaces.

During World War II, the Stella Maris was destroyed by enemy action.

=== Decline ===
By the 1960s and 1970s, regular steamer services began to compete with the Gozo boats, which had become less cost-effective. The remaining were converted into fishing boats, or were abandoned at Mġarr Harbour.

Since 1979, Gozo Channel Line, which uses modern roll-on/roll-off ferries, provides services to Gozo.

== Surviving examples ==
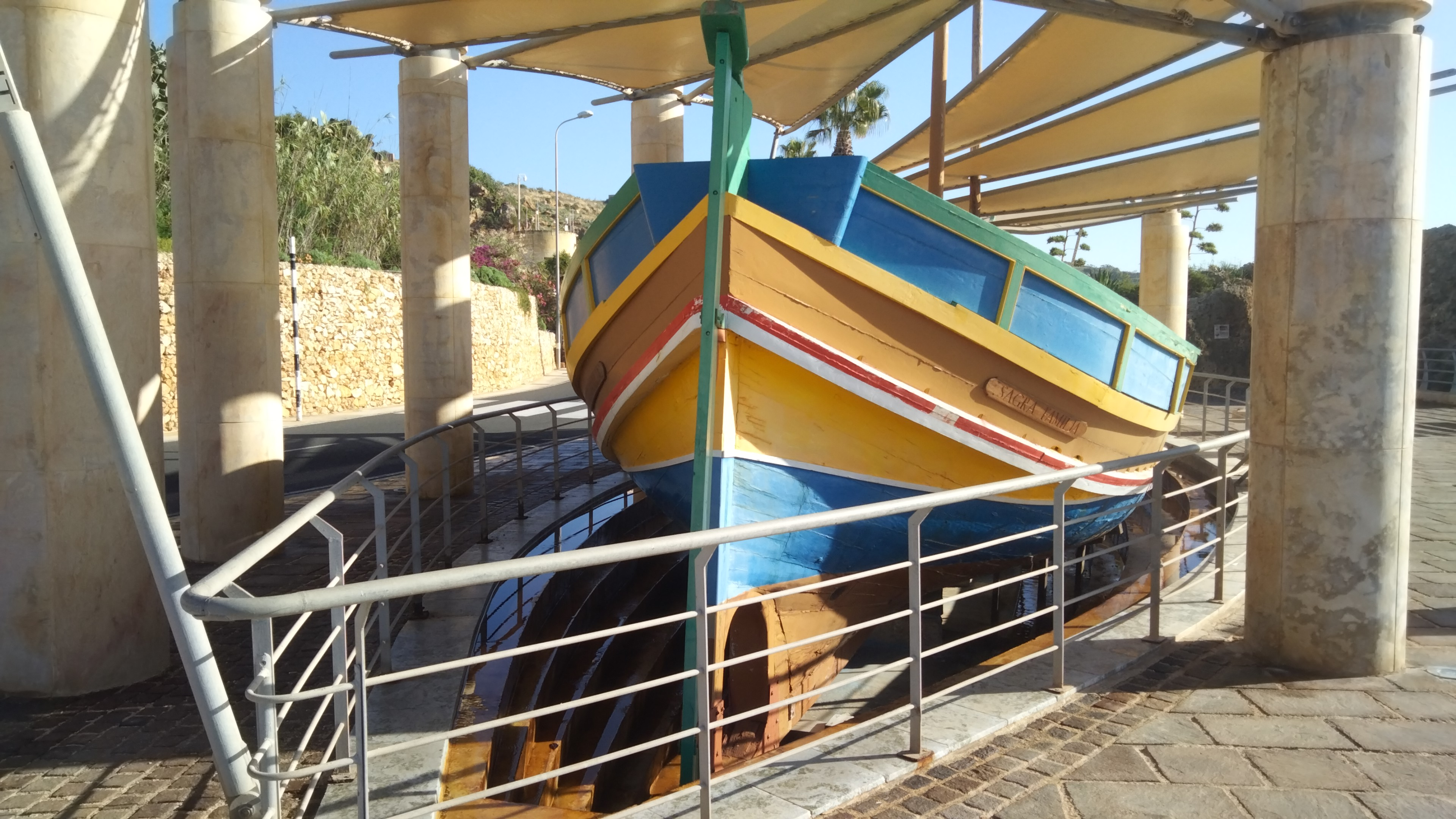
Sacra Famiglia preserved at the Żewwieqa promenade, as photographed in 2025

Very few Gozo boats still survive today. One of these is the Sacra Famiglia (G32), which was built in Kalkara in 1933. It had become unseaworthy by the 1970s, and was beached at Mġarr. The hulk was eventually purchased by a private individual who wanted to sell it to the Ministry for Gozo. It was then purchased by the Gozo Channel Company Limited, who handed it to Wirt Għawdex and sponsored its restoration. After the boat was restored by the Caruana brothers (the sons of its original builder), it was placed on permanent display at the Żewwieqa promenade in 2014.

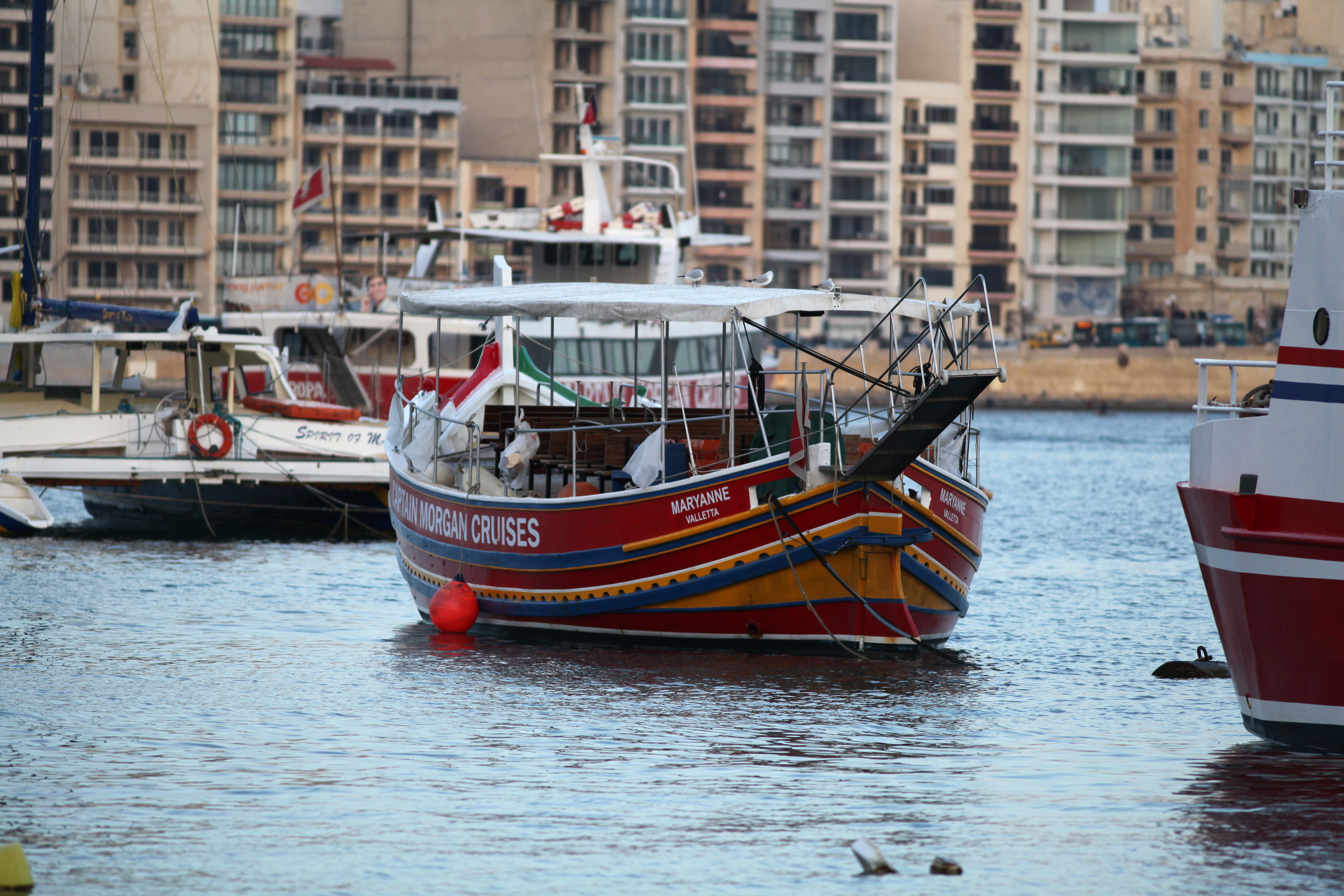
Maryanne at Marsamxett Harbour, as photographed in 2013

Another surviving Gozo boat is the Maryanne, which belonged to Alfred Grech and was built in Gela in 1960. The boat remained in Gozo until February 1983, when it was purchased by Captain Morgan Cruises. The boat is now in display at the Mcast in Paola. Maryanne is in good condition, but it no longer has the distinctive masts and a deck has been added.

Another two or three Gozo boats which were converted into fishing boats might still exist.

== Legacy ==
Coat of arms of Qala

The Gozo boat has become a symbol of the island of Gozo, and a boat sailing on rough waters is featured on the flag and coat of arms of the village of Qala. Gozo boats are also found in the logos of various Gozitan organizations, such as the Gozo Philatelic Society and the Imperial Gozo Yacht Club.

The classical 1970s song Id-Dgħajsa tal-Latini by the Maltese band New Cuorey is about a Gozo boat.

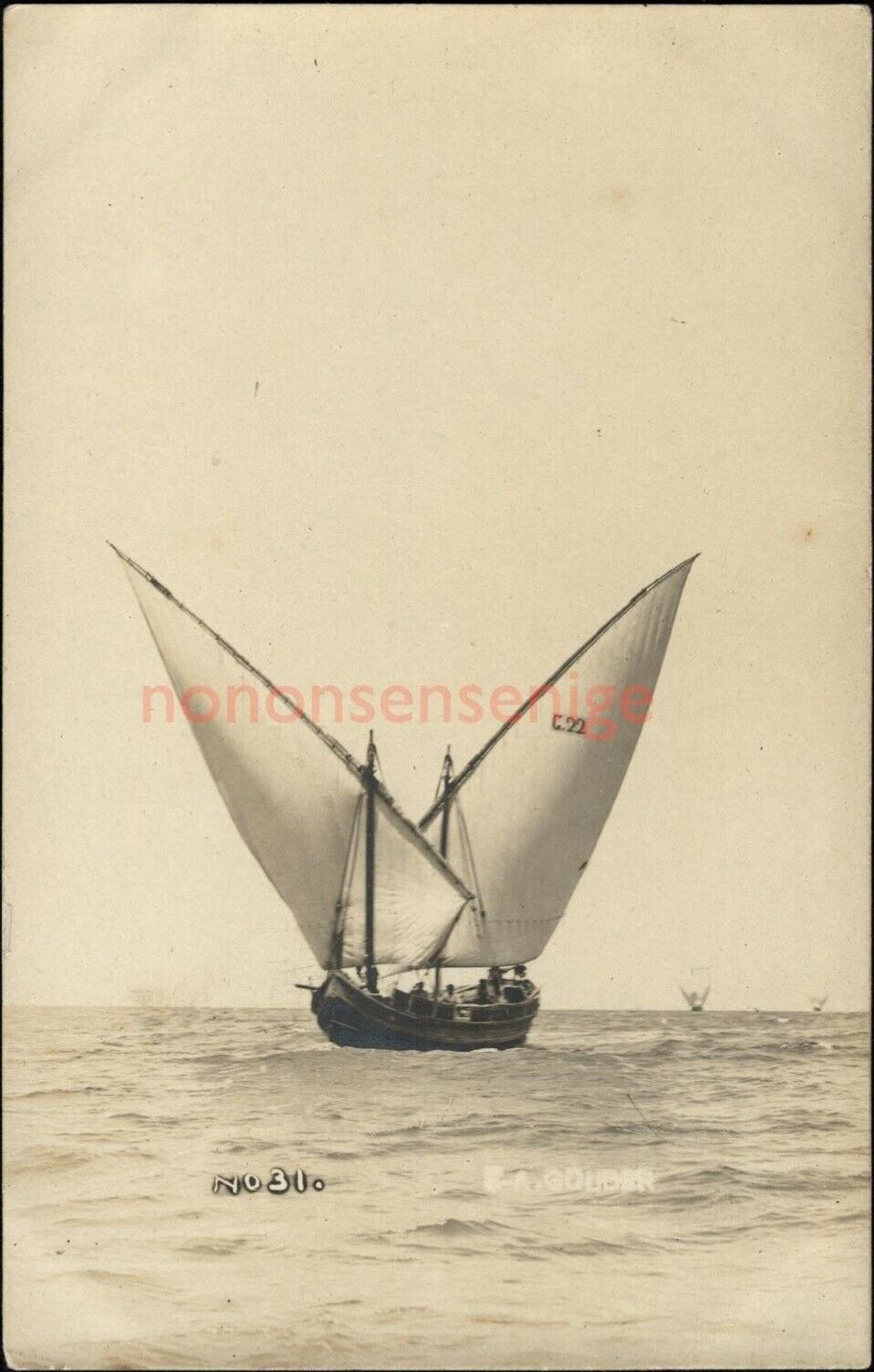
E.A.Gouder, Fishing boat, Gozo (No. 31)

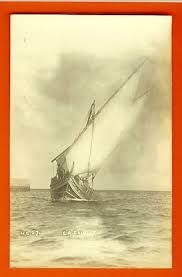
E.A.Gouder, Gozitan fishing boat (No. 27)

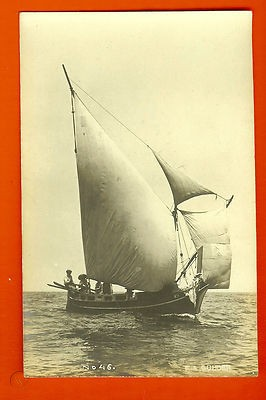
E.A.Gouder, Gozitan fishing boat (No. 46)

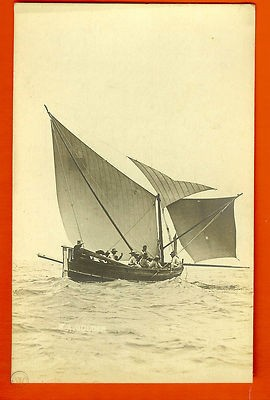
E.A.Gouder, Gozitan fishing boat

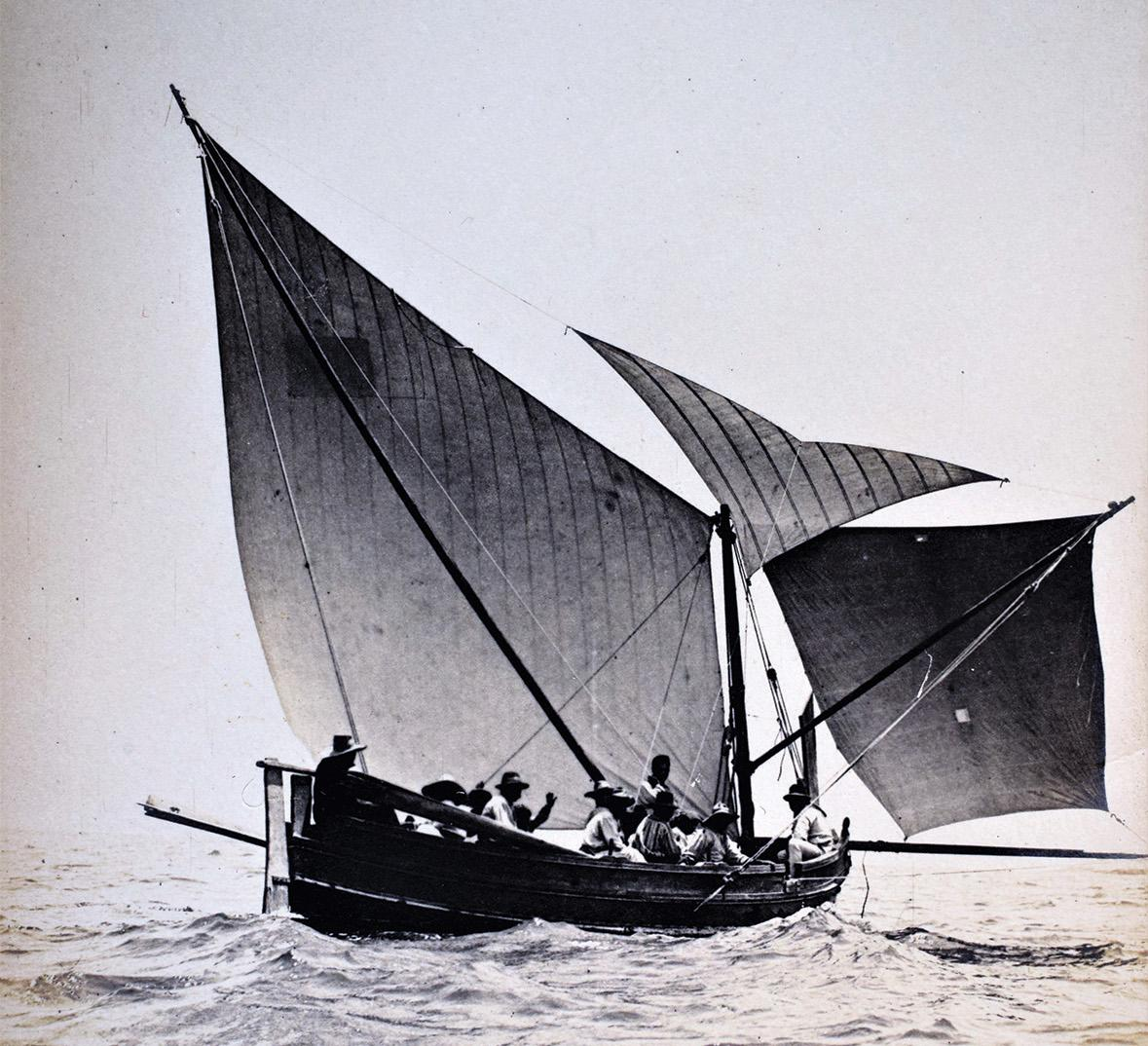
Edward A. Gouder, A Gozo boat, tal-latini, in full sail, 1910s
