= Settee (sail) =

Type of sail

The settee sail was a lateen sail with the front corner cut off, giving it a quadrilateral shape. The settee sail requires a shorter yard than does the lateen, and both settee and lateen have shorter masts than square-rigged sails.

== History of the sail form ==
The settee's history can be traced back to navigation in the Mediterranean Sea in late antiquity; the oldest evidence is from a late 5th-century ship in a Roman mosaic at Kelenderis in Cilicia on the southern coast of Anatolia (now Aydıncık, Mersin). It lasted well into the 20th century as a common sail on Arab dhows and on the Gozo boat of Malta.

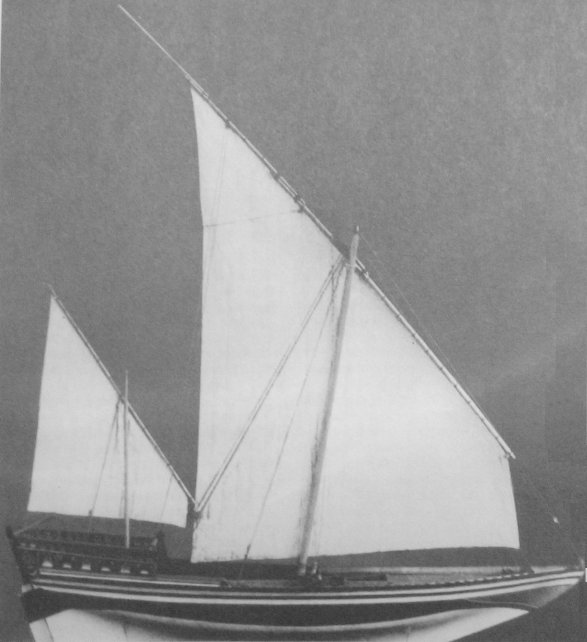
Model of a sambuk with two settee sails

== Settee (boat) ==
Settees (or saëtia) then were a sharp-prowed, single-decked merchant sailing vessel found in the Mediterranean (more in the Levant than in the Western Mediterranean), in the 18th and 19th centuries. The Spaniards also used them in the New World.

Settees had two lateen-rigged masts, like xebecs or galleys, but carrying settee sails. They sailed well to windward and could sail downwind. Some polaccas carried a settee sail, giving rise to the polacca-settee (or polacre-settee).

Between the 1880s and the 1960s, Gozo boats had a settee rig.

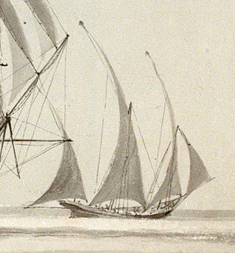
A Mediterranean settee, with two masts, both of which have lateen sails. William Pocock circa 1813

== See also ==
- Lateen (a triangular sail)
- Tanja sail
- Crab claw sail

== Sources ==
- Whitewright, Julian (2009), "The Mediterranean Lateen Sail in Late Antiquity", The International Journal of Nautical Archaeology, vol. 38, no. 1, pp. 97–104, Bibcode:2009IJNAr..38...97W, doi:10.1111/j.1095-9270.2008.00213.x
