= Calypso-class spéronare =

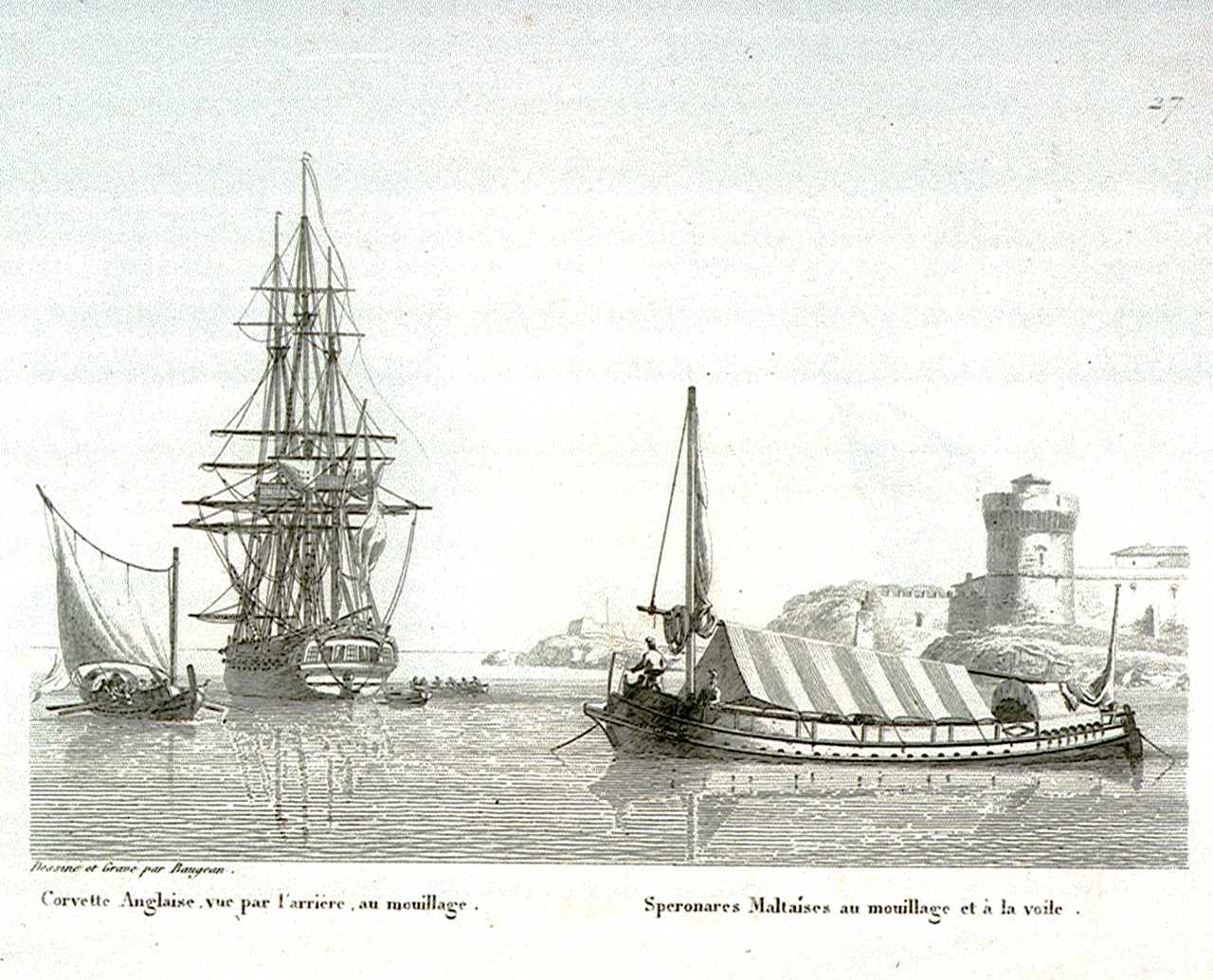
- Rear view of an anchored British Royal Navy sloop, and two Maltese spéronares, one at anchor and one under sail, National Maritime Museum.

Class overview
- Name: Calypso class
- Builders: Pierre-Charles Dupin, Corfu
- Operators: French Navy
- Completed: 2
- Lost: 2

General characteristics
- Type: Spéronare
- Displacement: 12/22 (unladen/laden; French tons)
- Length: 15.5 m (50 ft 10 in)
- Beam: 4.4 m (14 ft 5 in)
- Sail plan: Lateen
- Complement: 23
- Armament: 1 × 10-pounder carronade, equivalent to a 12-pounder (British) carronade

The Calypso class consisted of two spéronares constructed at Corfu, one in 1812 and one in 1813. The two vessels, Calypso and Nausicaa, appear to have been highly similar, and Nausicaa was described as fast both under sail and oars.

== Calypso ==
Launched 17 August 1812, and named for Calypso of Greek mythology.

On 6 January 1813, the boats of HMS Bacchante and HMS Weazle captured five armed French vessels sailing from Corfu to Otranto to convoy the payment for the troops on the island. The British stated that the French resisted, but the British suffered no casualties. The five were:

- Calypso, one 12-pounder, and 50 men under the command of enseigne de vaisseau de Luce;
- Salamine, one 9-pounder, one 6-pounder, and 36 men under the command of enseigne de vaisseau Benenquier;
- Indomptable, one 14-pounder gun, one 6-pounder, and 36 men under the command of enseigne de vaisseau Eyffren;
- Arrogante, one 14-pounder, one 6-pounder, and 40 men under the command of officier de flotilla Baffert;
- Diligente, one 14-pounder, one 6-pounder, and 36 men under the command of aspirante de 2ème class Ballot.

The British captured all but Diligente, which sank. (Note: A first-class share of the prize money was worth £90 2s 9¾d; a sixth-class share was worth 15s 11¼d.) The subsequent French court martial ordered all five commanders barred from command for three years. (Note: The identification above of the commanding officers comes from the Fonds Marine.)

== Nausicaa ==
Nausicaa was launched in April 1813, and named for the Homeric character Nausicaa. The British seized her in June 1814 at Corfu.
