= Speronara =

Small merchant ship originating in Malta

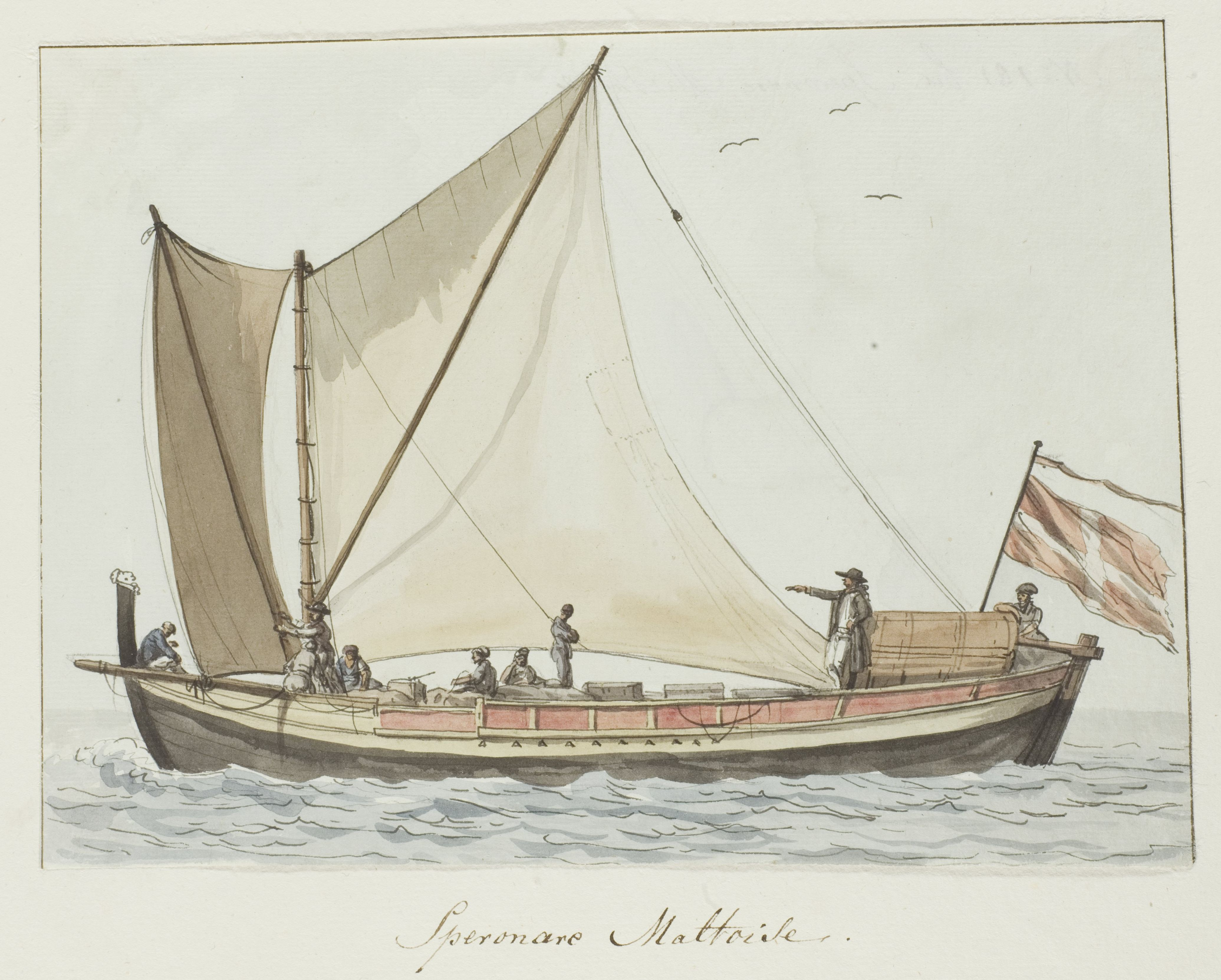
Maltese speronara flying the Hospitaller flag as depicted in a 1778 painting by Abraham-Louis-Rodolphe Ducros

The speronara (Maltese: xprunara, French: spéronare) was a small merchant ship originating in Malta that was used in the Mediterranean Sea from the 16th to the early 20th centuries. The vessels usually had no deck and only one mast, often with a lateen or spritsail. Some larger vessels had a half deck or up to three masts.

They were common in the trade between Malta and Sicily, and they also traveled to other ports in the Mediterranean. They were used to carry passengers or merchandise and they were often involved in smuggling. In some cases, the boats were also used for fishing, corsairing or as gunboats, with the French Navy's Calypso-class spéronares being examples of the latter.

== History ==
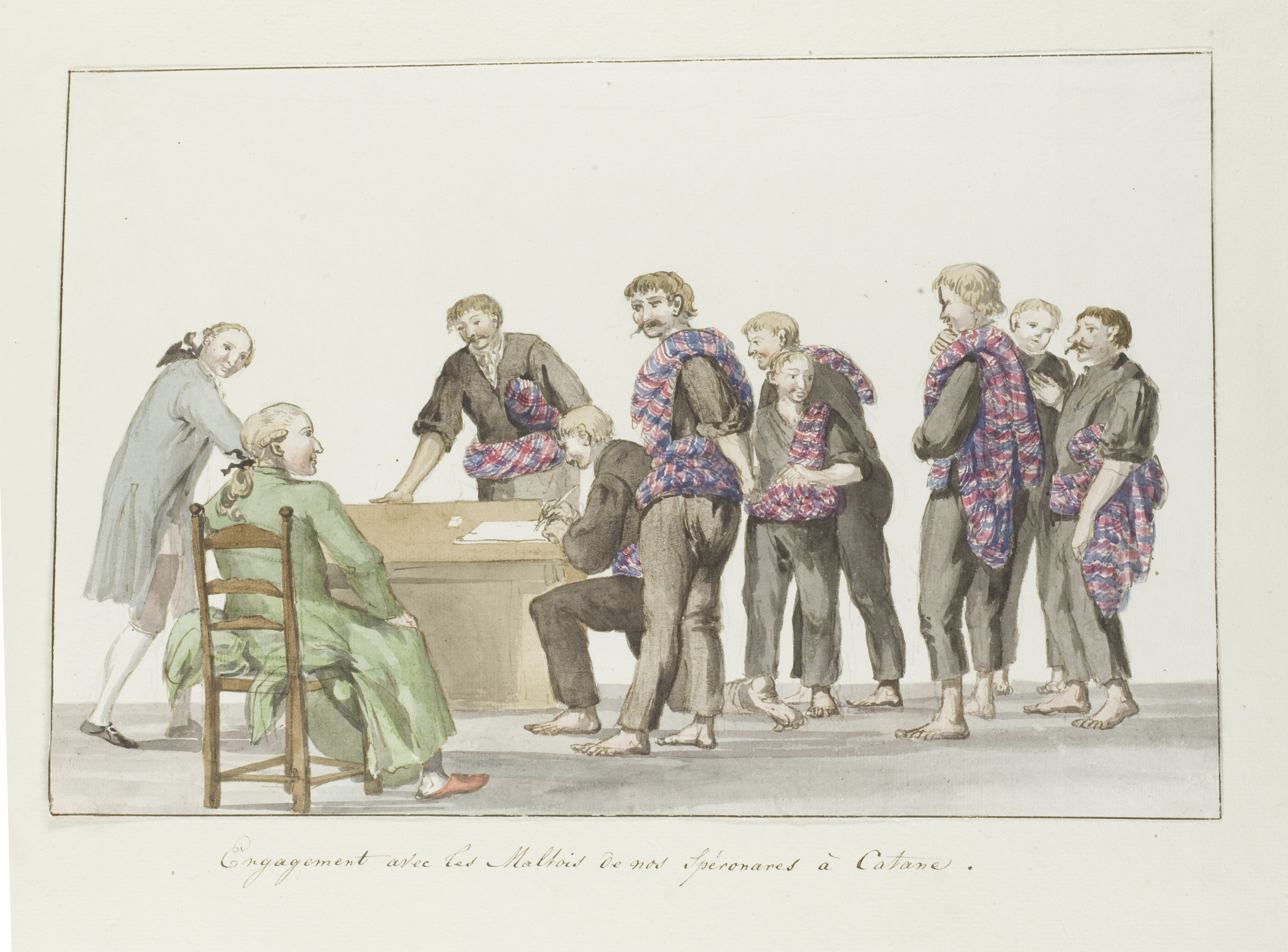
Crew of a Maltese speronara in Catania as depicted in a 1778 painting by Abraham-Louis-Rodolphe Ducros

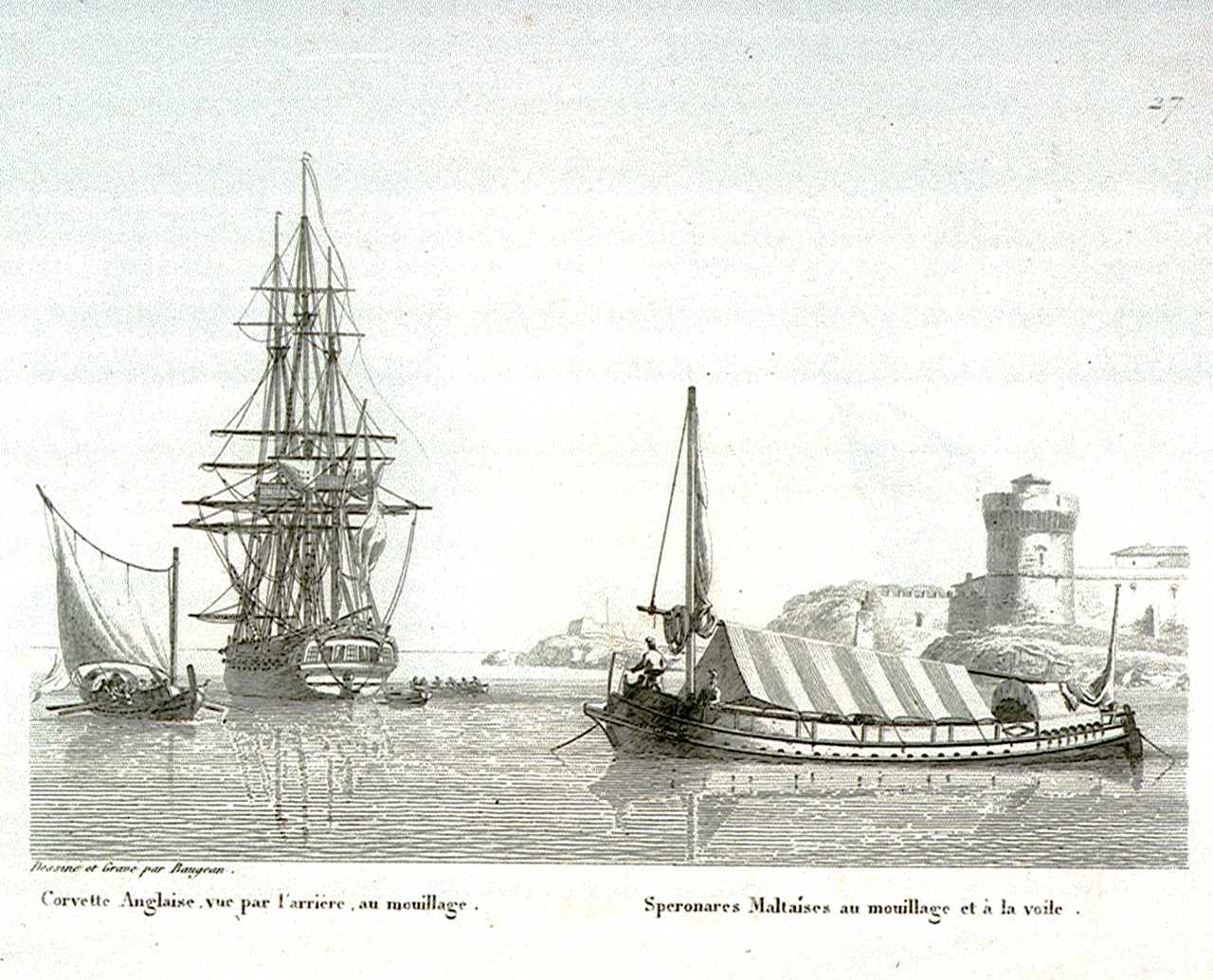
Rear view of an anchored British Royal Navy sloop, and two Maltese speronaras, one at anchor and one under sail, National Maritime Museum

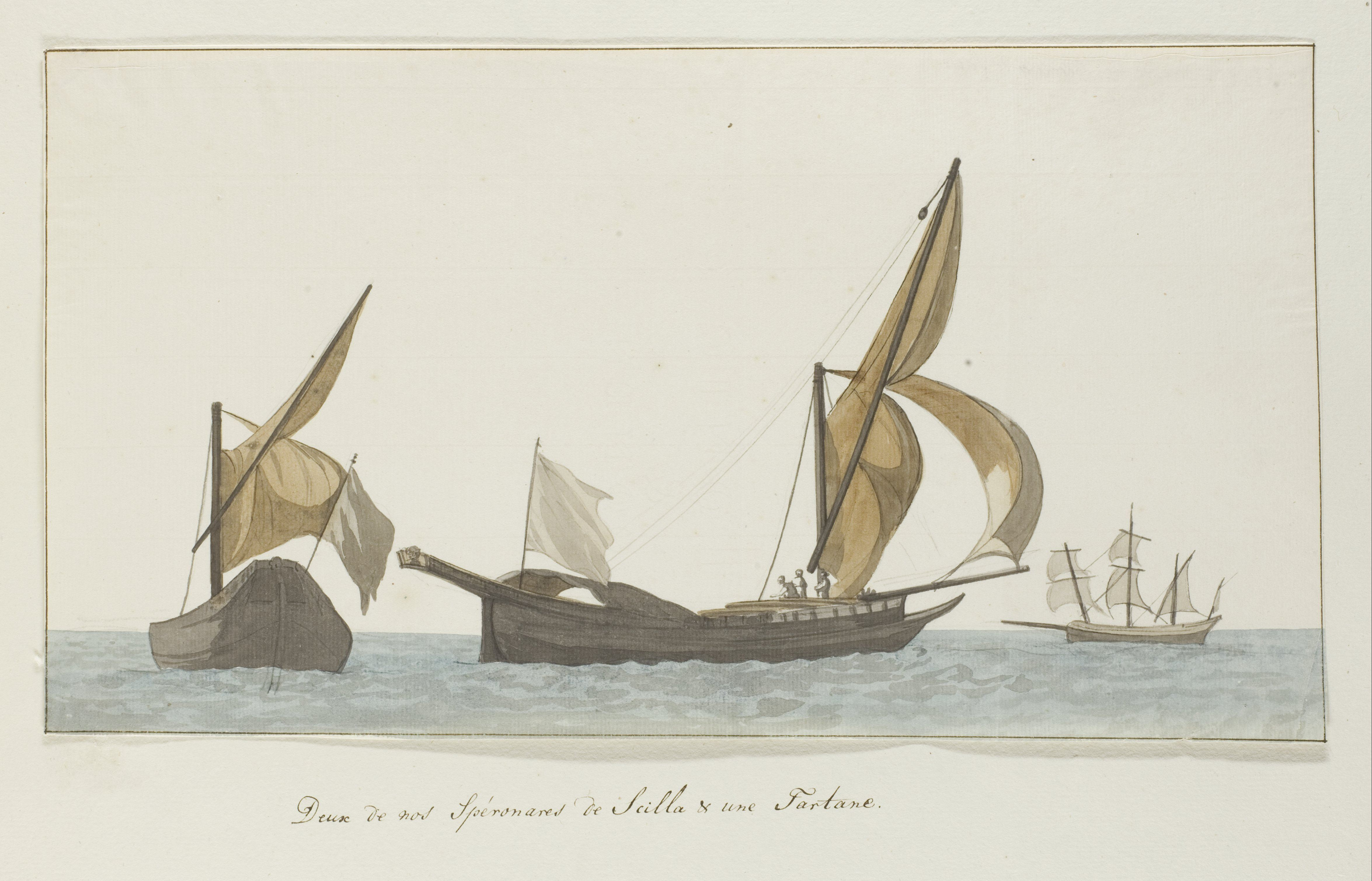
Two speronaras from Scilla and a tartana as depicted in a 1778 painting by Abraham-Louis-Rodolphe Ducros

The speronara originated in Malta, and its design probably developed from the brigantine in around the 16th century. The earliest known possible reference of the vessel type is from 1576, but the earliest reliable source which mentions it is from 1614. The oldest known depiction of the vessel is a 1740 ex-voto painting at the Sanctuary of Our Lady of Tal-Ħerba. Early speronaras are believed to have had a sperone or spur at the bow, from which they took their name. During the period of Hospitaller rule in Malta, speronaras were exclusively named after Christian saints. When Malta was under British rule, many of the vessels had feminine secular names, although some continued to be named after saints. In the 19th century, speronaras were constructed by shipbuilders in the Grand Harbour's French Creek.

Speronaras usually departed from the Grand Harbour or St Paul's Bay, and they commonly carried passengers and merchandise between Malta and Sicily. They often carried grain or corn, but sometimes they also carried livestock. Such journeys between Malta and Sicily would take about 12 hours. Before there was an organised postal service, masters of speronaras might carry private correspondence for a fee. Speronaras also made short trips to Gozo, and longer voyages to other Mediterranean destinations such as Naples, Reggio Calabria, Rome, Livorno, Genoa, Marseille, and ports in Spain. Some passed through the Strait of Gibraltar and went as far as Cádiz.

Some speronaras saw limited use in the navy of the Order of Saint John. In 1618, three speronaras were pressed into service alongside the Order's galleys to participate in an attack against enemy ships in Susa. A speronara accompanied a galley squadron in 1663, and in 1733 one speronara spied on Ottoman shipping in Corfu. Speronaras were also used for guard duties in the Grand Harbour. The vessels often fell prey to the Barbary corsairs, and there are also instances of Maltese corsairs using speronaras to capture small enemy vessels. Other roles for speronaras included smuggling and fishing.

The French Navy occasionally built or acquired speronaras, arming them and using them as gunboats. The Calypso-class spéronares Calypso and Nausicaa were examples. Some speronaras were also purchased by owners from Italy or North Africa, and some Sicilian boat builders incorporated elements from the speronara in their own boats. The speronara also influenced the design of other traditional Maltese boats, including the Gozo boat or dgħajsa tal-latini.

Due to technology and socio-economic factors, the speronara became obsolete by the late 19th century, and this type of vessel disappeared in the early 20th century.

== Description ==
Speronaras were small, double-ended boats which usually had no deck, but were sometimes half-decked. They had a high prow with a beak at the bow, and like other traditional Maltese vessels they had little sheer except at the bow and stern. The side of the boat had washboards, and the vessels were often brightly coloured. Speronaras had a small cabin near the stern to accommodate passengers.

Speronaras usually had a length of around 24–30 feet (7.3–9.1 m). From the mid-19th century, some speronaras were built to much larger dimensions, and some were over 60 feet (18 m) long. Speronaras were equipped with both oars and sails.

Most speronaras had a single mast, although in the 19th century some of the larger vessels had two or three. Early speronaras had a single mast with a lateen sail and a jib, but the spritsail (Maltese: tarkija) was introduced in around the 17th century and it was commonly used on single masted speronaras. Larger vessels of two or three masts had lateen sails. In the late 19th century, there were some attempts to introduce schooner rigging on speronaras.

Speronaras were usually manned by a master and four to six crewmen, who were rowers but also handled the sails. Depending on the size of the boat, some had a larger crew of up to twelve people.

== Legacy ==
Speronaras appeared on a 20c Malta stamp in 1982, on the Lm 5 denomination of the fourth series of Maltese lira banknotes issued in 1986, and on a Lm 10 gold coin minted by the Central Bank of Malta in 2002.

== See also ==
- Gozo boat
