= JB Catalogue =

Stamp catalogue

The cover of the 2012 edition of the catalogue.

The J.B. Catalogue of Malta Stamps and Postal History is Malta's leading stamp catalogue. It was first published in 1984 and is published bi-annually by Joseph Buttigieg of Sliema Stamp Shop. It is currently in its twenty-second edition (2014). The catalogue originally used the SG numbering system, but from the early 1990s it had separate numbering. It is in English and the prices were denominated in Maltese pounds until 2006, and euros from 2008.

The twentieth edition (2010) was awarded the Silver-Bronze Medal in Phila Nippon '11 Japan World Stamp Exhibition, which held in Yokohama between 28 July and 2 August 2011, and the twenty first edition (2012) was awarded the silver medal in the Australia 2013 FIP World Stamp Exhibition, which was held at the Royal Exhibition Building in Melbourne between 10 and 15 May 2013.

== Contents ==
The JB Catalogue lists all of Malta's stamps and stationery, philatelic material issued by MaltaPost and a number of items relating to Malta's postal history.

=== Stamps ===
- GB stamps used in Malta (1857–1884)
- Postage stamps (1860- )
- Air Mail stamps (1928–1984)
- Miniature Sheets (1971- )
- FRAMA labels (2002)
- Stamp booklets (1970- )
- Postage Due stamps (1925–1993)
- Revenue stamps (1899–1988)
- National Insurance stamps (1956–1974)
- Specimen stamps (1860–1969)
- Errors (1860–2001)

=== Postal stationery ===
- Post paid postcards (1885–1944)
- Post paid newspaper wrappers (1885–1913)
- Registered envelopes (1885–1995)
- Post paid envelopes (1900, 2002- )
- Formular aerogrammes (1969–1991)
- Post paid aerogrammes (1971)

=== Philatelic material ===
- Postal cards (1980- )
- Maximum cards (1981- )
- Said's maximum cards (1984–1994)
- Year pack postcards (1996–2005)
- Philatelic Bureau cards (2001-2012)
- Postcards (issued by MaltaPost) (2001– )
- Occasion Cards (2001- )

=== Postmarks, cachets and postal history ===
- Special handstamp cancellations (1924- )
- Valletta postmarks prior to 1921
- Village postmarks (1887–1954)
- Modern postmarks (1954- )
- Postmen's handstamps (Bollo personale) (1888-1949)
- Postage Due handstamps (1819–1923)
- Disinfected mail - red wax seals (c.1816-1844)
- Disinfected mail - cachets (1830–1911)
- Air mail/first flight covers (1928- )
- Zeppelin flights (1933–1935)
- Hot air balloon flights (1970–1983)
- Other interesting cancellations

== See also ==
- Postage stamps and postal history of Malta
