= Malta Saint Paul 10s black =

Rare Maltese postage stamp

10/- St Paul's Shipwreck
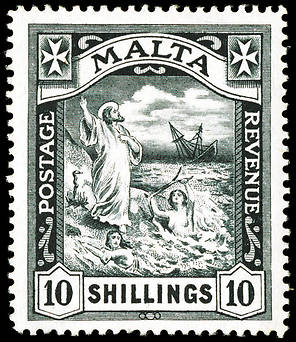
- Type: Definitive postage and revenue stamp
- Country of issue: Malta
- Date of production: October 1913
- Date of issue: 6 March 1919
- Printer: De La Rue, London, UK
- Perforation: 13.75
- Depicts: St Paul's Shipwreck
- Nature of rarity: Few printed
- No. printed: 1530
- Face value: 10 shillings
- Estimated value: £3250–£4500

The St Paul's Shipwreck 10/- black is a postage and revenue stamp issued by the Crown Colony of Malta on 6 March 1919, and it is generally considered to be the country's rarest and most expensive stamp. It is rare because a very limited quantity of 1530 stamps was printed and it was inadvertently issued prematurely by the Post Office.

The stamp had been printed by De La Rue in 1913, and its design was based on an 1899 postage stamp which depicted the same scene but had different inscriptions around the frame. A reprint of the 1919 design was issued in 1922 with a different watermark, and this was more numerous resulting in the stamp not being as rare as the previous issue.

== Background and design ==
On 4 February 1899, Malta issued a set of four definitive postage stamps which showed pictorial scenes. This was the first set of Malta stamps which did not feature the portrait of the reigning British monarch (then Queen Victoria). The highest denomination in the set was the 10/-, which depicted the shipwreck of Paul the Apostle on Malta as described in the Acts of the Apostles. The design was adapted from an engraving by the French artist Gustave Doré, which shows St Paul standing on land while other survivors from the shipwreck are in the sea attempting to reach the shore. The sinking ship is visible on the horizon.

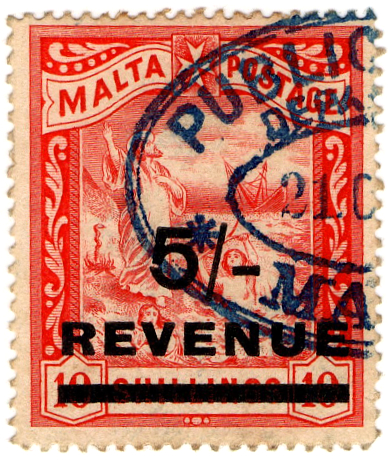
Special printing of the 1899 design in red, overprinted as a 5/- revenue stamp in 1908

The 1899 stamp was issued solely for postal purposes, and it was duly inscribed "MALTA POSTAGE" at the top. In late 1901, this stamp was overprinted "REVENUE" for use as a revenue stamp, and this overprinted version was issued on Malta in around 1902. In 1908, a special printing of the stamp in red was overprinted and additionally surcharged for use as a 5/- revenue stamp. A change in procedure led to postage stamps becoming valid for fiscal (revenue) use on 1 April 1913, and separate revenue issues were discontinued at this point. The unoverprinted 1899 stamp was therefore used both postally and fiscally after 1913.

== The 1919 issue ==
In 1912 and 1913, plans were made to update the 1899 design in order to reflect the new situation in which stamps were equally valid for postal and fiscal use. A design was prepared in which the "MALTA POSTAGE" text at the top was replaced by the word "MALTA", while the inscriptions "POSTAGE" and "REVENUE" were placed on the left and right borders of the design. The central motif depicting the shipwreck and the face value at the bottom remained unchanged.

Printing of the stamp with the revised design began in October 1913, and a limited quantity of 1530 stamps (consisting of 51 sheets of 30 stamps each) was printed and sent to Malta. The Post Office planned to release this stamp after stocks of the 1899 issue were exhausted, but the stamp was inadvertently issued prematurely at the Valletta post office on 6 March 1919. Many of the stamps were purchased by notaries who used them for fiscal purposes, and the stamp sold out within a couple of days.

== Later issues ==
A reprint of the stamp was issued on 19 January 1922, and this is identical to the 1919 issue but it has a different watermark. A larger quantity was issued, and this stamp is worth considerably less than the rare issue.

Malta had been granted a limited form of self-government in 1921, and to commemorate this, existing stocks of stamps were overprinted "SELF-GOVERNMENT" diagonally at the Government Printing Office in Valletta. Both the 1899 and 1922 versions of the St Paul's Shipwreck stamp were overprinted and they were issued on 12 January and 9 March 1922 respectively. The 1919 stamp was not overprinted.

== Technical details ==
All the St Paul's Shipwreck stamps issued between 1899 and 1922 were recess-printed by De La Rue in London. The watermark used on the rare 1919 issue is known as Multiple Crown CA, since it consists of the letters "CA" (referring to the Crown Agents) beneath a representation of a crown, arranged multiple times next to each other. The 1899 and 1922 versions have different watermarks, which are known as Crown CC and Multiple Script CA respectively. The former consists of a crown above the letters "CC", while the latter is similar to the Multiple Crown CA watermark but with a different design for the crown and the letters having a script typeface.

The 1919 and 1922 stamps were perforated with gauge 13.75 comb perforations. The perforations of the 1899 stamps had the same gauge, but they were line perforated.

The table below lists all the versions of the St Paul's Shipwreck design on Malta's postage, revenue or dual-purpose stamps between 1899 and 1922:

Denomination	Colour	Validity	Details	Watermark	Date of issue
10/-	blue-black	Postage (before 1913); Postage and revenue (after 1913)	Original issue, inscribed "MALTA POSTAGE"	Crown CC	4 February 1899
10/-	blue-black	Revenue	1899 issue (inscribed "MALTA POSTAGE") overprinted "REVENUE" in black	Crown CC	c. early 1902
5/- on 10/-	carmine	Revenue	Special printing (inscribed "MALTA POSTAGE") overprinted "5/- REVENUE" in black	Multiple Crown CA	c. July 1908
10/-	black	Postage and revenue	Inscribed "MALTA POSTAGE REVENUE"	Multiple Crown CA	6 March 1919
10/-	blue-black	Postage and revenue	1899 issue (inscribed "MALTA POSTAGE") overprinted "SELF-GOVERNMENT" in red	Crown CC	12 January 1922
10/-	black	Postage and revenue	Inscribed "MALTA POSTAGE REVENUE"	Multiple Script CA	19 January 1922
10/-	black	Postage and revenue	1922 issue (inscribed "MALTA POSTAGE REVENUE") overprinted "SELF-GOVERNMENT" in red	Multiple Script CA	9 March 1922

== Sale and collecting ==
Due to the low quantity printed, stocks of the 1919 stamp ran out before many stamp collectors managed to purchase it. It was expected that a reprint would be made, and initially the stamp did not sell for much more than its face value. When the reprint was issued in 1922 and it had a different watermark, the 1919 stamp became highly sought after since this was regarded as a different stamp from the more numerous 1922 reprint.

Today, the 10/- of 1919 is generally considered to be the rarest and most expensive Malta stamp. (Note: There are some stamps with errors which are rarer and more expensive than the 1919 St Paul's Shipwreck stamp, but the latter is the most expensive regular stamp issue.) Postally used copies are worth more than mint ones, and as of 2015 it is catalogued at £3250 mint and £4500 used in the Stanley Gibbons catalogue. Stamps with a specimen overprint or those which were fiscally used are worth less than these prices.

The other 10/- stamps issued between 1899 and 1922 are also sought after by collectors, but they are much less expensive than the 1919 issue. As of 2015, these stamps have catalogue prices ranging between £65 and £800 in the Stanley Gibbons catalogue.

== Legacy ==
Apart from the 1899–1922 issues, Saint Paul was featured on many other Malta stamps issued during the 20th century, and all definitive sets issued between 1927 and 1956 had a 10/- stamp which depicted a statue of the saint. The saint therefore appeared on all 10/- Malta stamps except for the 1922–1926 Melita issue, the 1965 definitive (where he was depicted on the £1 stamp) and some revenue stamps.

The 10/- of 1919 appeared as a stamp on stamp on an issue commemorating the 25th anniversary of the Malta Philatelic Society on 6 March 1991. MaltaPost issued a special postmark to commemorate the centenary of the stamp's issue on 6 March 2019. This postmark was used at the post office of Victoria, Gozo, and it was made at the initiative of the Gozo Philatelic Society, which also produced commemorative postcards for the anniversary.

== See also ==
- Postage stamps and postal history of Malta
