= Halfpenny Yellow =

First postage stamp issued by the Crown Colony of Malta

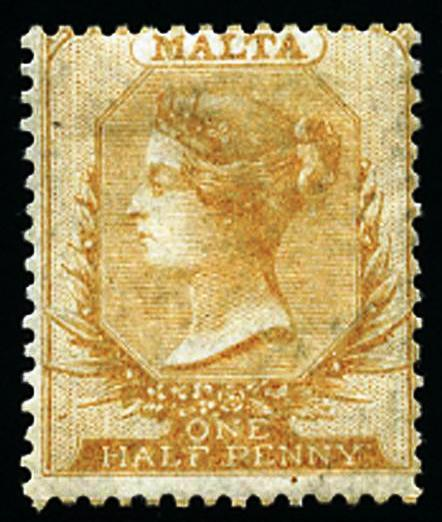
- Type: Definitive local postage stamp
- Country of issue: Malta
- Date of issue: 1 December 1860– September 1884
- Engraver: Jean Ferdinand Joubert de la Ferté
- Printer: De La Rue, London, UK
- Perforation: 14, 12½ or 14 x 12½
- Depicts: Queen Victoria
- Notability: First Maltese stamp
- Nature of rarity: Classic stamp
- No. printed: 1,223,760
- Face value: ½ penny
- Estimated value: £20–£1400

The Halfpenny Yellow is the first postage stamp issued by the Crown Colony of Malta. Depicting Queen Victoria, it was only valid for local postage and it was originally issued on 1 December 1860. It was the only stamp issued by Malta for two and a half decades, and during this period various reprints were made with differences in colour shade, perforation and watermark. When control of Malta's postal service was transferred to the island's colonial government on 1 January 1885, the stamp was withdrawn and it was replaced by a set of definitive stamps.

== Design, production and issue ==
An experimental free daily postal service for letters and newspapers was introduced between Valletta, the Three Cities, Gozo and some of the larger towns in Malta on 10 June 1853. British postage stamps were introduced in the islands in August 1857 for use on mail sent from Malta to foreign destinations. In 1859, the Council of Government decided that the free local postal service was to be withdrawn, and on 12 March 1859 the Committee of Supply set aside the sum of £110 for the cost of ordering a halfpenny stamp for local postage. The government informed the Crown Agents of this on 30 April 1859, who then commissioned the British printing company De La Rue to engrave a die for the new stamp.

The stamp depicts a portrait of Queen Victoria wearing a diadem, set on an octagonal shield surrounded by olive leaves. The die was engraved by Jean Ferdinand Joubert de la Ferté, and die proofs were ready by 21 June. Specimen stamps were sent to Malta later on in the year, and they were approved by the government. The initial printing consisted of 100 sheets of 240 stamps each, and it was sent to Malta on 21 July 1859.

The introduction of the stamp was announced in a Government notice dated 16 November 1860, and it was issued on 1 December so as to coincide with the start of the financial year. The stamp paid the local letter rate of ½d per half ounce (14g), and it had no validity on mail addressed to foreign destinations, which continued to be franked with British stamps. The new stamp was sold from the General Post Office at Valletta, police stations and some stationers. The earliest known use of the stamp is a letter dated 13 December 1860 which was sent by Giorgio Grognet de Vassé in Valletta to Giuseppe Said in Mosta. This particular letter sold for £5800 at an auction in December 2009.

== Printings and technical details ==
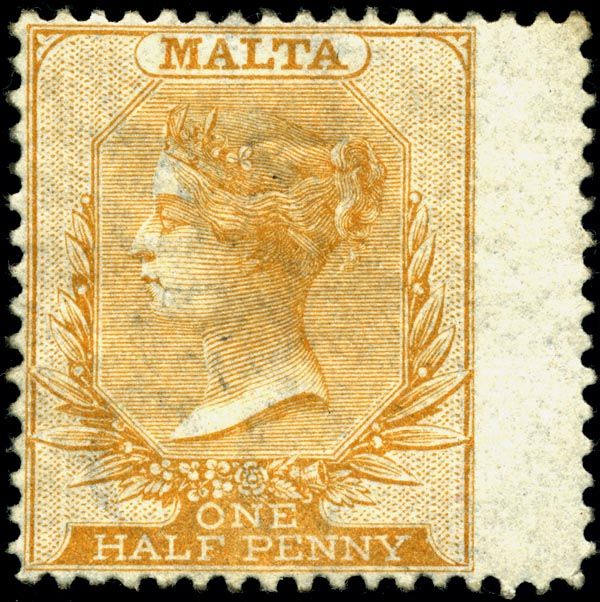
A wing marginal stamp from the 1863 printing

The initial printing which was issued on 1 December 1860 consisted of stamps in a buff colour which were printed on blued unwatermarked paper. Between 1861 and 1884, 28 reprints of the stamp were made in a variety of different colour shades, on paper with a different watermark, and with differing perforations. The first few printings were on unwatermarked paper, while stamps printed between 1863 and 1881 had a Crown CC watermark. The last few printings which were made between 1882 and 1884 had a Crown CA watermark. These watermarks consisted of the letters "CC" or "CA" (both referring to the Crown Agents for the Colonies) beneath a representation of a crown. Varieties of some stamps also exist in which the watermarks are inverted or reversed.

Most of the Halfpenny Yellow stamps were perforated with a gauge of 14, but printings in 1868 and 1870 had a gauge 12½ which was rough in the former and clean-cut in the latter. Another two printings in 1878 and 1879 had a perforation of 14 x 12½. Prior to 1878, the gutter between the panes of stamps in the sheet was perforated centrally, resulting in the stamps along the gutter having a large wing margin. After 1878, the configuration of the perforator was changed such that wing marginal stamps were no longer produced.

In 1883, plans were being made to transfer control of Malta's postal services to the colonial government, and it was therefore proposed that the colour of the halfpenny stamp be changed from yellow to green in accordance with Universal Postal Union guidelines. In addition, new denominations of stamps would be needed to cater for postal rates to foreign destinations. A printing of ½d stamps in green was made in 1883 but was not issued immediately, while a final printing of the ½d yellow was made in 1884. The transfer of control took place on 1 January 1885 when the Malta Post Office was established. At this point, a new definitive set of six stamps including the ½d green which had been printed in 1883 was introduced, replacing both the Halfpenny Yellows and the British stamps used in Malta.

== Collecting ==
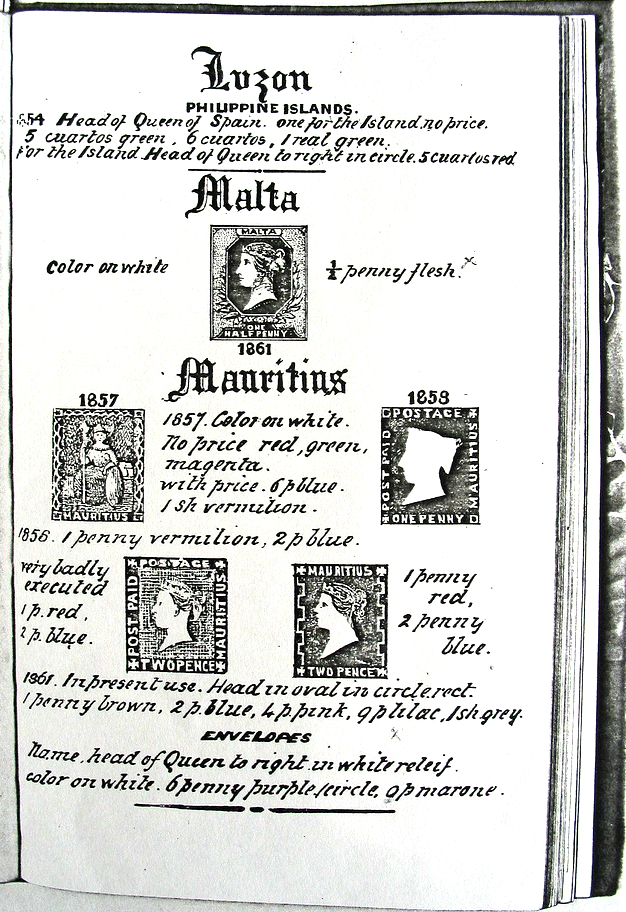
An 1862 stamp catalogue by Frederick Booty illustrating the Halfpenny Yellow along with some stamps from Mauritius

When the Halfpenny Yellow was first issued in 1860, stamp collecting was emerging as a popular new hobby in Europe. In some early philatelic literature, the stamp's issue date was incorrectly identified as 1861. There were a number of stamp collectors in Malta by the mid-1860s and early philatelists (then called timbrophilists) began to identify variations in the different printings. Some versions of the stamp such as that on bluish paper quickly became sought after, particularly by French collectors.

In contemporary philatelic literature, some printings of the stamp were praised while others were poorly received. In a November 1866 article in The Stamp Collector's Magazine, an anonymous Maltese collector (Note: The author of the magazine article is simply identified as J. S.) identified stamps from an 1864 printing in orange as "the best that have as yet been circulated in the island, their bright colour bringing out the beauties of the engraving", but criticized a subsequent printing in buff as being "the ugliest stamp of the British colonies". In an earlier edition of the magazine from August 1866, the same anonymous author had lamented that Malta only used local halfpenny stamps while other British colonies had stamps for international mail. In a letter to the editor, the collector proposed that the islands should issue stamps featuring local symbols such as the Maltese cross which were absent from the Halfpenny Yellow.

The Halfpenny Yellow stamps are highly sought after by stamp collectors, and their value varies considerably depending on the scarcity of the particular version of the stamp. As of 2023, the catalogue prices of a mint Halfpenny Yellow range from £20 to £1400 in the Stanley Gibbons catalogue, while those of a used stamp range between £40 and £650 (excluding errors such as inverted or reversed watermarks which are sometimes worth more). The earliest printings of 1860–1863 on unwatermarked paper are among the most expensive, while the latest printings of 1882–1884 with the Crown CA watermark are the cheapest.

A number of forgeries of Halfpenny Yellow stamps exist, most notably by Jean de Sperati.

== Legacy ==
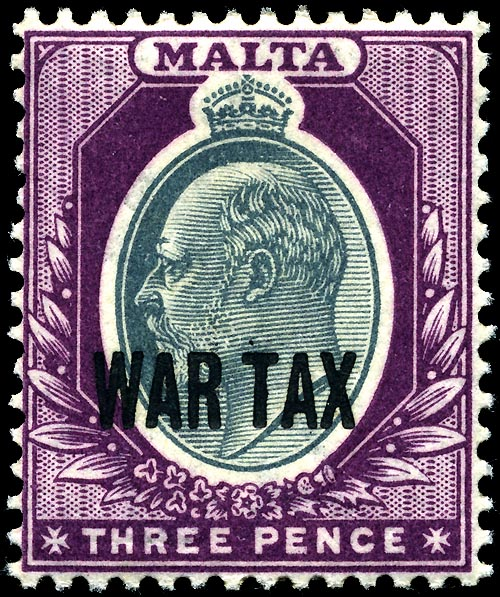
Malta stamp depicting Edward VII within the frame of the Halfpenny Yellow

The ½d green which replaced the Halfpenny Yellows was in regular use from 1885 to 1903, and due to its long period of use it is a very common stamp. In 1899, this stamp was also issued with overprints for revenue purposes. After Queen Victoria died and was succeeded by King Edward VII, the new stamps which depicted the king had designs which were based on the Halfpenny Yellow. Between 1903 and 1911, various stamps with denominations ranging from ½d to 5/- were issued which featured the king's portrait set within the octagonal frame of the 1860 stamp. Some of these were also issued with revenue overprints between 1904 and 1912, and one was issued with a war tax overprint in 1918.

On 1 December 1960, Malta issued a set of three stamps on stamps depicting the Halfpenny Yellow along with Queen Elizabeth II to commemorate the centenary of the stamp's issue. The stamp is also depicted on Malta's first postal card, which was issued on 6 May 1980 on the occasion of the London 1980 International Stamp Exhibition.

The Maltex 2010 philatelic exhibition, which was held by the Malta Philatelic Society at the Hotel Phoenicia between 8 and 10 October 2010, was dedicated to the Halfpenny Yellow to coincide with the stamp's 150th anniversary. The exhibition included a number of displays which focused on the stamp and souvenirs which depicted it were also produced. On 1 December, MaltaPost commemorated the anniversary by issuing a miniature sheet depicting the earliest recorded cover with the Halfpenny Yellow as a stamp on stamp. For the occasion, the company also held an exhibition and talks about Maltese postal history at the National Library of Malta between 2 December 2010 and 8 January 2011. The 1860 stamp was also depicted on the cover of the year pack which contained all the stamps issued by MaltaPost during 2010.

== See also ==
- Postage stamps and postal history of Malta
