= Ferdinand Joubert =

French artist

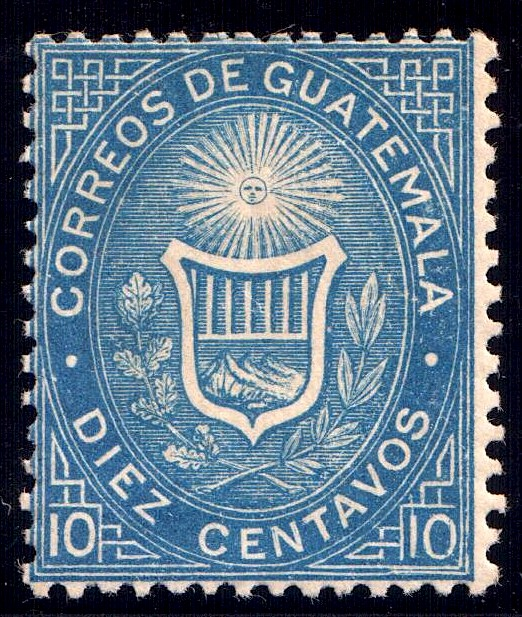
An 1871 stamp of Guatemala, engraved by Joubert.

Jean Ferdinand Joubert de la Ferté (15 September 1810 – 17 November 1884) was a French engraver, photographer and inventor who developed new photographic techniques and engraved dies for numerous notable postage stamps while working for De La Rue in London. His engravings were used to produce stamps of the United Kingdom, the Confederate States of America, Belgium, Italy and several British colonies including British Columbia and Vancouver Island, Ceylon, Hong Kong, India, Jamaica, Malta (the Halfpenny Yellow), Mauritius and New South Wales.

== Life ==
Joubert was born in Paris on 15 September 1810. He was a student of Henriquel-Dupont in 1829. Joubert married Francis Emelia in 1842. He died at Menton in 1884.
