= Postage stamps and postal history of Malta =

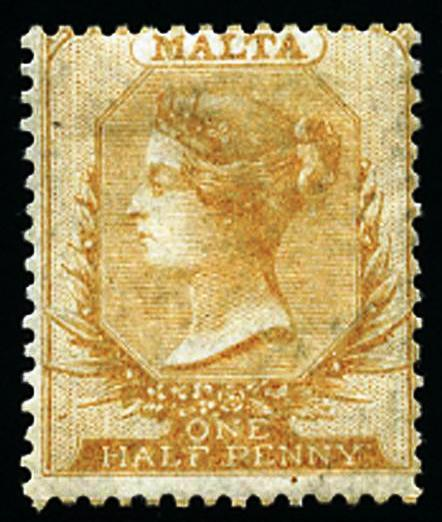
Malta's first postage stamp, the Halfpenny Yellow, which was issued for local mail on 1 December 1860

The postal history of Malta began in the early modern period, when pre-adhesive mail was delivered to foreign destinations by privately owned ships for a fee. The earliest known letter from Malta, sent during the rule of the Order of St John, is dated 1532. The first formal postal service on the islands was established by the Order in 1708, with the post office being located at the Casa del Commun Tesoro in Valletta. The first postal markings on mail appeared later on in the 18th century.

The postal service was reformed in 1798 during the French occupation of Malta, and the islands were taken over by the British in 1800. In the early 19th century, two separate post offices were established in Malta: the Island Post Office and the Packet Office, with the latter forming part of the British Post Office. Their operations were amalgamated in 1849, and British postage stamps began to be used in Malta in August 1857. Malta's first postage stamp—the Halfpenny Yellow—was issued in 1860 for use on local mail, while letters sent to foreign destinations continued to be franked with British stamps.

In 1885, the Malta Post Office was set up and Halfpenny Yellows and British stamps were no longer valid in Malta. A set of six definitive stamps along with several types of postal stationery were issued. Malta continued to issue stamps and stationery throughout the 19th, 20th and 21st centuries. At some points from the 1880s to the 1980s, postage stamps or dual-purpose postage and revenue stamps were also valid for fiscal use, but at times separate revenue stamps were issued. Postage due stamps were issued between 1925 and the 1990s.

In 1995, the private limited company Posta Limited was set up to run the postal service. The public limited company MaltaPost took over in 1998, and was gradually privatized between 2002 and 2008.

== Postal history ==
=== Hospitaller rule and French occupation (1530–1800) ===
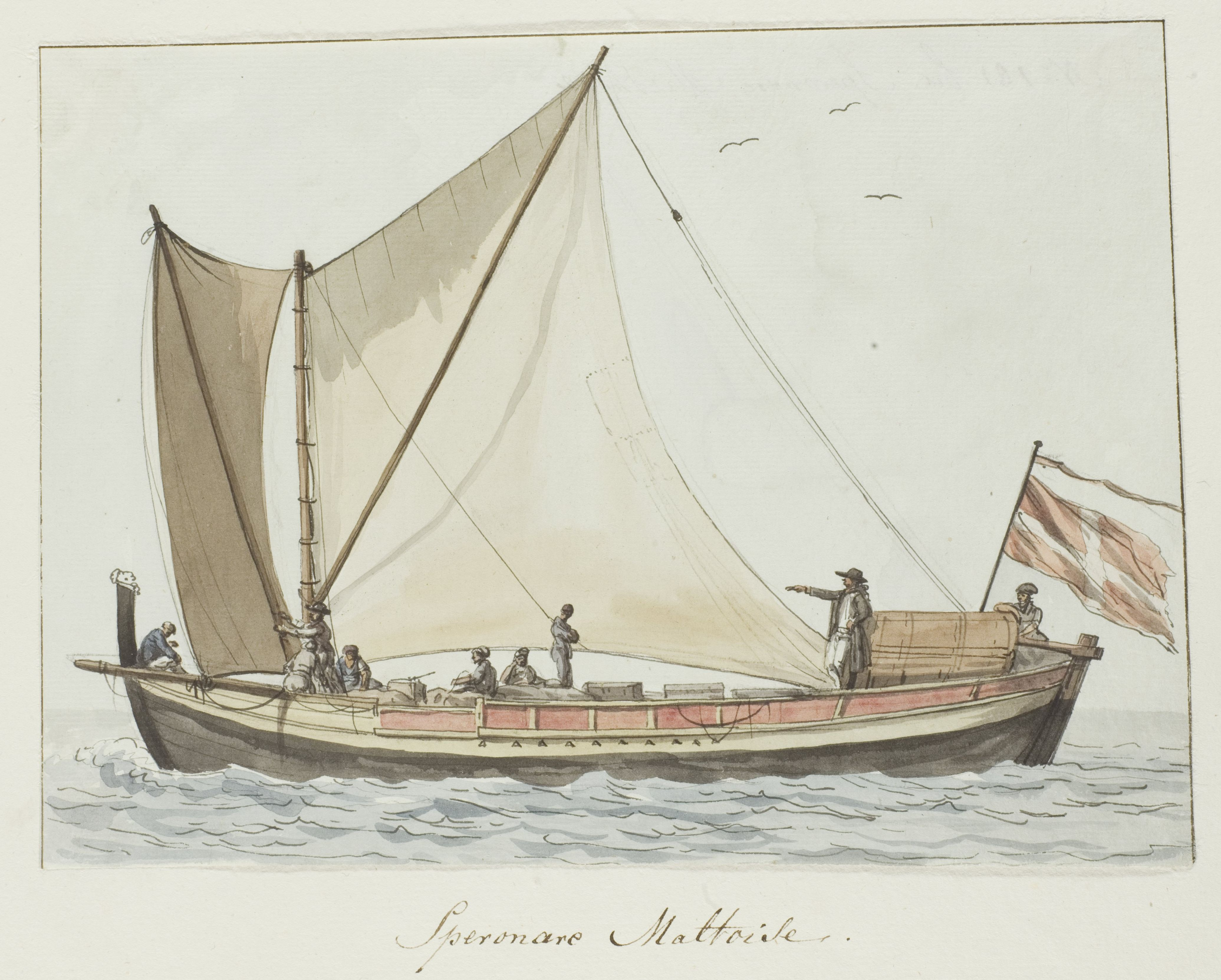
A speronara, a small vessel which carried people, mail and other cargo between Malta and Sicily

The earliest known information about mail in Malta is from when the islands were under Hospitaller rule. It is believed that prior to the Order's arrival in Malta in 1530, correspondence between Malta and Sicily was carried on private vessels such as speronaras for a fee. The earliest known letter from Malta is dated 14 June 1532; Grand Master Philippe Villiers de L'Isle-Adam sent it to François II de Dinteville, the Bishop of Auxerre, who was also the French ambassador in Rome. After the plague epidemic of 1675–1676, mail was disinfected at the Barriera in the capital Valletta. At the time it was feared that paper could carry the disease.

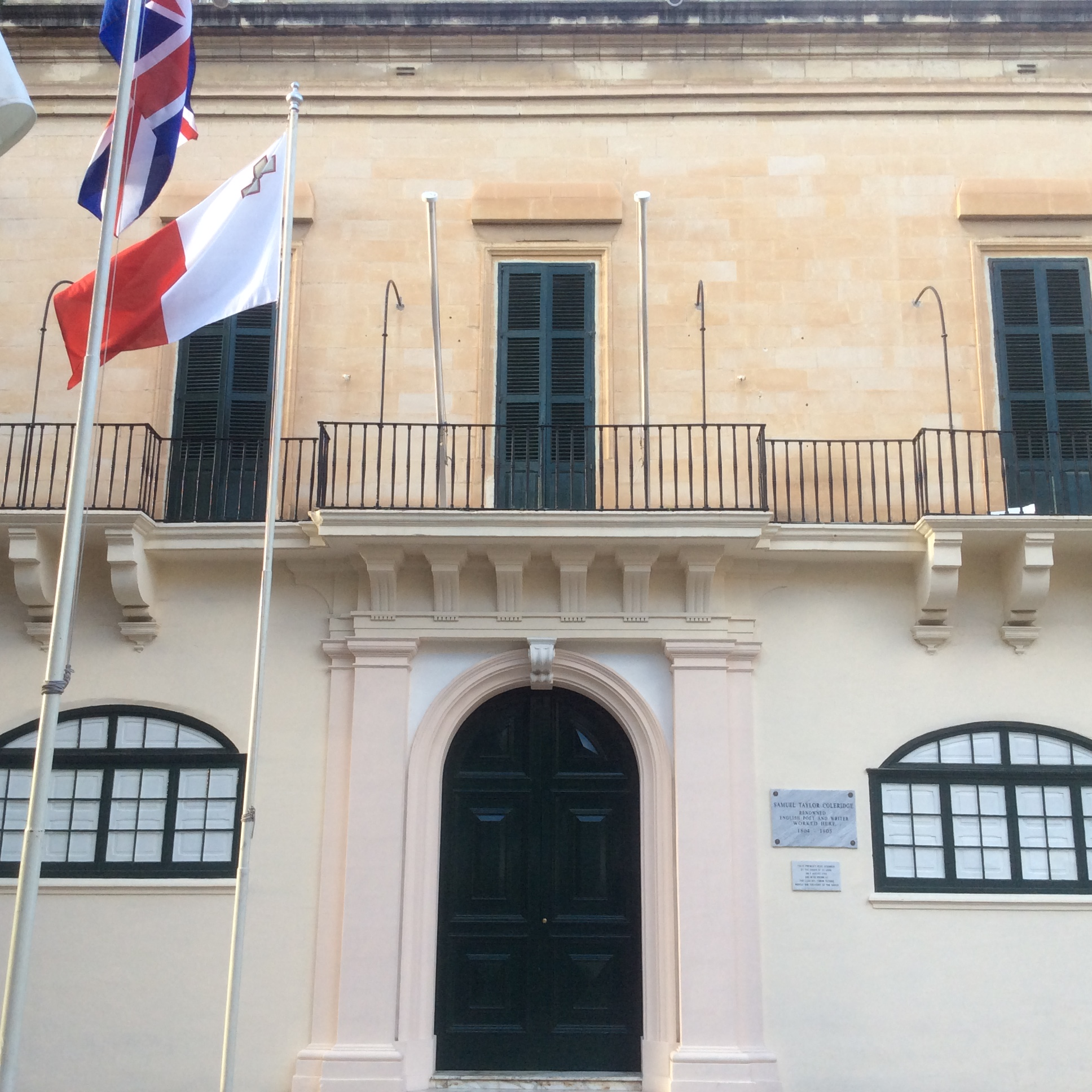
The Casa del Commun Tesoro in Valletta, which housed the first post office in Malta between 1708 and 1849

In 1708, Grand Master Ramón Perellós established the Commissary of Posts, which was Malta's first proper postal service. A post office was established within the Casa del Commun Tesoro in Valletta. At this point, fixed tariffs based on weight, the number of sheets and the destination of a letter were introduced. The first postal markings on Maltese mail appeared sometime in the second half of the 18th century. (Note: According to a 2008 article about the postal history of Malta in the Times of Malta, the first postal markings appeared sometime between 1755 and 1791. This is also confirmed by the Malta Postal Museum.)

During Hospitaller rule, most correspondence sent to or from Malta was with the Italian states and France. There was also mail sent to and from Greece and Spain, but this was not as frequent.

On 18 June 1798, shortly after the successful French invasion of Malta, Napoleon issued an article which was meant to reorganise Malta's postal system such that postal charges covered the expenses of running the postal service. At this point, a handstamp reading Malte was introduced. The text in this postal marking is set within an irregular shape resembling a loaf, and it is therefore commonly nicknamed as the "Loaf of Bread" handstamp.

=== Early British rule (1799–1884) ===
After a few months of French occupation, a rebellion broke out and the British, Portuguese and Neapolitans assisted the Maltese rebels. On 7 October 1799 Alexander Ball, the British Civil Commissioner of Malta, issued a notice which set up a mail delivery service in the rebel-held parts of Malta. Some rooms in San Anton Palace were used as a post office, and mail was sent to Sicily every week. After Malta had become a British protectorate in 1800, the Island Post Office was established as a government department handling inland mail and ship letters, and it continued to be housed at the Casa del Commun Tesoro. The Chief Secretariat's Office took responsibility of the Post Office in 1815. Starting from 1819, the Island Post Office used various handstamps reading Malta P Paid, Malta Post Paid or Malta Post Office on mail.

On 3 July 1806, the Packet Office was established in order to create a regular mail service between Britain and Malta. This was part of the British Post Office, and it was a separate entity from the Island Post Office. The Packet Office was initially also housed in the Casa del Commun Tesoro, but in separate rooms from the Island Post Office. Private vessels known as packet boats were contracted to carry mail from Falmouth, Cornwall to Malta via Gibraltar. The first such journey was made by the vessel Cornwallis, which left Falmouth on 19 July 1806 and arrived in Malta on 20 August. The Packet Agent in Malta introduced its own handstamps on mail (reading Malta) in early 1807. The Falmouth–Gibraltar–Malta packet boat service was extended to Corfu in 1819, and further packet boat links were introduced to Messina in 1824 and Genoa in 1826. In the early 19th century, mail to destinations such as Sicily or Mahón, Menorca could also be sent via merchant or naval ships.

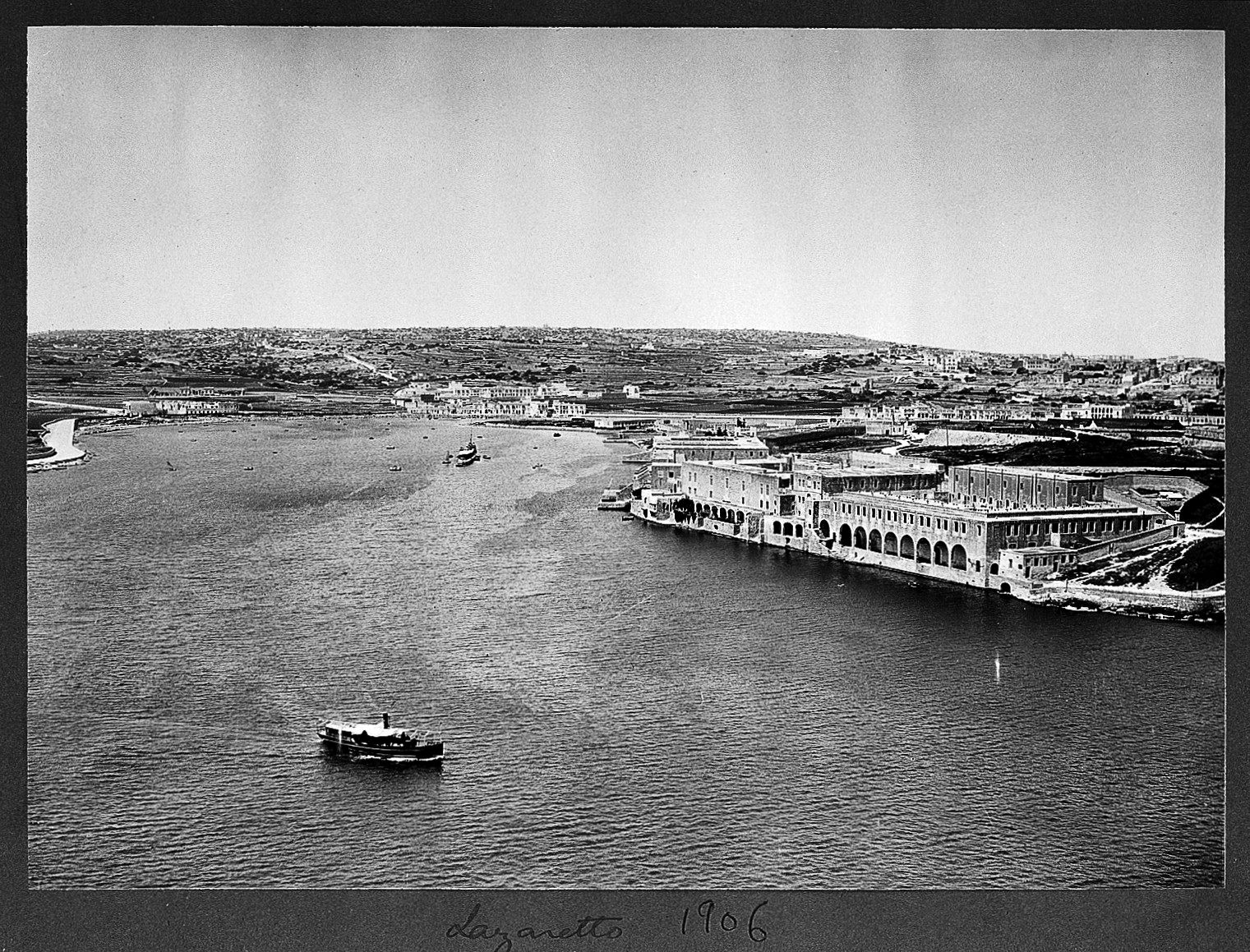
The Lazzaretto of Manoel Island, where mail was disinfected in the 19th and early 20th centuries

Throughout the 19th century, mail was disinfected by slitting letters open and soaking them in vinegar or exposing them to fumes of a mixture of substances. By 1812, this was carried out at the Profumo Office of the Lazzaretto. During the plague epidemic of 1813, the local postal service continued to function and it was the only means of communication between people in areas where movement was restricted. Disinfected mail began to be marked with wax seals starting from around 1816, and later with handstamps from around 1837. Disinfection of mail on a large scale ceased in the 1880s, but it was carried out in rare cases until at least 1936.

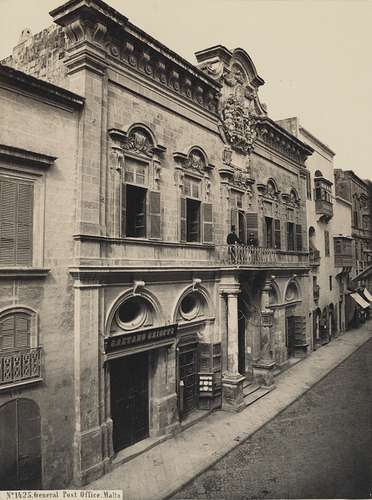
The Banca Giuratale in Valletta, which housed the Packet Office and later the General Post Office between 1842 and 1886

In 1842, the Packet Office moved to the Banca Giuratale, and in March 1849 the Island Post Office also moved to this building, which came to be known as the General Post Office. On 1 April 1849, a Postmaster became responsible for both offices, and their operations were combined although they officially remained separate until 1884. On 10 June 1853, an experimental free daily postal service for letters and newspapers was introduced between Valletta, the Three Cities, Gozo and some of the larger towns. Prepayment of postage became compulsory on 1 March 1858, shortly after British postage stamps had been introduced in Malta.

In 1859, it was decided that a Malta postage stamp would be issued for local mail, and the Halfpenny Yellow was subsequently issued on 1 December 1860. At this point, daily delivery was introduced in Valletta, Floriana and Sliema, and letter boxes were introduced in Valletta. The new stamp was only valid locally, and mail addressed to foreign destinations continued to be franked with British stamps. The United Kingdom joined the General Postal Union (later known as the Universal Postal Union, UPU) on 1 July 1875, and since at the time the postal services in Malta were deemed to be part of the British Post Office, the islands were effectively also part of the union. Malta claims to have been the first British colony to join the UPU, although due to its status as a colony it did not gain full membership until independence almost a century later.

=== Malta Post Office (1885–1995) ===
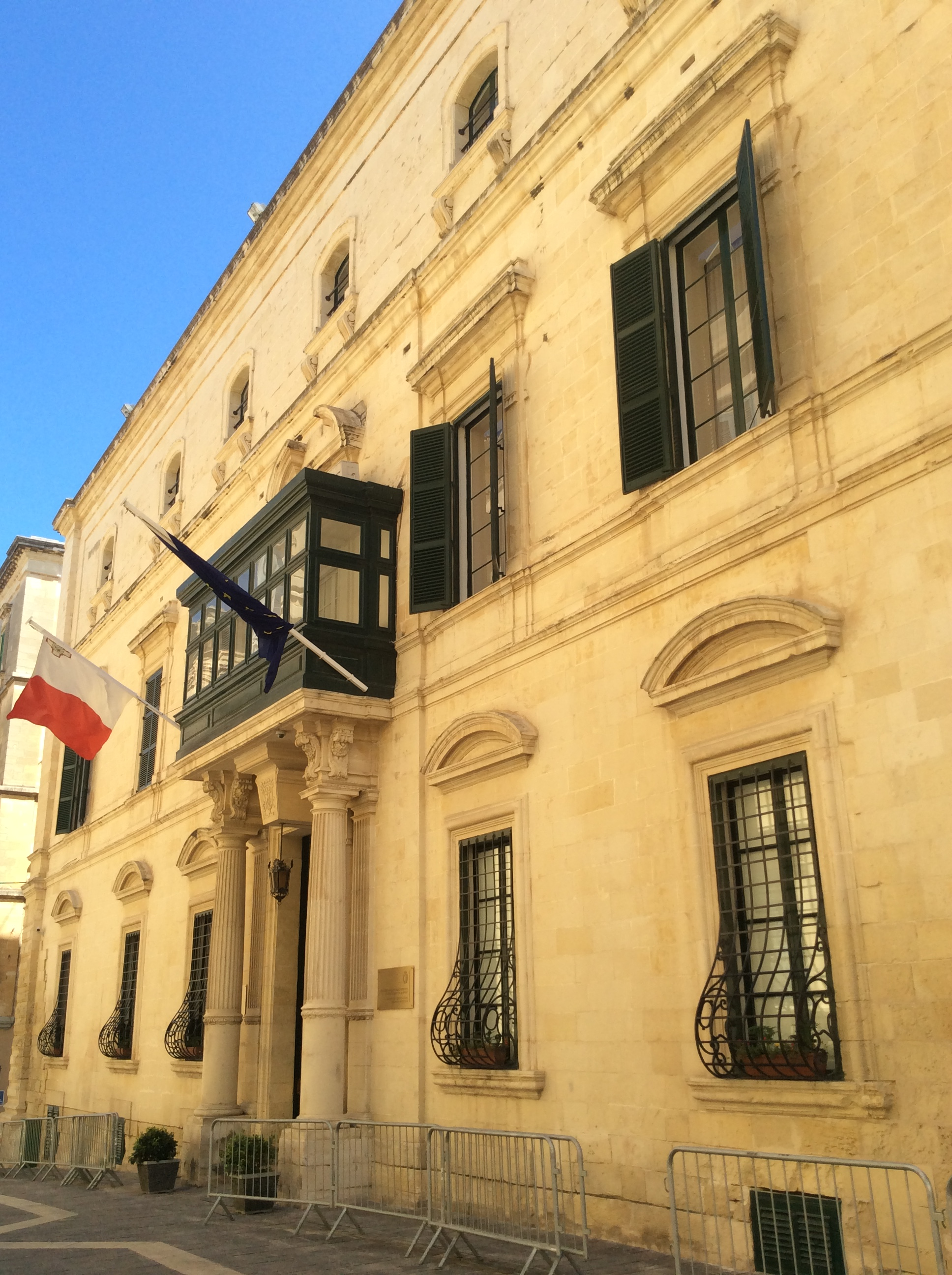
Palazzo Parisio in Valletta, which housed the General Post Office between 1886 and 1973 (except for a brief period during World War II)

In 1879, Governor Arthur Borton made a proposal to transfer control of postal services to the Government of Malta. This occurred on 1 January 1885, when the Island Post Office and the Packet Office were officially merged into a single Post Office. At this point, the Halfpenny Yellows and British stamps were withdrawn and new Malta stamps and postal stationery were issued to replace them. On 17 May 1886, the General Post Office moved from the Banca Giuratale to Palazzo Parisio, also in Valletta. From 14 August 1889, letter carriers were given a numbered handstamp which they would apply to the mail that they were delivering. This created accountability since it made it easy to identify the postman responsible in the case of misdelivered mail. These markings, which are known as postmen's personal handstamps (Italian: bollo personale), remained in use until 1949.

By around 1891, police stations in various villages had begun to sell postage stamps. The postal system was reorganised in 1894, and this included the establishment of postal districts. Circular postmarks for various towns and villages were introduced in 1900, but most were withdrawn in 1921. Some of the larger post offices such as those at Cospicua, Notabile, Sliema and Victoria, Gozo retained their postmarks.

Postal services in Malta were disrupted during World War II, and postal censorship was introduced at this point. Malta was heavily bombarded during the war, and several post offices were destroyed or damaged due to aerial bombardment. The Cospicua post office was hit in June 1940, and its staff and equipment were relocated to a temporary post office in Paola, which was itself bombed on 12 February 1942. It was relocated once again to Żejtun where it remained until 1946. Palazzo Parisio was bombed on 24 April 1942 and the GPO temporarily moved elsewhere in Valletta until returning to its former location on 16 January 1943. During this period, some of the GPO services were transferred to the primary school of Ħamrun.

Demand for postal services increased drastically after the war, and many new post offices were established in towns and villages between the 1950s and the 1980s. The first postage meter was installed in Malta in 1961. Malta became independent in 1964, and the country was accepted into the UPU on 21 May 1965.

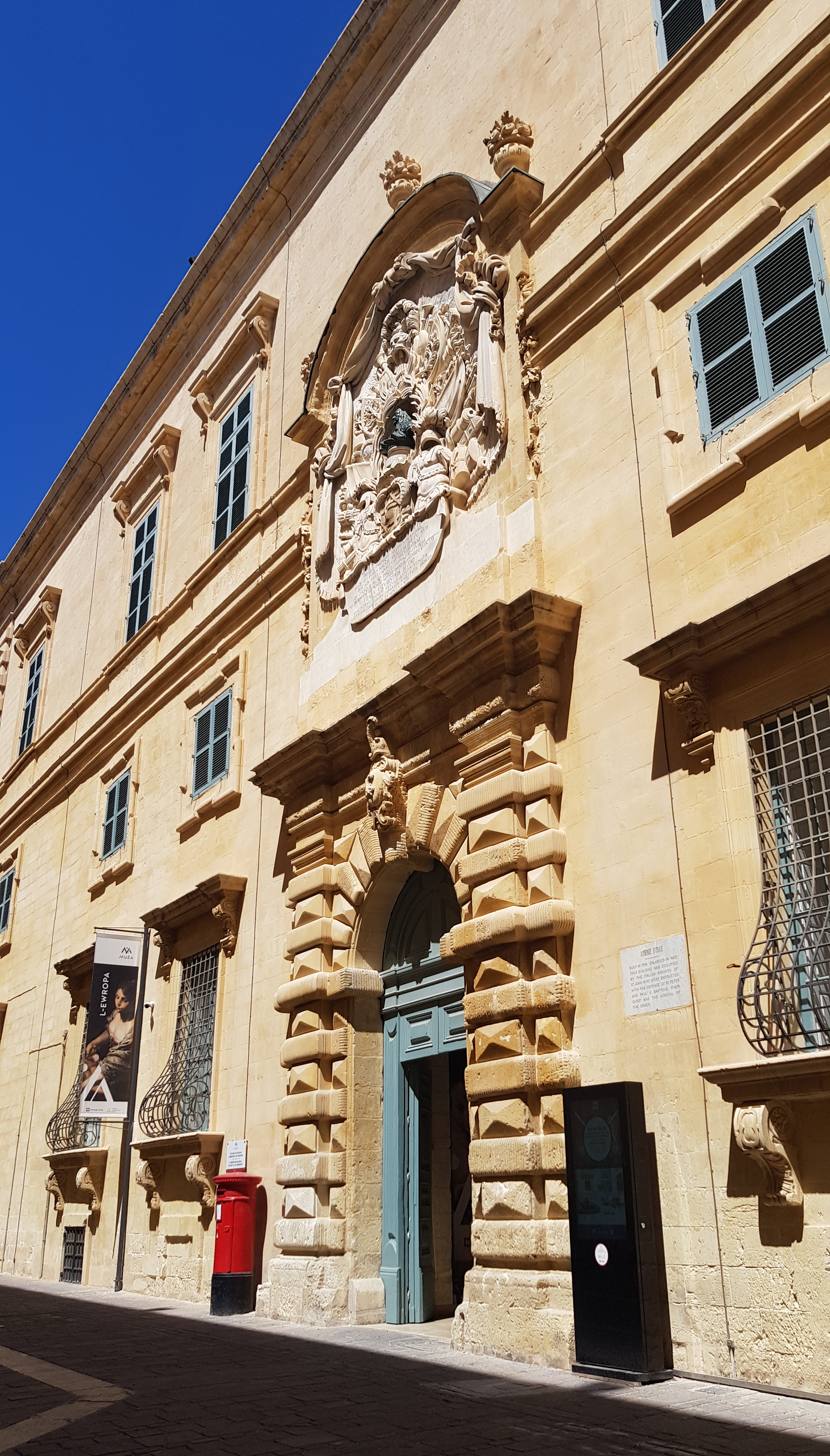
Auberge d'Italie in Valletta, which housed the General Post Office between 1973 and 1997

The Parcel Post Office moved to a new building in Victory Square in Valletta on 12 November 1963. Palazzo Parisio remained in use by the postal authorities until 4 July 1973, when the GPO moved across the street to Auberge d'Italie and the Central Mail Room, the registered letter branch and the Poste Restante moved to the former Garrison Chapel (a building now housing the Malta Stock Exchange). While it was the GPO, parts of Auberge d'Italie also housed other government departments.

Following the murder of Karin Grech by a letter bomb in 1977, mail addressed to people who were perceived to be at risk of a similar attack was checked for explosives. Once an item was certified as harmless, a marking with the letter X was applied to it before being delivered to the recipient. Such markings are known as "Karin Grech crosses" by philatelists.

Alphanumeric postal codes were introduced in Malta in 1991.

=== Posta Ltd (1995–1998) ===
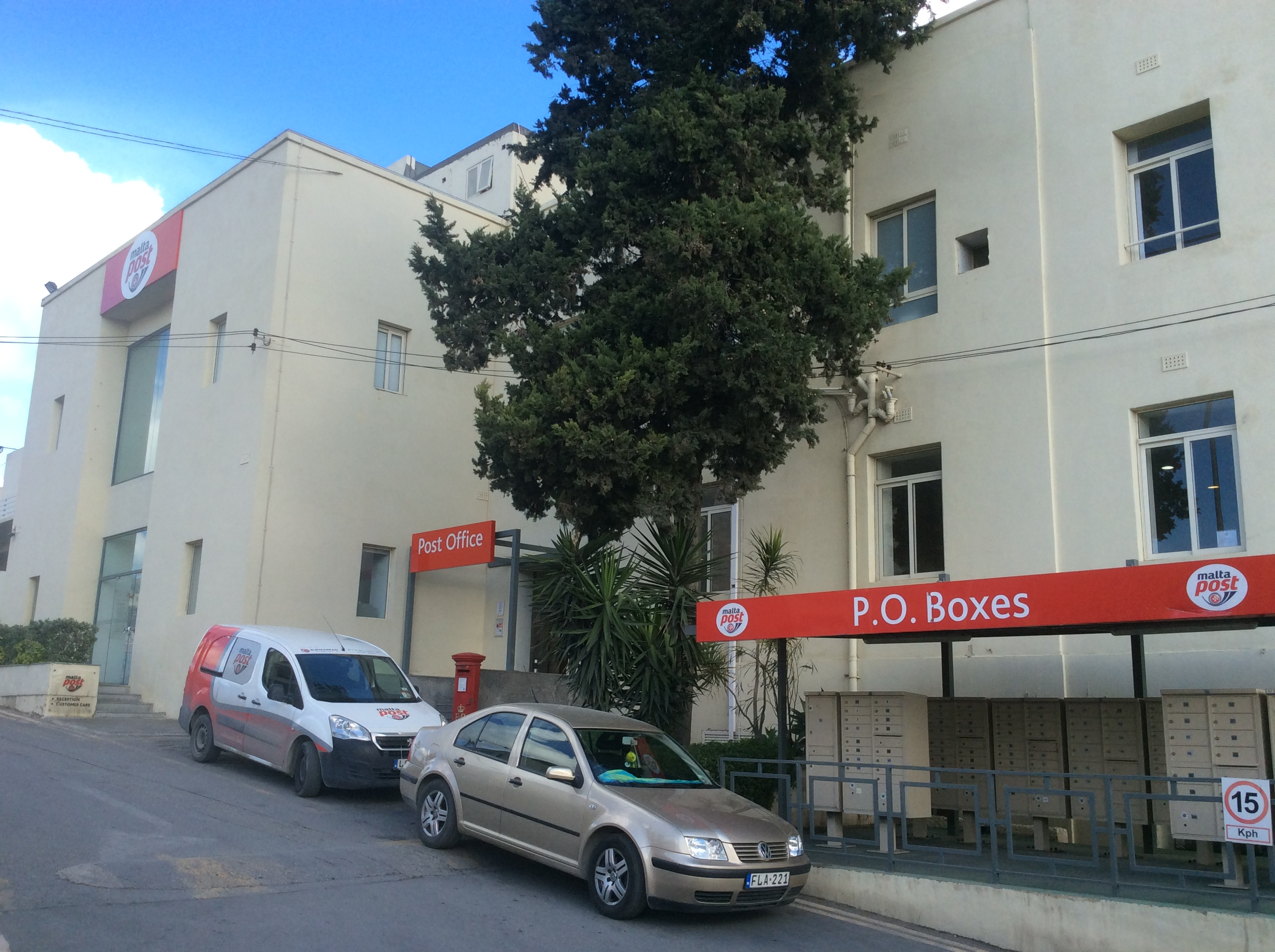
The MaltaPost Head Office at Marsa, opened by Posta Ltd in 1997

On 1 October 1995, the private limited company Posta Ltd was set up to run the General Post Office. This was done after the British Postal Consultancy Service made a recommendation in 1994 that the postal service should be run commercially. In 1996, the company made losses when sending bulk mail to Germany after the latter increased its tariffs. Posta Ltd had signed a contract with the phantom company Euromail Ltd which did not take into consideration the rate increase, and the latter profited from the former's losses.

In October 1997, the company moved to new premises at 305, Qormi Road in Marsa, and the Parcel Post Office, Central Mail Room and Philatelic Bureau were transferred there from Valletta.

=== MaltaPost (since 1998) ===
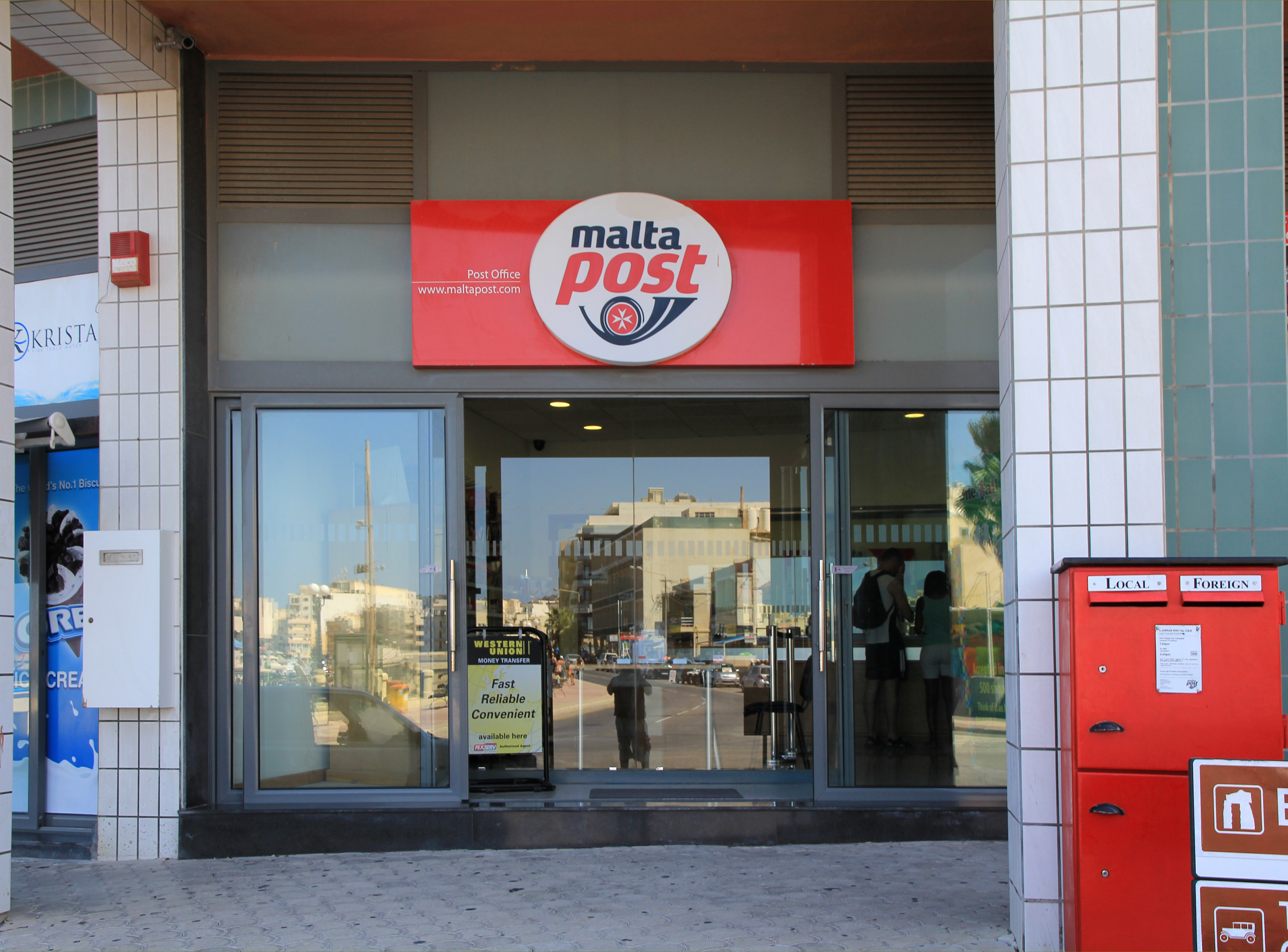
Buġibba Post Office in 2014

The public limited company MaltaPost plc was established on 16 April 1998, and it took over operations of Malta's postal service on 1 May of the same year. On 31 January 2002, MaltaPost was partially privatized when the government sold 35% to Transend Worldwide Ltd, a subsidiary company of New Zealand Post. In September 2007 the government sold 25% of its shareholding in MaltaPost to Lombard Bank, which effectively became the majority shareholder in the company with 60% shareholding. The other 40% were sold to the public in January 2008.

Malta entered the European Union (EU) in 2004, and since then there have been significant changes in the legislation which regulates Malta's postal services. The mail distribution system was also restructured, and in 2007 MaltaPost changed the country's postcodes. As required by EU legislation, the postal services sector was liberalised on 1 January 2013, allowing other entities apart from MaltaPost to provide postal services in the country. As of 2020, MaltaPost remains Malta's only Universal Service Provider of postal services. Apart from transporting mail and other standard postal activities, the company's post offices also provide services such as payments of bills and the sale of stationery.

On 17 June 2016, MaltaPost opened the Malta Postal Museum in Valletta.

== Postage stamps ==
=== Use of British stamps in Malta (1857–1884) ===
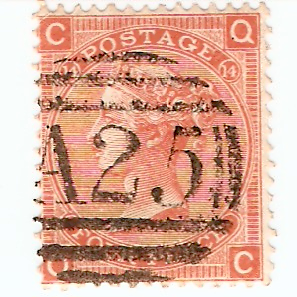
A British stamp of 1873 with a Malta A25 numeral killer postmark

Between 1855 and 1856, some mail sent by British military personnel during the Crimean War which was franked with British stamps was cancelled with a wavy lines grid postmark at Malta.

British postage stamps became available to the general public in Malta on 18 August 1857 and they remained valid until 31 December 1884. These can be identified by coded postal obliterators reading M or A25, which were introduced in 1857 and 1859 respectively. The M postmark was withdrawn by early 1861 and a number of different A25 postmarks remained in use until 1904.

Most contemporary British stamps with face values up to 10/- can be found used in Malta. These include line-engraved issues such as the Halfpenny Rose Red, Penny Red, Three Halfpence Red and Two Pence Blue, the embossed stamps and surface-printed issues such as the Penny Venetian Red, Penny Lilac and the 1883–1884 Lilac and Green issue. Some British postal fiscals also exist used in Malta.

=== Malta stamps under British rule (1860–1964) ===
Queen Victoria and King Edward VII definitives (1860–1911)

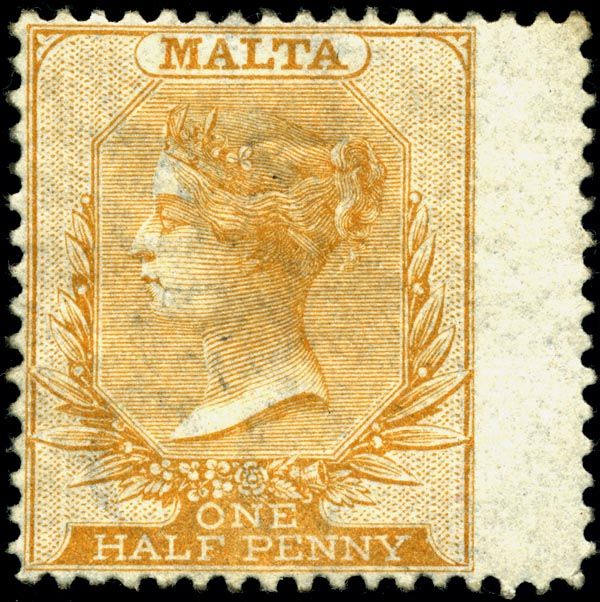
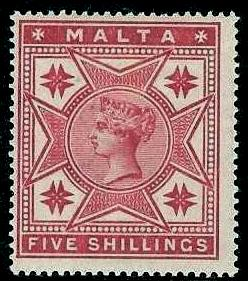
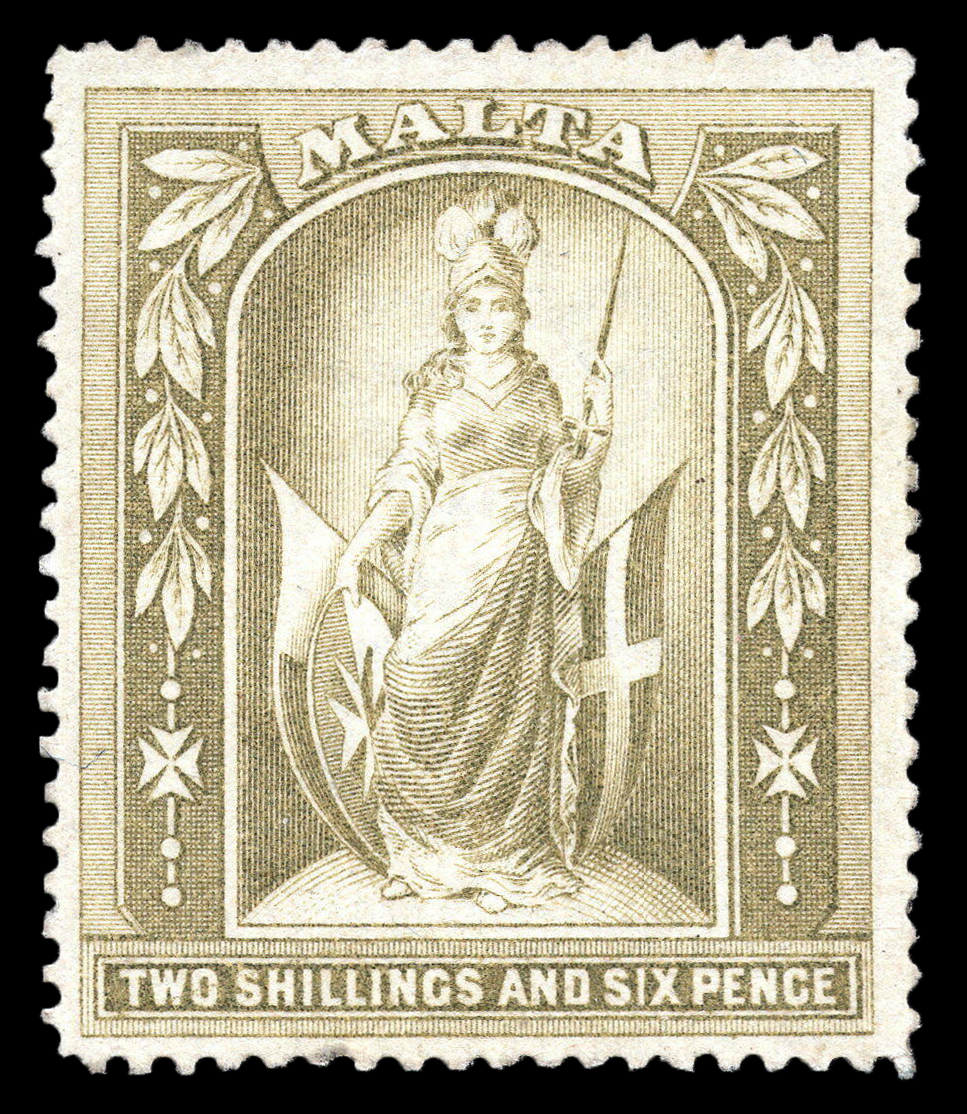
A version of the Halfpenny Yellow, issued in 1863 (left), the 5/- stamp of 1886, depicting Queen Victoria (centre) and the 2/6 stamp from the 1899 pictorial issue, depicting Melita (right)

Malta's first postage stamp, the Halfpenny Yellow, was issued on 1 December 1860. It was only valid for local letters, and British stamps had to be used for mail addressed to foreign destinations. The stamp was printed by De La Rue initially on blued unwatermarked paper. It was reprinted 29 times over the course of over two decades, resulting in stamps from the printings having differences in the colour shade, paper, watermark or perforation.

At the end of 1884, a series of definitive stamps depicting Queen Victoria was issued, and they became valid for use on 1 January 1885 when control of the postal services was fully transferred to the local colonial government. The ½d value of this issue had the design of the 1860 stamp but was printed in green, while the other stamps (with denominations of 1d, 2d, 2½d, 4d and 1/-) had designs which incorporated the Maltese cross. The colours of all six stamps were based on UPU regulations. A 5/- value in a larger format was added in 1886.

Four new definitive stamps were issued in 1899. Instead of depicting the monarch, these stamps featured: a Gozo boat (4½d), a Hospitaller galley (5d), the national personification Melita (2/6) and St Paul's Shipwreck (10/-). A ¼d value depicting the Grand Harbour was added in 1901 for the postal rate of local printed matter. In 1902, there was a shortage of 1d stamps, so stocks of the Queen Victoria 2½d stamp of 1885 were overprinted One Penny at the Government Printing Office in Valletta. One stamp in each sheet had an error such that the overprint read One Pnney. It is believed that this was produced deliberately.

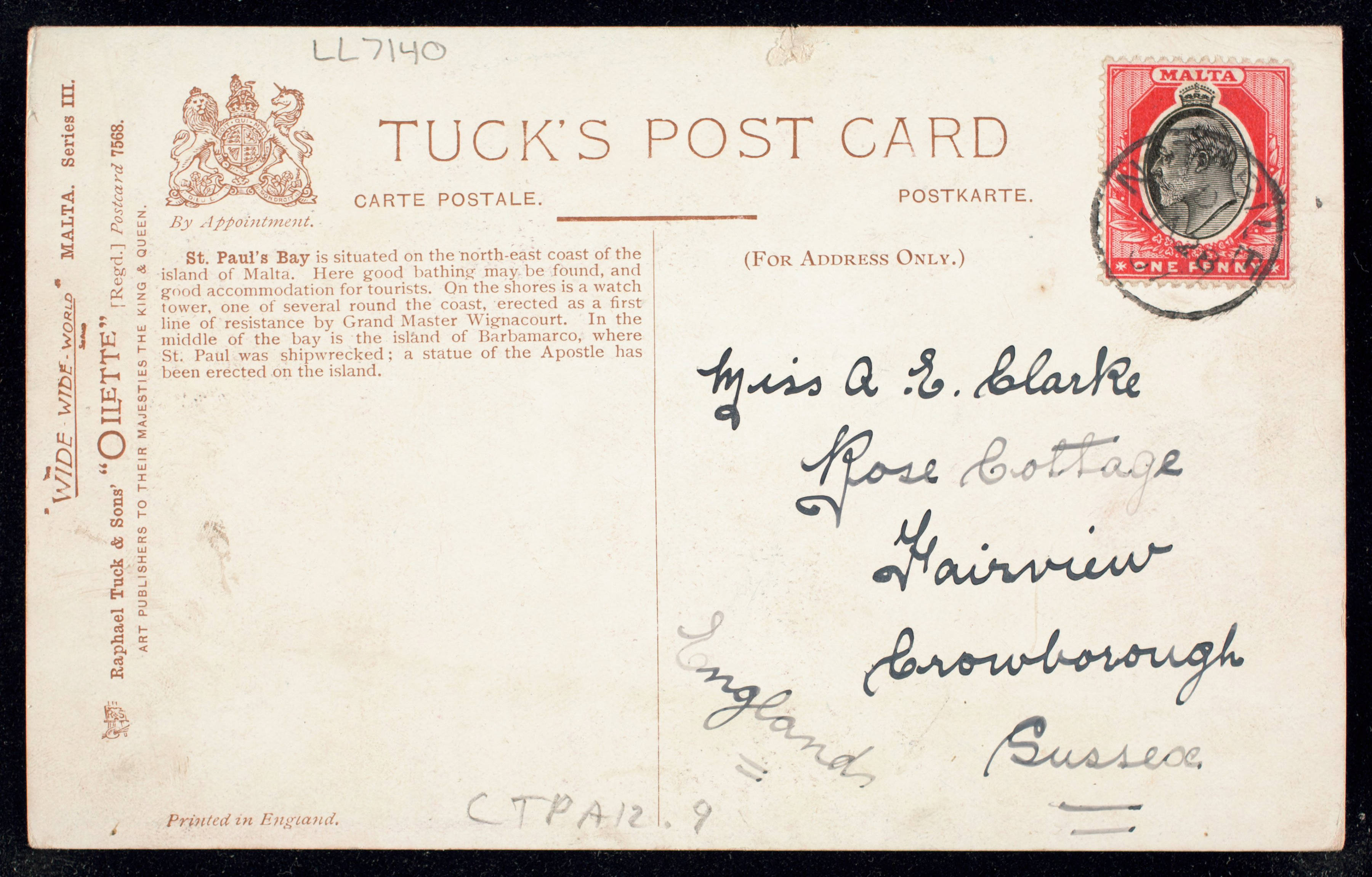
Postcard bearing a 1d Edward VII stamp postmarked at Notabile

Between 1903 and 1904, a set of seven stamps with face values between ½d and 1/- was issued. The frame of the stamps was based on the halfpenny yellow but they included the portrait of the new monarch Edward VII with a crown added on top. The 1886 5/- and the 1899–1901 pictorials remained in use. A new watermark was introduced in October 1904 and it was used on subsequent reprints of the 1899–1901 pictorials and 1903–1904 definitives. From 1907 to 1911 there were colour changes, and some bicoloured stamps were reissued in one colour. A 5/- value depicting Edward VII was issued in March 1911 replacing the 1886 issue.

King George V definitives (1914–1930)

After George V became king in 1910, new definitives which depicted his portrait were issued between 1914 and 1920. These stamps had standard keytype designs which were used in other British colonies, and they were inscribed Postage Revenue since they were equally valid for postal and fiscal use. The lower values between ¼d and 1/- had a smaller size than the 2/- and 5/- high values. A pictorial 4d value which was similar to the 1901 ¼d was also issued, and the 2/6 of 1899 was reprinted with a new watermark in 1919. That year, a 10/- value with a modified version of the 1899 St Paul's Shipwreck design was released. 1530 copies were issued, and today it is Malta's most expensive stamp.

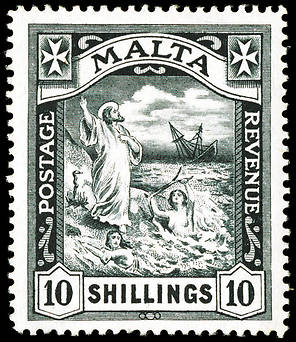
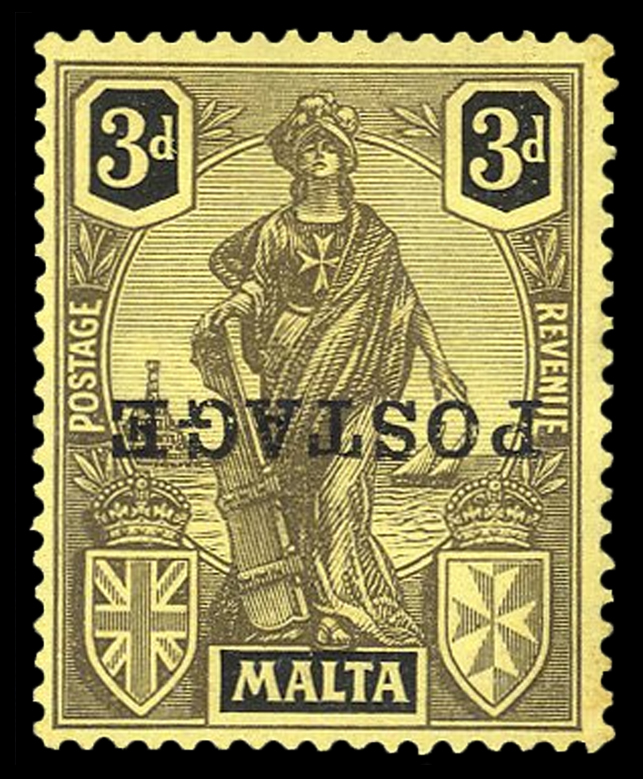
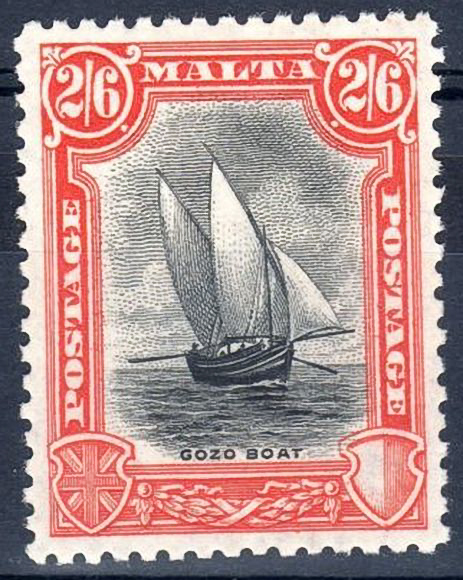
The 10/- St Paul's Shipwreck stamp of 1919 (left), the 3d stamp from the Melita issue with the 1926 Postage overprint inverted (centre) and the 2/6 value from the 1926 pictorial issue, depicting a Gozo boat (right)

Two war tax stamps with denominations of ½d and 3d were issued in 1917 and 1918, during World War I. In late 1921 and early 1922, some of the 1914–1919 issues were reprinted with a new watermark (including the 10/- value, but this is not as scarce as the 1919 issue). The 2d value of this issue had a new design. On 15 April 1922, this stamp was also issued locally surcharged One Farthing after there was a shortage of ¼d stamps.

In 1921, Malta was granted a limited form of self-government which led to the establishment of a Senate and Legislative Assembly. To commemorate this, 1899–1922 definitive stamps were locally overprinted Self-government and were issued between 12 January and 29 April 1922. Between August 1922 and 1926, a set of stamps known as the Melita issue was released, with face values between ¼d and £1. The stamps featured allegorical representations and they were designed by the Maltese artists Edward Caruana Dingli and Gianni Vella. In 1926, separate revenue stamps began to be issued again, so the Melita stamps up to 10/- were issued with a Postage overprint. Two sheets of the 3d value were discovered with the overprint inverted, and uncertainty about the error's issue led to a political scandal in 1930.

A series of postage stamps inscribed Postage was issued between 1926 and 1927. They were printed by Waterlow and Sons instead of De La Rue (which had printed all of Malta's stamps since 1860). The values of ¼d to 6d depict George V and the coat of arms of Malta, while the values of 1/- to 10/- have engraved designs. Air mail was introduced on 1 April 1928, and the 6d stamp was issued overprinted Air Mail as Malta's first airmail stamp. In 1928, it was decided that dual-purpose postage and revenue stamps would be issued again instead of having separate issues. The 1926–1927 stamps were issued with Postage and Revenue overprints in 1928, and a series of stamps with amended inscriptions was issued in 1930.

King George VI and Queen Elizabeth II definitives (1938–1964)

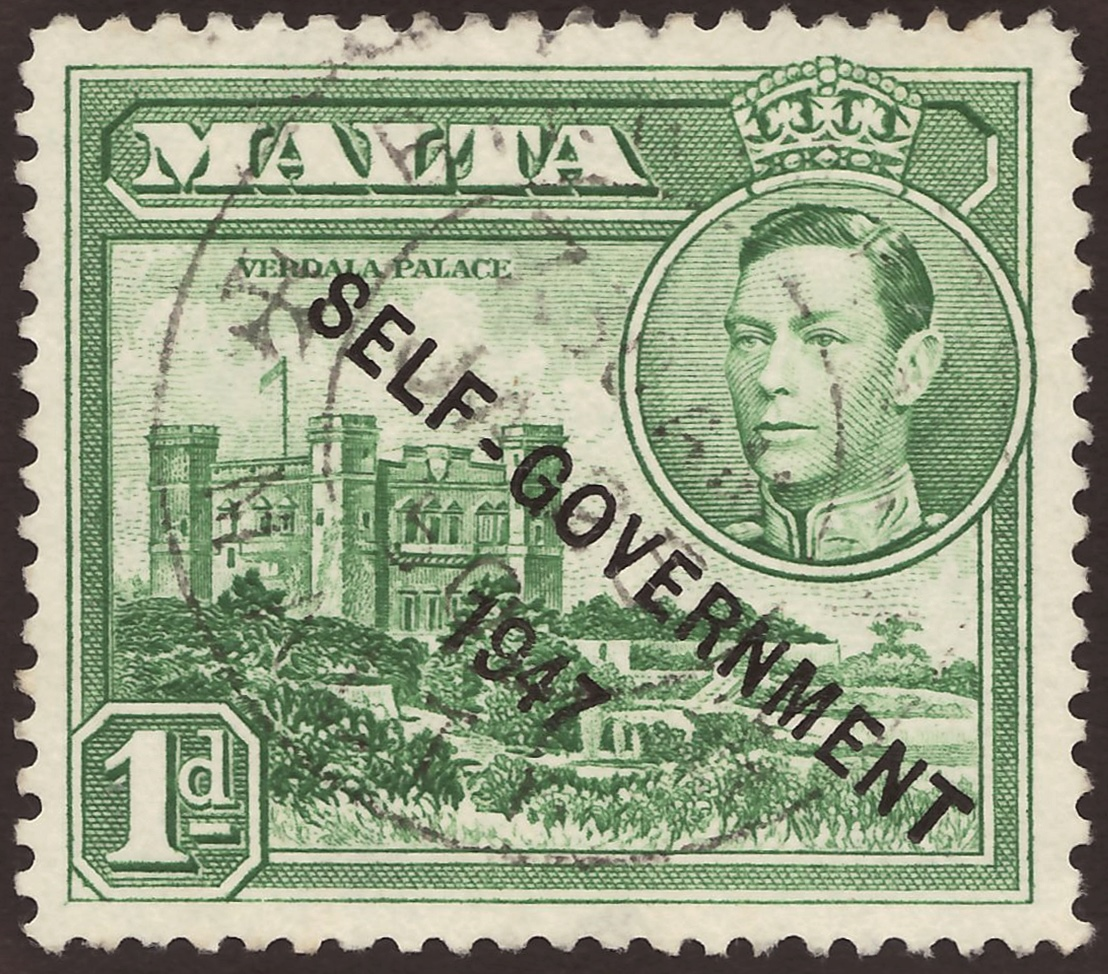
1d stamp of the George VI issue depicting the Verdala Palace, with the Self-government 1947 overprint (left) and the 1½d from the 1956 Elizabeth II definitive, depicting the War Memorial in Floriana (right)

In 1938, a definitive set of stamps with denominations between ¼d and 10/- depicting the new monarch George VI and pictorial scenes was issued. Some of the scenes were reused from the 1926–1930 definitives, whilst some values had completely new designs. The stamps were printed by Waterlow. The ¼d value was the only stamp which did not depict the monarch, but instead was based on the 1901 ¼d stamp, modernised to show how the Grand Harbour looked in the 1930s and with the GRI monogram representing the monarch. Six stamps from this set were reissued in new colours in 1943.

In 1947 Malta was granted self-government again, and in 1948 this was commemorated by overprinting the George VI definitives with the text Self-government 1947. In 1953, six stamps were reissued with colour changes, still bearing the overprint. Most of these did not exist in these colours without the overprint. A variety of the 1½d green exists in which the overprint is albino, such that it appears to be omitted. This is one of Malta's rarest postage stamp errors.

A definitive issue of stamps with denominations from ¼d to £1 depicting Queen Elizabeth II and various pictorial scenes was issued between January 1956 and January 1957. The ¼d to 2/- stamps were printed by Bradbury Wilkinson and Company, while those between 2/6 and £1 were printed by Waterlow. The stamps depicted monuments, churches and historic sites in Malta such as the Great Siege Monument, Auberge de Castille, Les Gavroches and monuments in St John's Co-Cathedral, along with scrolls presented to Malta by George VI and President Franklin D. Roosevelt during World War II. In 1963 and 1964, the 1d and 2d denominations of this issue were released with a different watermark.

Omnibus and commemorative issues (1935–1964)

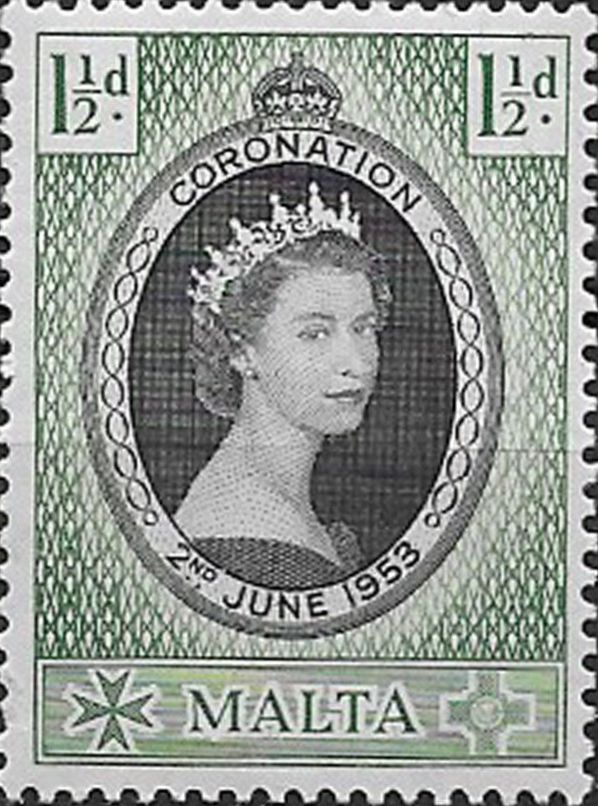
1½d omnibus issue stamp commemorating the 1953 coronation of Elizabeth II

Malta participated in all Crown Agents omnibus issues prior to independence, issuing stamps with common designs that were used in many colonies of the British Empire. Malta issued such stamps for the silver jubilee of George V (1935), the coronation of George VI (1937), victory at the end of World War II (1946), the Royal Silver Wedding (1949), the 75th anniversary of the UPU (1949), the coronation of Elizabeth II (1953), Freedom from Hunger (1963) and the Red Cross centenary (1963).

In 1950, Malta issued a set of three stamps on the occasion of the visit of Princess Elizabeth (later Elizabeth II) to Malta. Other commemorative issues followed, with issues for the 7th centenary of the Scapular in 1951, and for another royal visit by Elizabeth II and the centenary of the dogma of the Immaculate Conception both in 1954. In 1960, a set of stamps on stamps was issued for the centenary of the Halfpenny Yellow, and in 1962 a set of stamps was issued to commemorate the Great Siege of Malta of 1565.

A set of stamps commemorating the award of the George Cross to Malta was issued in 1957, designed by the Maltese artist Emvin Cremona, who would design hundreds of Malta stamps until the 1970s. Other early stamp designs by Cremona include issues commemorating technical education (1958), other issues commemorating the George Cross award (1958, 1959 and 1961), the 19th centenary of St Paul's shipwreck (1960), an Anti-Brucellosis Congress (1964) and the First European Congress of Catholic Doctors (1964); the latter was issued two weeks before Malta became independent. Most commemorative issues from the mid-1950s until independence were printed by Harrison and Sons, but a few were printed by Bradbury Wilkinson or Waterlow.

=== Independence and republic (since 1964) ===
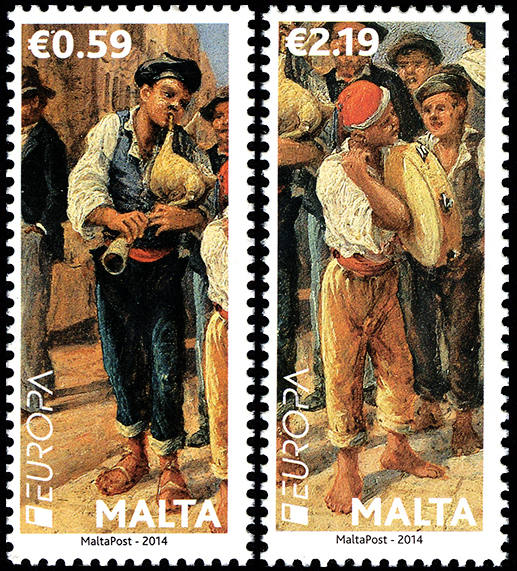
Maltese 2014 Europa stamps

Malta achieved independence as the State of Malta on 21 September 1964, and on that day a set of six stamps was issued to commemorate the event. The stamps depicted a dove representing peace along with a British crown, a Papal tiara and the United Nations emblem. A definitive set depicting scenes from Malta's history was issued in 1965, and two additional values were issued in 1970. The independence and definitive sets were designed by Cremona, as were most stamps until the 1970s. Many stamps of the mid-1960s exist with flaws or errors such as missing colours, most notably the 1965–1970 definitive. Some stamps from this definitive were also issued in postage stamp booklets in 1970 and 1971.

Malta adopted the Maltese pound or lira in 1972, and this event was commemorated by stamps showing the new coins. Some stamps of the 1965 definitive were subsequently surcharged in 1972 and 1977, and a definitive set in the new currency was issued in 1973. This set showed various scenes while the top value of £M2 was larger and depicted the country's coat of arms. Malta became a republic on 13 December 1974 and stamps commemorating this were issued in early 1975. The coat of arms was changed at this point, and a new version of the £M2 definitive was issued in 1976 to reflect this.

Other decimal currency definitives depicted the history of Maltese industry (1981), the Maltese Islands' natural and artistic heritage (1991), and flowers (1999–2006). The 1981 and 1991 definitives were each issued at one go, and in 1994 some stamps from the 1991 definitive were issued in booklets. The flowers definitives were issued in installments, and they included Malta's only self-adhesive stamps which were issued exclusively in booklets printed by Cartor Security Printers in 2003 and 2004. In 2002, postage labels which were dispensed from vending machines were also issued.

From 1964 to 1972, most stamps were printed by Harrison or De La Rue, but some were printed by the Government Printing Works in Rome, by Joh. Enschedé, by the State Printing Works in Vienna, by the Government Printer of Israel or by Format International Security Printers. Stamps were printed locally by Printex Limited from 1972 to 1999, and by Bundesdruckerei in Germany between 1999 and 2004 (except for the aforementioned booklet stamps by Cartor). Since 2004, stamps have once again been printed in Malta by Printex. All Malta stamps since independence have a watermark consisting of multiple Maltese crosses, with the exception of the 1999–2004 stamps by Bundesdruckerei or Cartor which had no watermark.

The number of commemorative or pictorial stamps issued each year increased drastically since Malta's independence. Christmas stamps have been issued annually since 1964. Between 1969 and 2001, these were semi-postal since they were sold at a premium over face value to raise money for charity. Malta issued its first miniature sheet in 1971 along with that year's Christmas stamps, and such sheets have been issued regularly since then. Malta has also issued EUROPA stamps since 1971, and since 2006 they have also been issued in stamp booklets as well as sheets.

A set of five stamps depicting films shot in Malta was meant to be issued on 27 February 2002, but due to unclear circumstances the stamps were never officially released. Despite this, some stamps ended up in collectors' hands and a set of the unissued stamps sold for £5,500 at an auction in 2018.

When Malta joined the European Union (EU) during the 2004 enlargement, a joint stamp issue was released by nine of the ten new EU members including Malta. The joint issue was prepared at MaltaPost's initiative, and the stamps issued by the nine countries had a common design by the Maltese artist Jean Pierre Mizzi. This was Malta's first joint issue, and a number of other joint issues have been released since then. Malta has issued SEPAC stamps since 2007. MaltaPost introduced personalised stamps in 2005, and continues to offer this service as of 2020.

Malta adopted the euro as its currency on 1 January 2008. Stamps issued shortly before and after the changeover (between 22 December 2006 and 28 June 2008) were denominated in both the lira and euro currencies in accordance with guidelines issued by the National Euro Changeover Committee. Pre-2006 stamps denominated only in lira remained valid for use until 31 January 2008, and they could be exchanged for euro-denominated stamps until March 2008, after which they were invalidated. The dual currency stamps issued since December 2006 remain valid for use today along with euro-denominated stamps.

A definitive set which commemorated events in Malta's history was issued in 2009, and two further stamps were added to the set in 2012 after postal rates had increased. Malta issued its largest set on 10 August 2012, when 88 stamps depicting ships which had taken part in Operation Pedestal were issued.

== Postage due stamps ==
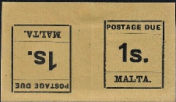
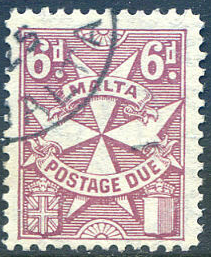
1925 postage due stamps: a pair of tête-bêche provisional stamps, issued from 16 April (left) and a stamp from the set issued from 20 July, featuring the Maltese cross (right)

Malta used postage due markings on mail throughout the 19th and early 20th centuries, but only issued its first set of postage due stamps on 16 April 1925. The first set consisted of ten imperforate provisional stamps with denominations ranging from ½d to 1/6, and they were typeset at the Government Printing Office in Valletta. The stamps had simple numeral designs, and they were printed such that tête-bêche pairs occurred within each sheet.

On 20 July 1925, a new set of postage due stamps which had been printed by Bradbury Wilkinson in Britain was issued in Malta. These had the same face values as the provisional issue, and they had a design featuring a Maltese cross and were printed in different colours. This design continued to be used until after independence, and many reprints were made resulting in the stamps existing with various different paper types, perforations, watermarks and colour shades.

Decimal currency postage due stamps inscribed Taxxa Postali (Maltese for "postal tax") were issued in 1973, and their design consisted of a numeral overlaid on a Maltese lace background. A final set of postage dues was issued in 1993, depicting a Neolithic spiral design from one of the megalithic temples found in the islands.

== Postal stationery ==
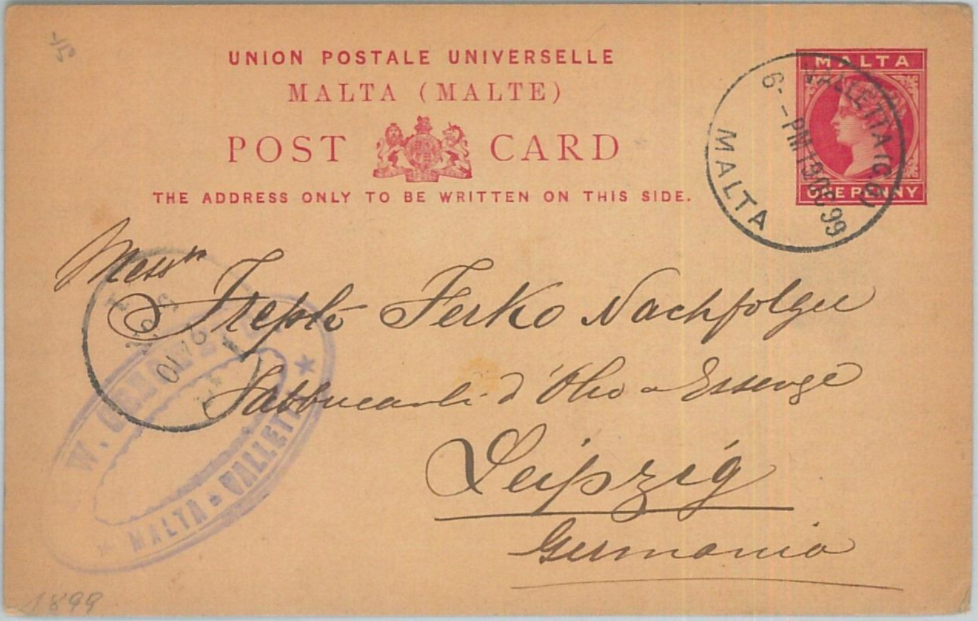
An item of Maltese postal stationery from 1899

Malta has issued postal stationery items since 1885. Postal cards (including reply cards), newspaper wrappers and registered envelopes were the first postal stationery items to be issued, concurrently with the first definitive stamps, while pre-stamped envelopes and aerogrammes were introduced later on. Most of these were discontinued at various points during the 20th century, but as of 2020 pre-stamped envelopes are still in use while pre-stamped postal cards are still issued regularly for philatelic purposes.

=== Postal cards ===
Between 1885 and 1917, various ½d and 1d postal cards were issued for local and foreign rates respectively. These cards bore an imprinted stamp which depicted the reigning monarch: initially Victoria and later Edward VII or George V. Some of the cards exist in two versions: as a single card and as a reply card (the latter consisting of two cards attached together, intended to allow recipients to send a reply without paying any postage themselves). In 1927 and 1936, postal cards which included imprinted versions of the contemporary George V postage stamps were issued, followed by cards with imprinted versions of the George VI pictorial definitives in 1938 and 1944.

Since 1980, Malta has issued postal cards for philatelic purposes. Most of them have an imprinted version of EUROPA stamps but there are a few exceptions which have actual adhesive stamps affixed instead of imprinted versions. Cards were issued almost annually for international philatelic exhibitions between 1980 and 2006, and for local philatelic exhibitions since 2007. In 1989 an additional postal card was issued to commemorate the 25th anniversary of independence, and in 2009 cards was issued for both an international and a local exhibition.

Occasion cards which usually bear an imprinted stamp have also been issued since 2001. These are similar to the philatelic postal cards, and they commemorate an event, anniversary or a philatelic exhibition.

=== Newspaper wrappers ===
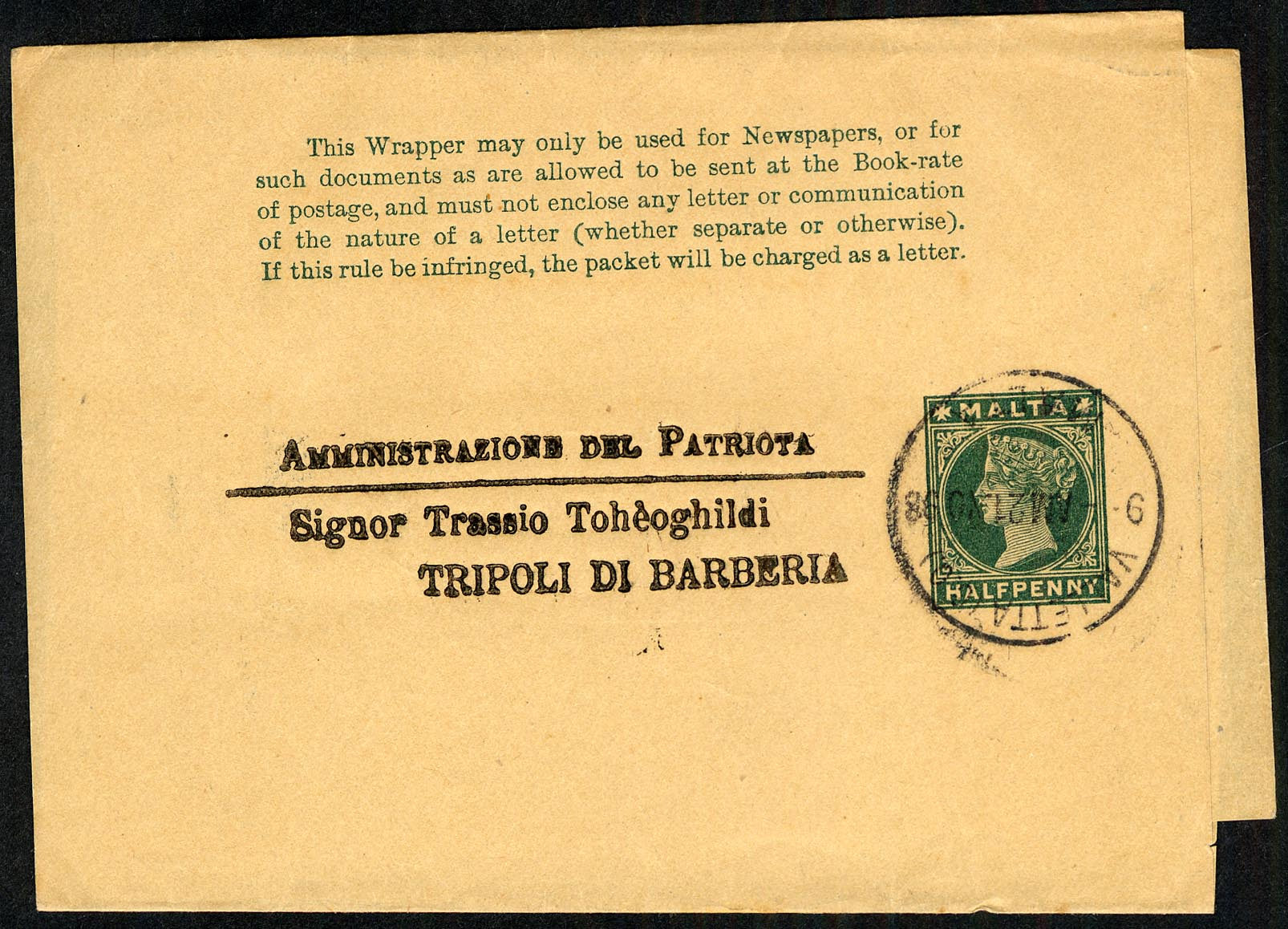
A newspaper wrapper sent from Valletta to Tripoli in 1898

Newspaper wrappers were issued between 1885 and 1913. Only three wrappers were issued, and they were all denominated ½d and depicted the reigning monarch (Victoria, Edward VII or George V).

=== Registered envelopes ===
Registered envelopes were issued between 1885 and 1995. Colonial-era envelopes came in two different sizes and they had an imprinted stamp which depicted the reigning monarch: Victoria, Edward VII, George V, George VI or Elizabeth II. This imprinted stamp only covered the registration fee, while the actual postage had to be paid by additional postage stamps. They were printed by either McCorquodale & Co Ltd or De La Rue, who imprinted the name of their company on the envelopes. Elizabeth II envelopes initially remained in use after independence, and in 1972 they were overprinted with denominations in cents, the new Malta pound being divided into 100 cents from May 1972. From 1974 to 1995, a number of envelopes with the imprinted stamp showing the coat of arms of Malta were issued. The country's coat of arms changed twice during this period, first in 1975 and then in 1988, and in both cases envelopes were issued with the old symbols obliterated, usually also being replaced by the new emblem imprinted next to or affixed over the older one.

=== Pre-stamped envelopes ===
Malta issued its first pre-stamped envelopes in 1900. These came in three different sizes, and they had an imprinted 1d stamp depicting Queen Victoria. These proved to be unpopular, and no further pre-stamped envelopes were issued until this type of postal stationery was reintroduced by MaltaPost on 16 September 2002. The envelopes came in two designs, with imprinted stamps for local mail depicting a luzzu and those for foreign mail depicting a map. These envelopes were popular, and they were issued in a number of different sizes and formats. On 20 May 2006, a new design depicting a Neolithic spiral design was introduced for the local envelopes. These were also issued in a number of sizes and formats.

Another new design of local pre-stamped envelopes was introduced in 2011. The imprinted stamps depict a spiral design similar to 2006, along with an architectural element from one of the megalithic temples. Various denominations and formats of these envelopes have been issued since then, and they remain in use as of 2020. MaltaPost also allows companies to order personalised versions with their logo printed on the envelope.

=== Aerogrammes ===
Malta issued two pre-stamped aerogrammes in 1971, and they had imprinted versions of definitive stamps which had been issued a year earlier.

== Philately ==
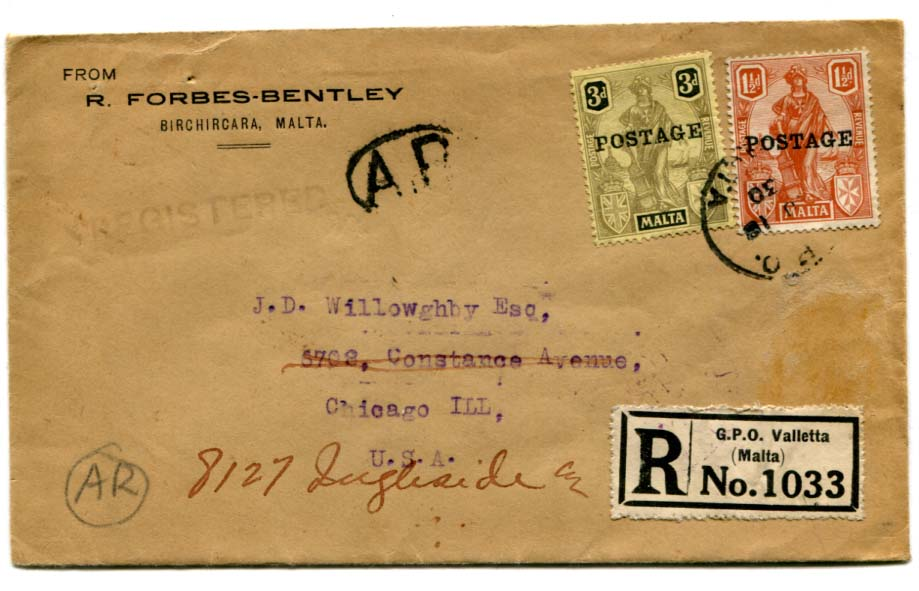
A 1930 AR registered cover sent from Malta to the United States by Rupert Forbes-Bentley, a stamp dealer

Stamp collecting existed in Malta soon after the Halfpenny Yellow was first issued in the 1860s. The hobby was popular on the islands during the British colonial period, and philatelic organisations such as the Malta Philatelic Society Zeitun existed in the 1930s and 1940s. There are a number of such organisations today, including the Malta Philatelic Society which was set up in 1966, the Gozo Philatelic Society which was set up in 1999 and the Żejtun Philatelic Group (Maltese: Il-Grupp Filateliku taż-Żejtun) which was set up in 2002.

The Malta Study Circle is a United Kingdom-based group with an interest in studying and exchanging information on Malta's stamps and postal history. The organisation was originally established in 1948, but it lapsed by 1952 before being revived by the philately expert Robson Lowe in 1955. Since then, it has published a number of study papers and regular newsletters about various aspects of Malta's philately.

Annual philatelic exhibitions are held by the Malta Philatelic Society and Gozo Philatelic Society in conjunction with MaltaPost. In the 2010s, such exhibitions also began to include other non-stamp collections.

== See also ==
- Designers of Maltese stamps
- Revenue stamps of Malta
- Postage stamps and postal history of the Sovereign Military Order of Malta

== Bibliography ==
- Buttigieg, Joseph, ed. (2012). The JB Catalogue of Malta Stamps and Postal History (21 ed.). Sliema: Sliema Stamp Shop Publishers.
- Buttigieg, Joseph, ed. (2014). The JB Catalogue of Malta Stamps and Postal History (22 ed.). Sliema: Sliema Stamp Shop Publishers.
- Kohn, George C. (2007). Encyclopedia of Plague and Pestilence: From Ancient Times to the Present. Infobase Publishing. ISBN 9781438129235.
- Mafrici, Mirella, ed. (2004). Rapporti diplomatici e scambi commerciali nel Mediterraneo moderno: atti del Convegno internazionale di studi, Fisciano, 23–24 ottobre 2002 (in English and Italian). Rubbettino Editore. ISBN 9788849813654.
- Proud, Edward B. (1999). The Postal History of Malta. Heathfield: Proud-Bailey Co. Ltd. ISBN 9781872465319. OCLC 43582096.
- Stanley Gibbons Stamp Catalogue: Commonwealth and British Empire Stamps 1840–1970 (117 ed.). London: Stanley Gibbons. 2015. ISBN 978-0-85259-918-1.
