= MaltaPost =

National postal service company of Malta

MaltaPost p.l.c.

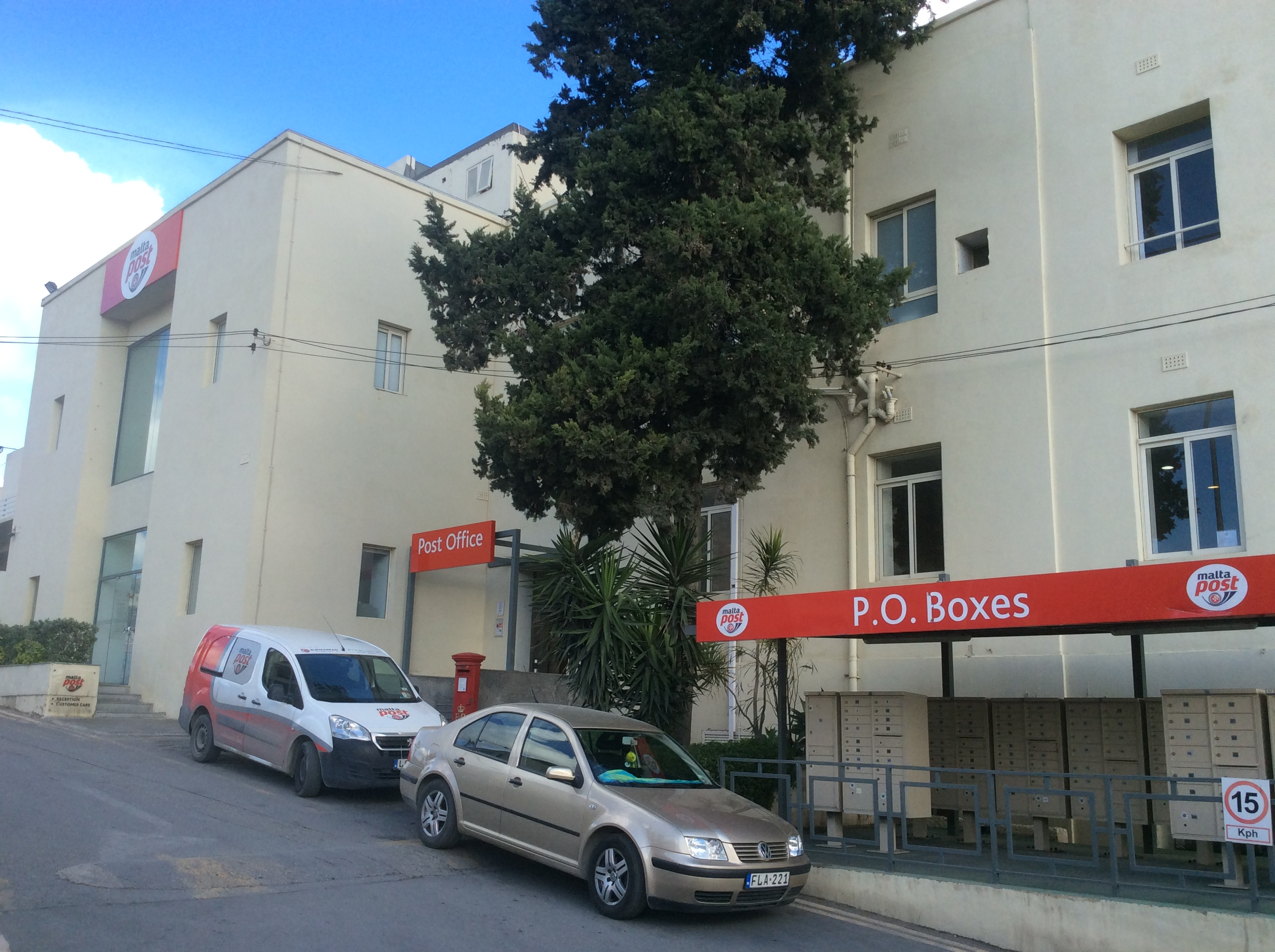
- MaltaPost Head Office at Marsa
- Type: Public limited company
- Traded as: MSE: MTP
- Industry: Postal service
- Predecessor: Posta Limited
- Founded: 16 April 1998
- Headquarters: Marsa, Malta
- Area served: Malta
- Website: maltapost.com

MaltaPost p.l.c. is the postal service company in Malta. The public limited company took over the postal services previously carried out by Posta Limited, and started operating on 1 May 1998.

== History ==
MaltaPost p.l.c. was registered with the Malta Registry of Companies as a public limited company on 16 April 1998. It took over from Posta Limited on 1 May of that year. On 31 January 2002, MaltaPost was partially privatized when the government sold 35% to Transcend Worldwide Ltd, a subsidiary company of New Zealand Post Ltd. In September 2007 the government sold 25% of its shareholding in MaltaPost to Lombard Bank plc, which effectively became the majority shareholder in the company with 60% shareholding. The other 40% were sold to the public in January 2008.

In 2011 MaltaPost carried out a series of reforms, including adopting a new logo.

MaltaPost inaugurated the Malta Postal Museum in June 2016.

== Stamps ==
MaltaPost issued its first stamps on 27 May 1998, and the issue consisted of a set of 4 commemorating the International Year of the Ocean. Less than a year after MaltaPost took over, in early 1999, the German company Bundesdruckerei began printing Maltese stamps instead of the local company Printex Limited. MaltaPost's first definitive was issued between 1999 and 2003, and it showed Maltese flowers. In 2004, Printex began printing Maltese stamps once again. Since then, the number of sets per year has increased and photography began to be used more often on stamps, especially in 2008–2009. Many recent issues are based on paintings or photos or graphic designs designed by MaltaPost itself. Many stamps are based on local topics, and English is the predominant language on stamps. MaltaPost takes part in various stamp issuing programmes including EUROPA and SEPAC.

Since 2022 there have been a lot of sets with high values when standard local postage is €0.37.

== Outlets ==
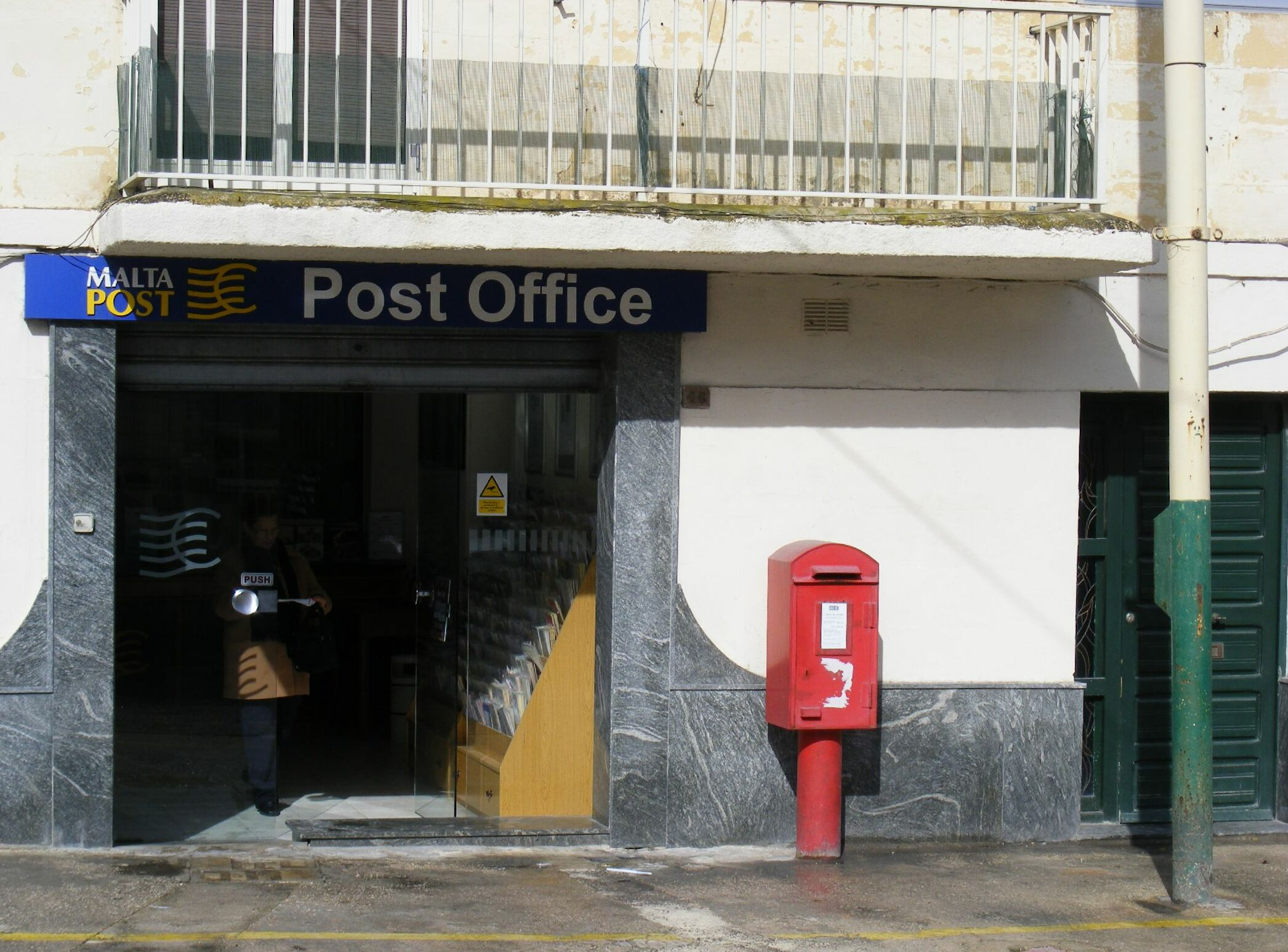
Birżebbuġa Branch Post Office

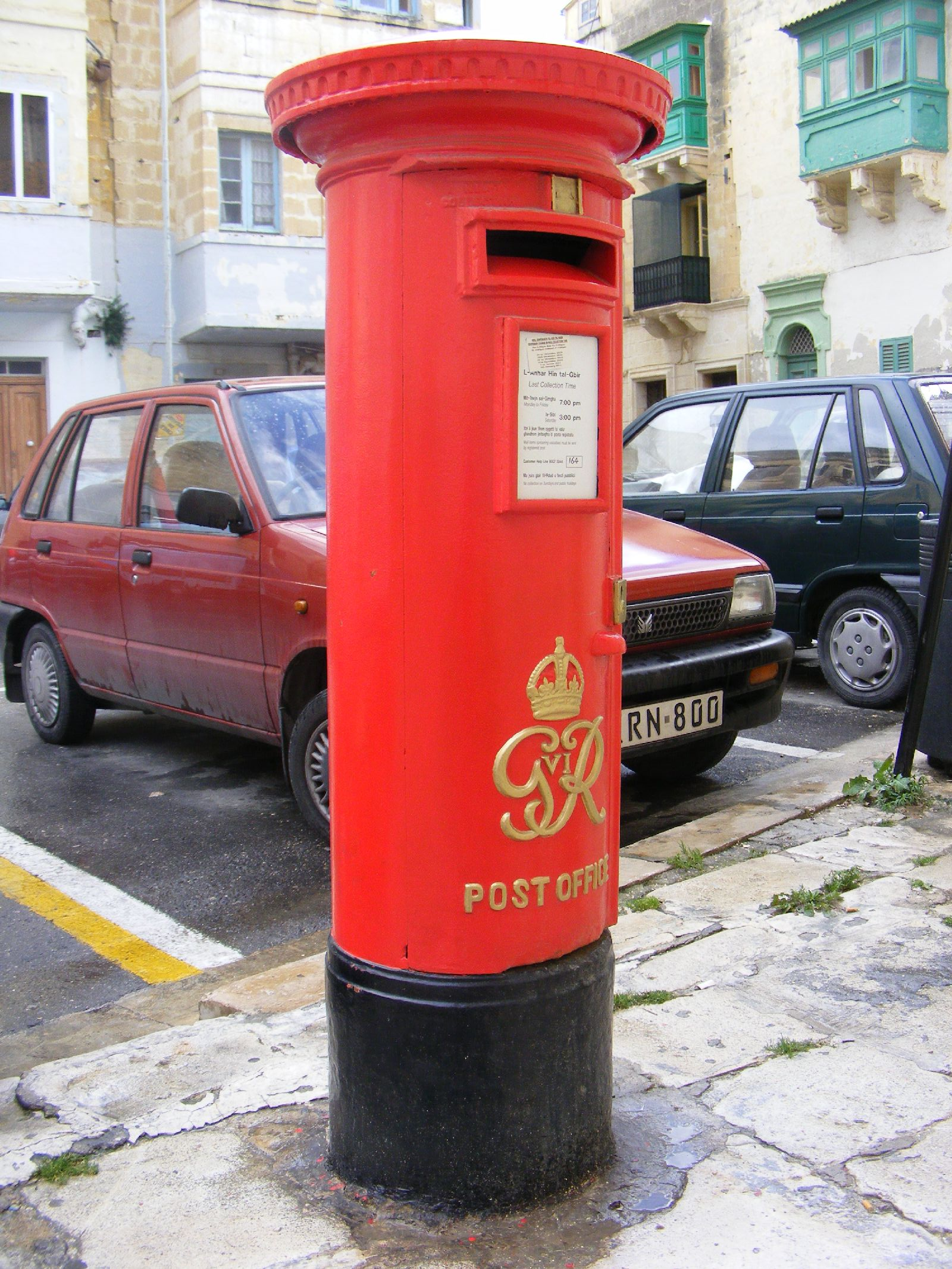
Colonial pillar box in Senglea.

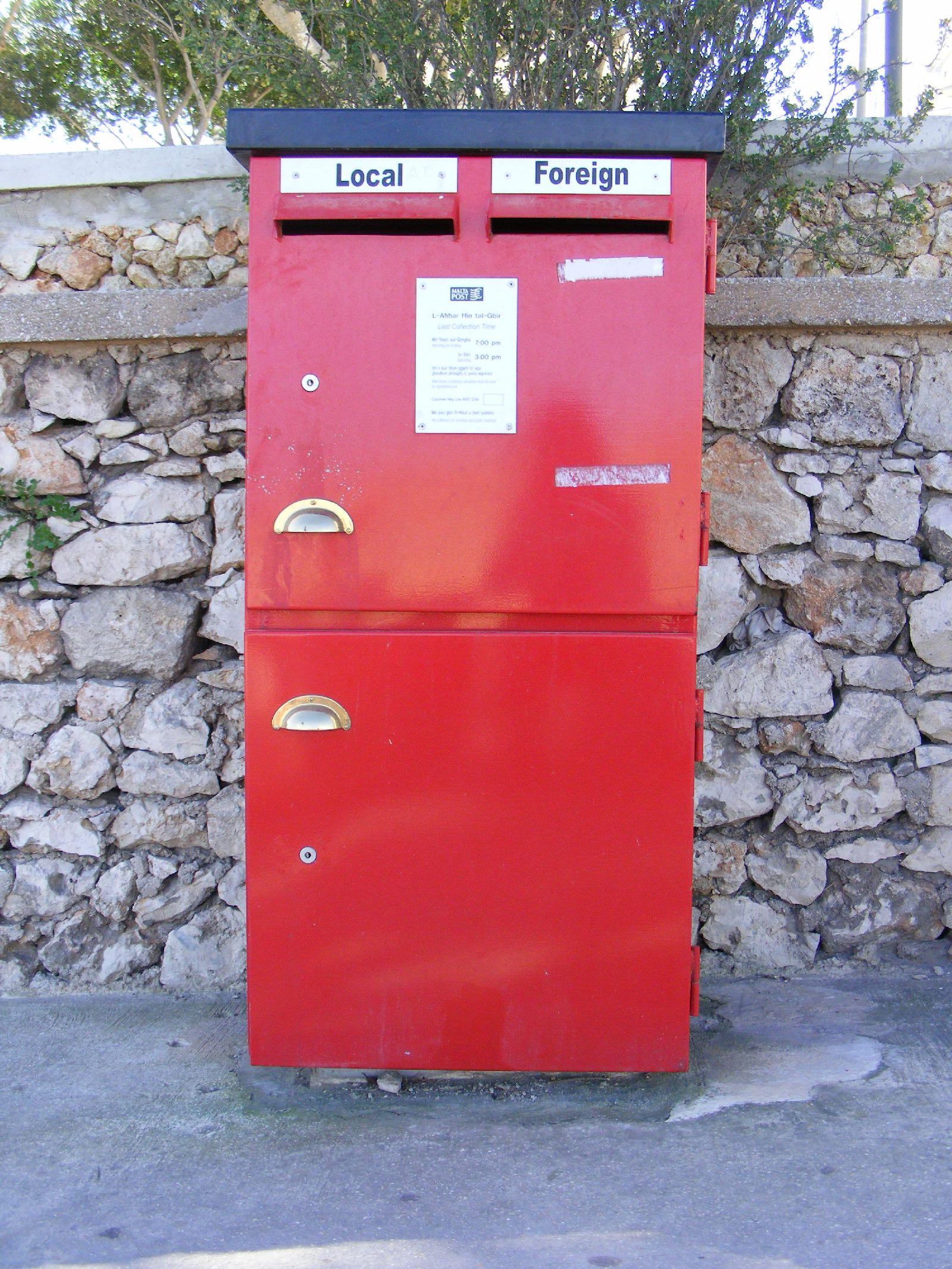
Modern post box in Mellieħa.

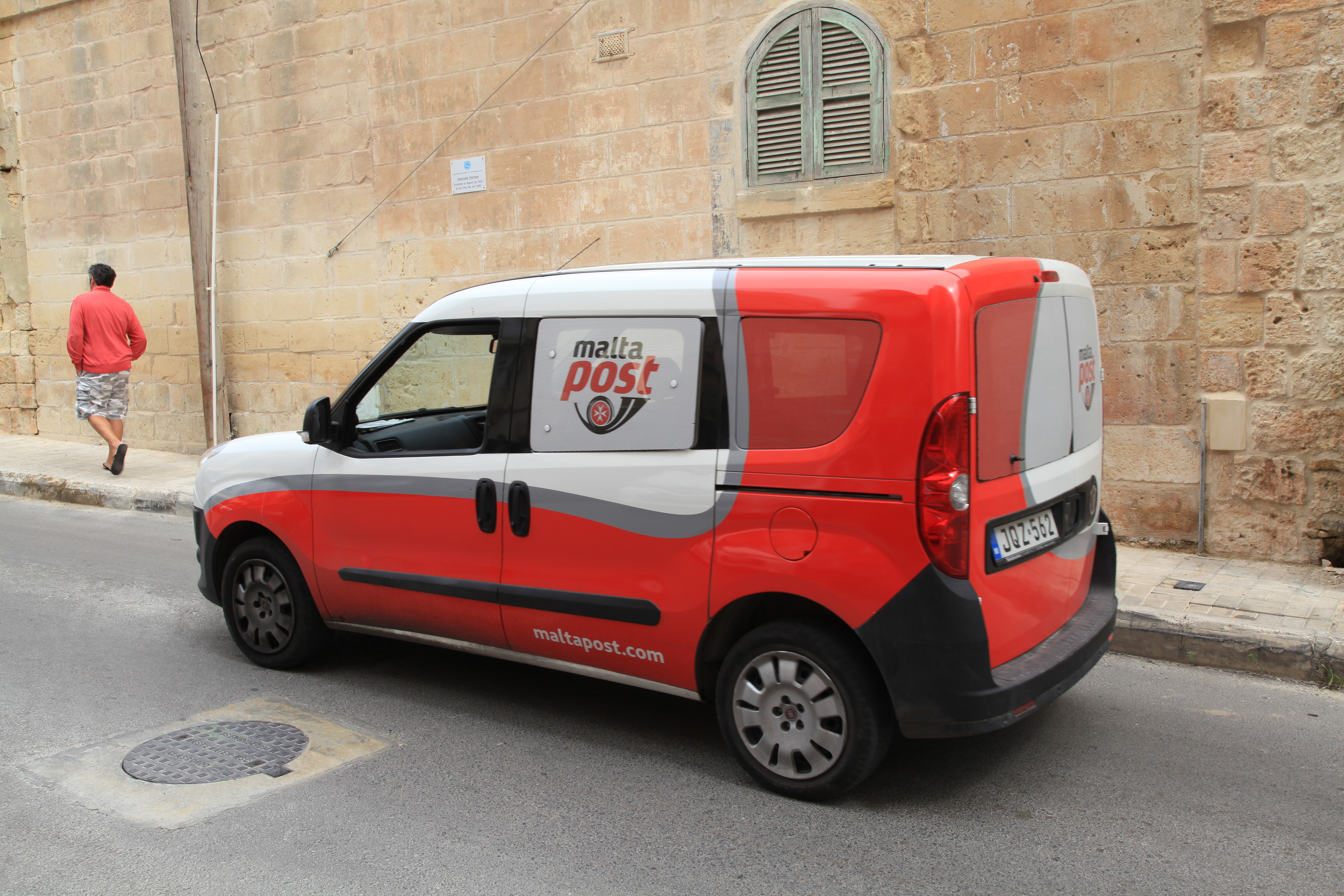
MaltaPost Fiat Doblò Mk2 van in St. Julian's.

=== Postal hubs ===
There are 4 hubs in Malta and 1 in Gozo, each locality in Malta and Gozo is under one of these hubs.

Name	Address	Locality
Central 1 Hub	Qormi Road	Marsa
Central 2 Hub	Mensija Road	San Ġwann
South Hub	Our Lady of Sorrows Street	Żejtun
North Hub	St Paul's Street	San Pawl il-Bahar
Gozo Hub	Saint Elizabeth Street	Xewkija, Gozo

=== Post offices ===
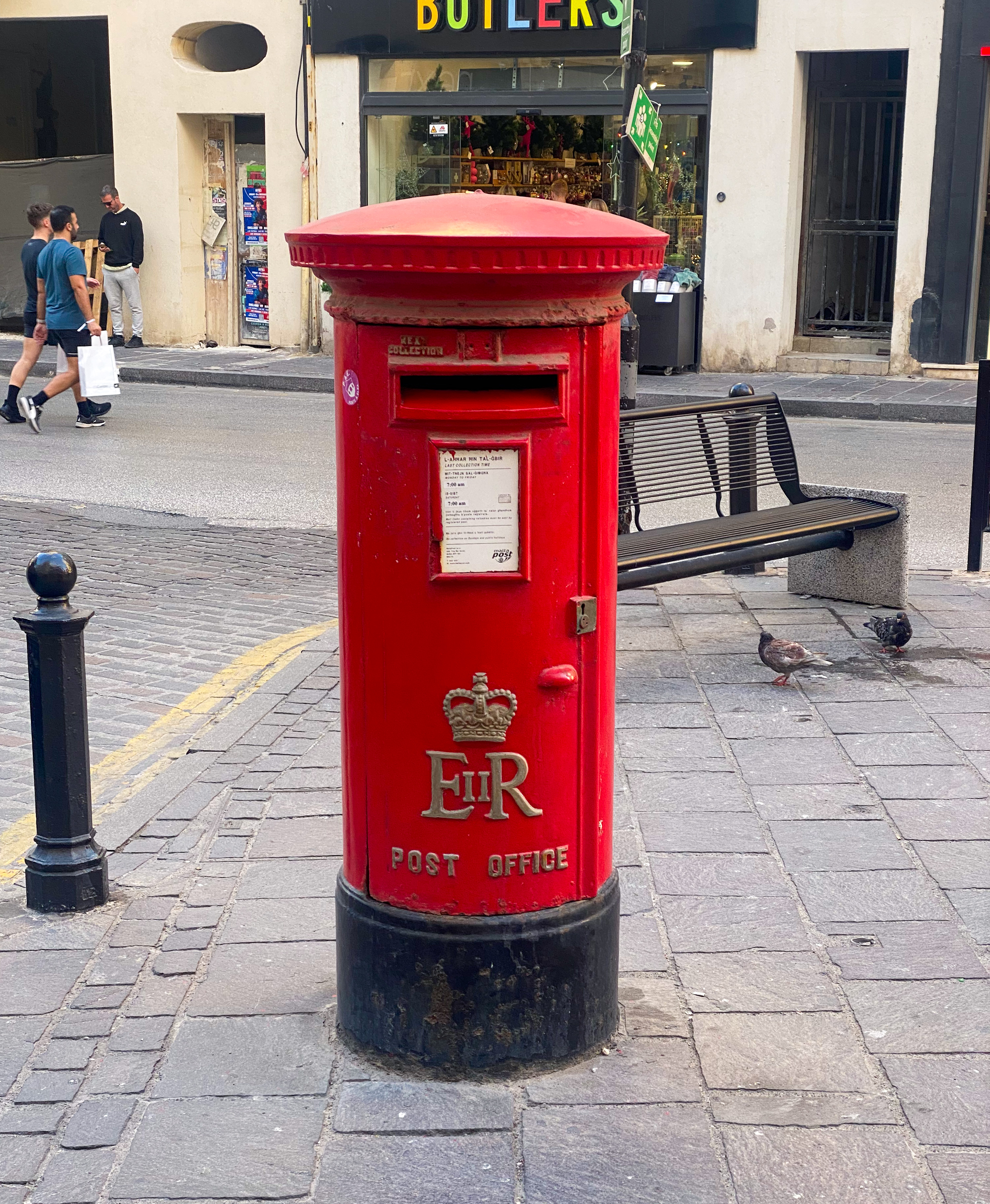
Post box in Sliema with royal monogram of Queen Elizabeth II.

A code starting with "R" indicates a Branch Post Office (BPO), and one with "S" indicates a Sub Post Office (SPO). The latter are usually located in shops such as stationers. Currently (September 2015) MaltaPost operates 35 BPOs (including 5 in Gozo) and 28 SPOs (including 3 in Gozo).

Code	Address	Locality
R01	Qormi Road	Marsa
R02	Victory Street	Qormi
R03	Dun Ġulju Muscat Street	Luqa
R04	Malta International Airport	Luqa
R05	Saint Catherine Street	Żurrieq
R06	Sciortino Street	Żebbuġ
R07	Parish Square	Rabat
R08	Main Street	Balzan
R09	Valley Road	Birkirkara
R10	21 September Avenue	Naxxar
R11	Constitution Street	Mosta
R12	New Windmill Street	Mellieħa
R13	Wax Alley	San Pawl il-Baħar
R14	Dolmen Street	Buġibba
R15	Naxxar Street	San Ġwann
R16	Paceville Street	San Ġiljan
R17	Manwel Dimech Street	Sliema
R18	Meme' Scicluna Square	Gżira
R19	Gwardamanġa Hill	Pietà
R20	Ferrovija Street	Ħamrun
R21	Castille Square	Valletta
R22	Old Bakery Street	Valletta
R23	Antoine de Paule Square	Paola
R24	Fuq San Pawl	Bormla
R25	Convent Street	Żabbar
R26	Saint Lucian Street	Żejtun
R27	Żarenu Dalli Street	Birżebbuġa
R28	Visitation Street	Għarb, Gozo
R29	Republic Street	Victoria, Gozo
R30	Racecourse Street	Xagħra, Gozo
R31	North Street	Nadur, Gozo
R32	J. F. de Chambray Street	Għajnsielem, Gozo
R33	University Campus	Msida
R34	Sir Adrian Dingli Street	Sliema
R35	G. Bessiera Street	Swieqi
S01	Saint Nicholas Square	Siġġiewi
S02	Parish Street	Mqabba
S04	Eroj Swatar Square	Birkirkara
S06	Marina Street	Marsaskala
S07	Victory Square	Birgu
S08	Archbishop Gonzi Square	Kalkara
S09	Saint Thomas Street	Fgura
S10	Market Square	Tarxien
S12	Frenċ Abela Square	Dingli
S14	Ġorġ Borg Olivier Street	Mellieħa
S15	Kananea Street	Attard
S16	Mannarino Street	Birkirkara
S17	L. Casolani Street	Birkirkara
S20	Saint Bartholomeo Street	Għargħur
S21	Feliċ Borġ Street	San Ġwann
S22	Ċensu Xerri Street	Sliema
S23	Testaferrata Street	Ta' Xbiex
S26	Our Lady of Sorrows Street	San Lawrenz
S29	Victory Street	Birkirkara
S30	Kaħli Street	San Pawl il-Baħar
S31	Orvieto Street	Kerċem, Gozo
S32	Manoel de Vilhena Street	Gżira
S33	Wesgħa Bir Id-Deheb	Għaxaq
S35	Marfa Road	Mellieħa
S36	Fleur-de-Lys Street	Santa Venera
S37	Glormu Cassar Street	Mosta
S38	Dun Karm Caruana Street	Għasri, Gozo
S39	Imhazen Street	Floriana

=== Other ===
There are an additional 431 authorized stamp vendors in Malta and Gozo. Letterboxes are also found in practically every locality.

== Postal codes ==
MaltaPost initially continued to use postal codes as they were in the 1990s. In 2007 they changed the postcodes of all addresses in the Maltese Islands. Each code consist of three letters, that differ by locality, and four numbers, for example MTP 1001 (the postcode of MaltaPost's main complex in Marsa).

== See also ==
- Postage stamps and postal history of Malta
