= Revenue stamps of Malta =

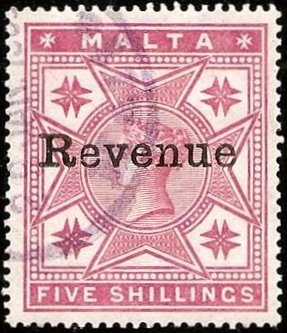
The 5/- value from Malta's first revenue issue of 1899

Revenue stamps of Malta were first issued in 1899, when the islands were a British colony. From that year to 1912, all revenue issues were postage stamps overprinted accordingly, that was either done locally or by De La Rue in London. Postage stamps also became valid for fiscal use in 1913, so no new revenues were issued until 1926–1930, when a series of key type stamps depicting King George V were issued. These exist unappropriated for use as general-duty revenues, or with additional inscriptions indicating a specific use; Applications, Contracts, Registers or Stocks & Shares. The only other revenues after this series were £1 stamps depicting George VI and Elizabeth II. Postage stamps remained valid for fiscal use until at least the 1980s.

Malta also used impressed duty stamps from the 1920s until these were replaced by pre-printed revenues in the 1970s. The latter were discontinued in the early 1990s. Malta also had specific stamps for Workmen's Compensation (1929–1956), passport fees (1933–1972), National Insurance (1956–1978) and Airport Charge (1975–1988). Excise stamps have been used to pay the tax on cigarettes since the 1930s, the tax on spirits since the 2000s, and the tax on wine since 2015. Excise imprints were also used on cinema, theatre and football match tickets from around the 1950s to the 1980s.

== General-duty revenues ==
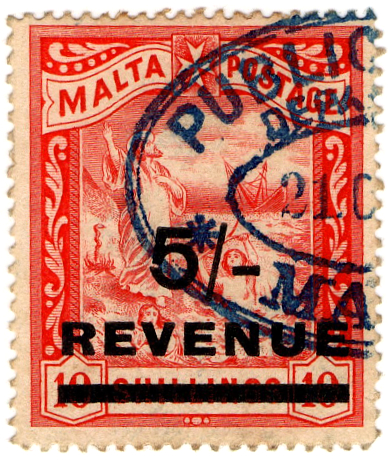
The 5/- stamp of 1908, overprinted on a special printing of the 10/- stamp in red (the stamp had been originally issued as a 10/- postage stamp in black in 1899)

Malta's first revenue stamps were issued on 9 August 1899, and this issue consisted of the ½d, 1d, 4d, 1/- and 5/- values from the 1885–1886 postage definitive issue depicting Queen Victoria locally overprinted Revenue at the Government Printing Office in Valletta. A number of overprint varieties, including double and inverted overprints, are known on this issue. On 17 November 1899, four values from the same set were issued overprinted REVENUE (in capitals) by De La Rue in London, and eight further values from the contemporary definitives depicting Queen Victoria or pictorial scenes were issued with this overprint in 1902.

In around 1904, a 3d postage stamp depicting King Edward VII was issued with a local Revenue overprint. From 1904 to 1912, some of the contemporary definitives depicting King Edward VII or pictorial scenes were also issued overprinted REVENUE by De La Rue, with the overprint being identical to that used on the 1899–1902 issue. In 1913, postage stamps became valid for fiscal use, so the issue of separate revenue stamps became unnecessary. Postage stamps remained valid for fiscal use until 1926, when a law was passed limiting their use for postal purposes only.

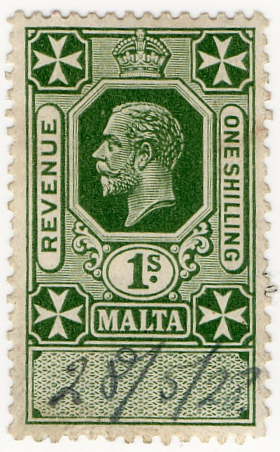
The 1/- value of 1926 depicting King George V

A new series of revenues depicting the Mackennal portrait of King George V was issued between 1926 and 1930. This issue consisted of eleven values ranging from ½d to £5, with some values being issued in more than one colour. These stamps were designed as key types, having a tablet at the bottom. The general-duty revenues were unappropriated (with the tablet left blank); for issues appropriated for a particular use see the "Key types" section below.

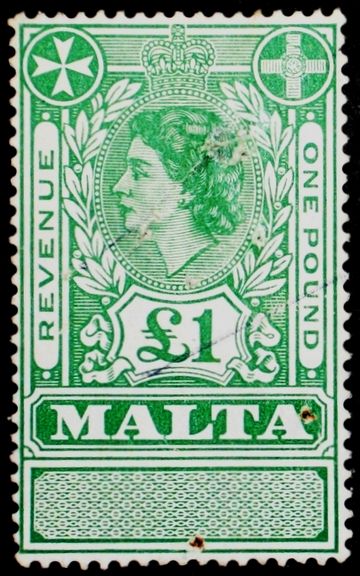
The £1 issue of 1954 depicting Queen Elizabeth II

In 1928, postage stamps became valid for fiscal use once again, and the lower values of the 1926 revenue issue were withdrawn. However, the £1 and £5 values remained in use since there were no postage stamps of those denominations. In 1941, a £1 revenue with the same design as the 1926–1930 series but bearing the portrait of King George VI was issued. This stamp was issued with a different perforation in 1948, and in 1954 a similar stamp with the portrait of Queen Elizabeth II was issued. Postage stamps remained valid for fiscal use until the 1990s.

=== Impressed and pre-printed revenues ===
Malta used impressed duty stamps from at least 1922 to 1973. A total of five issues are known, and all have a design bearing a Maltese cross together with a Tudor crown during the colonial era, or a mural crown after independence. All are embossed in vermilion ink.

The impressed revenues were replaced by pre-printed revenues on cheques, which were used between the mid-1970s and the early 1990s. These have a circular design inscribed STAMP DUTY and depict a Maltese cross. They can be found in several denominations, colours and sizes.

== Specific types ==
=== Key types ===
The general-duty revenues issued from 1926 onwards were designed as key types, having a tablet at the bottom where an additional inscription could be printed to indicate a specific use. In 1926, stamps appropriated with inscriptions for Applications, Contracts, Registers and Stocks & Shares were issued.

The Applications issue consisted of a single 3d value, while the Registers issue had a single ½d stamp. The Contracts issue consisted of twelve stamps ranging from ½d to £5, while the Stocks & Shares issue had eight values from 3d to £5.

The lower values of the key types were withdrawn in 1928, but the pound values remained in use until the 1950s.

=== Workmen's Compensation and National Insurance ===
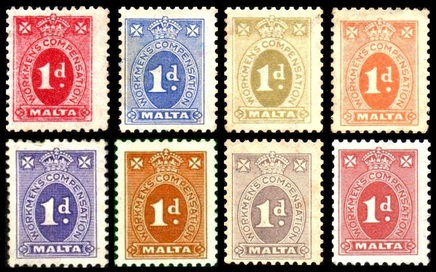
Workmen's Compensation stamps issued between 1929 and 1941

The Workmen's Compensation Ordinance (WCO) was an insurance that covered injuries and other accidents at work, and it was introduced on 29 April 1929. From that year to 1941, Workmen's Compensation (Maltese: Kumpens lill-Ħaddiem) stamps denominated 1d were issued with the colour being changed annually in order to prevent fraud (although some colours were reissued in different years). The issue for 1938–1939 was locally overprinted with the years of validity. The law was revised in 1943, resulting in a change in procedure and the need for 2d stamps. Between 1943 and 1946, old stocks of postage stamps and earlier WCO stamps were issued with provisional surcharges. These were followed by a new issue between 1944 and 1956 in the same design as the previous stamps, but denominated 2d and once again in various colours.

The WCO scheme was superseded by the National Insurance (NI) Act on 28 April 1956. Therefore, National Insurance (Maltese: Sigurtà Nazzjonali) stamps were required and old stocks of WCO issues were surcharged with new values. Between 1956 and 1966, a new set was issued, similar to the WCO types but with new inscriptions, values and colours. This issue incorporated a crown above the value, and after Malta achieved independence, a new design was issued omitting the crown. The latter series was issued between 1966 and 1971. Various provisional surcharges also exist on both sets. When the Maltese pound was adopted in 1972, new values were possibly issued but have never been recorded. Three decimal overprints are, however, known to exist. A new decimal design was introduced in around 1976. National Insurance stamps were withdrawn in 1978, after which NI contributions were paid directly to the Inland Revenue Department.

=== Passport ===
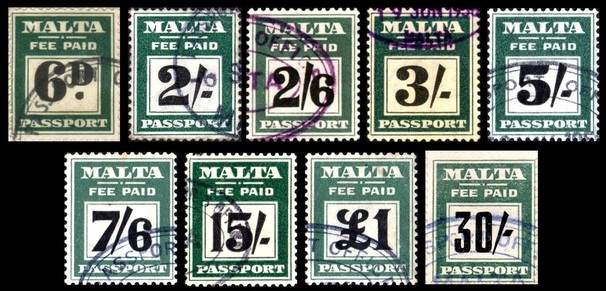
Passport stamps issued between 1933 and 1962

Malta's first passport stamps were issued in 1933, and they were inscribed FEE PAID and PASSPORT. The design was printed in deep green, with the value in black. Reprints and additional values to this issue continued until 1967.

A new design inscribed FEE PAID was issued in 1969, and these were printed in a range of different colours with the value in black. Only five values from this issue are known to exist, although it is likely that more values were issued. Passport stamps were withdrawn upon the adoption of the Maltese lira in 1972.

=== Excise ===
==== Cigarettes and alcohol ====
Malta has used excise stamps to pay for the tax on cigarettes since at least the 1930s. Early issues consisted of long strips which depicted the British coat of arms and were inscribed EXCISE DUTY in English and DAZJU in Maltese. A smaller design was issued for imported cigarettes. Long strips with a plain design without any ornamentation were introduced in the 1950s, while designs depicting a mural crown and a Maltese cross were issued after independence in 1964.

In 1972–1973, smaller designs depicting the post-independence coat of arms and denominated in the Maltese lira were issued. This design remained in use from the 1970s to the 1990s, with changes in the coats of arms in 1975 and 1988. A new series with a similar design but with the inscriptions altered to SISA in Maltese and EXCISE in English was introduced in around 1995. Specific types for imported cigarettes were also issued between the 1970s and the 1990s or 2000s. In around 2006, stamps inscribed EXCISE DUTY PAID and printed on silver foil incorporating a security hologram were introduced, and these exist in two designs. In 2017, similar stamps inscribed MT EXCISE were introduced.

Excise duty stamps to pay the tax on alcohol have been in use since 2006. Issues to pay the tax on spirits are printed on silver foil, with designs similar to those used on cigarettes, and they exist inscribed either EXCISE DUTY PAID or MT EXCISE. The excise duty on wine was introduced in 2015, and the first issue was inscribed EXCISE TAX STAMP and printed on gold foil. Later that year, paper strips and circular labels inscribed MT EXCISE were issued, and they are still in use as of 2017.

==== Entertainment tax ====
From the 1950s to the 1980s, cinema, theatre and football match tickets had an excise imprint indicating that a form of entertainment tax had been paid. From around 1953 to the late 1960s, the imprints were inscribed EXCISE REVENUE and had a crown in the centre, the design being based on the adhesive excise revenues used in the UK.

This was replaced by a design inscribed INLAND REVENUE and depicting a mural crown in the early 1970s. After Malta became a republic in 1974, designs depicting the new coat of arms were introduced, and they remained in use until at least 1985.

=== Airport Charge ===
On 1 July 1975, a Lm1 stamp depicting an aeroplane tail and a Maltese cross was issued to pay the Airport Charge (Maltese: Ħlas ta' l-Ajruport), a type of an airport improvement fee. This stamp replaced a series of Passenger Service Charge labels which had been in use since the 1960s or earlier. A Lm2 value with an identical design was issued on 24 March 1988.

== See also ==
- Postage stamps and postal history of Malta
- Designers of Maltese stamps
