= Melita =

Melita may refer to:

== Places ==
- Melite (ancient city), on the site of modern Mdina, Malta
- Melita (ancient port city), near the city of Melitopol in southeast Ukraine
- Melita, Manitoba, Canada, a town
- Melita (island), Latin name of Mljet, an island in the Dalmatia region of Croatia
- Melita, Michigan, United States
- Melita Island, Montana, United States

== People ==
- Melita (given name)

== Other uses ==
- Melita (crustacean) a genus of scuds in the family Melitidae
- Melita (personification), the allegorical figure of Malta
  - Melita issue, a series of stamps depicting the allegorical figure
  - Melita bullion coins, a series of coins depicting the allegorical figure
- Melita F.C., a football (soccer) club in Malta
- Melita (telecommunications company), a telecommunications company in Malta
- HMS Melita, two warships of the Royal Navy
- Melita Stadium, Chester Hill, New South Wales, Australia
- "Melita", an alternative tune to the hymn "Eternal Father, Strong to Save"
- Melita, a nymph in Greek mythology - see Melite (mythology)
- Melita: A Turkish Love-Story, an 1886 novel by Louise Marie Richter

== See also ==
- Malita, capital of the province of Davao Occidental, Philippines
- Melitta, Germany-based company selling coffee, paper coffee filters, and coffee makers
- Melito (disambiguation)
