= Dingli (surname) =

Dingli is a surname. Notable people with the surname include:

- Adrian Dingli (1817–1900), Maltese judge
- Alexiei Dingli (born 1979), Maltese professor and politician
- Debbie Caruana Dingli (born 1962), Maltese painter
- Edward Caruana Dingli (disambiguation):
  - Edward Caruana Dingli (artist) (1876–1950), Maltese artist
  - Edward Caruana Dingli (swimmer) (born 1992), Maltese swimmer
- Paolo Dingli, Maltese judge
- Sandra Dingli (born 1952), Maltese philosopher
- Tommaso Dingli (1591–1666), Maltese architect and sculptor
- Rosanne Dingli (born 1953) Australian author of literary and historical fiction
