= Melita issue =

Maltese postage stamp series

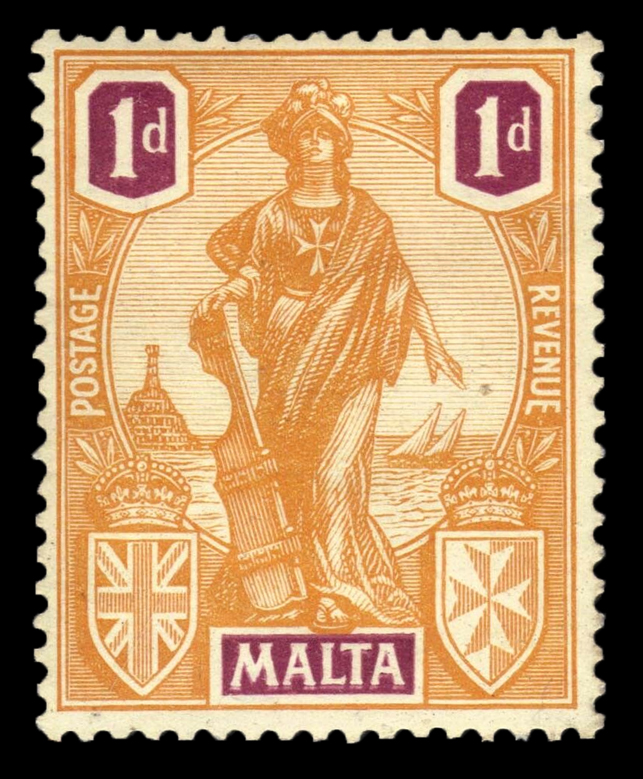
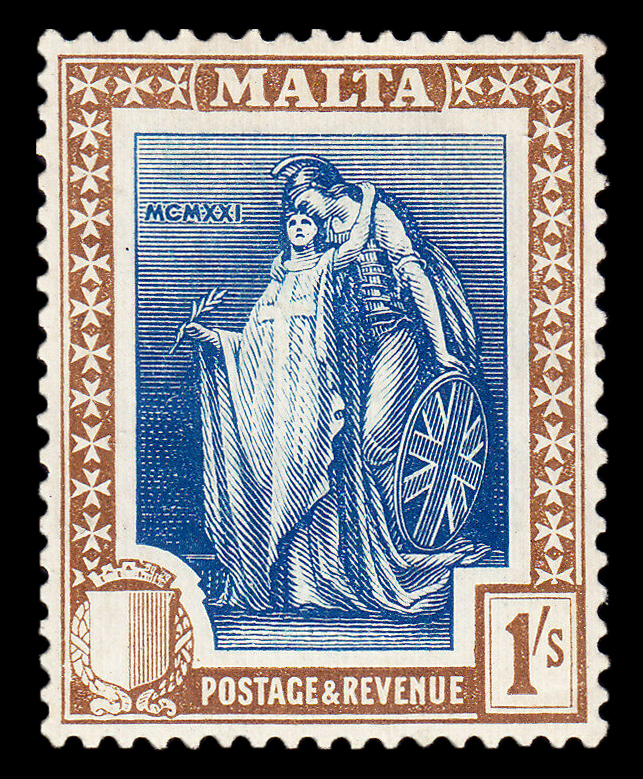
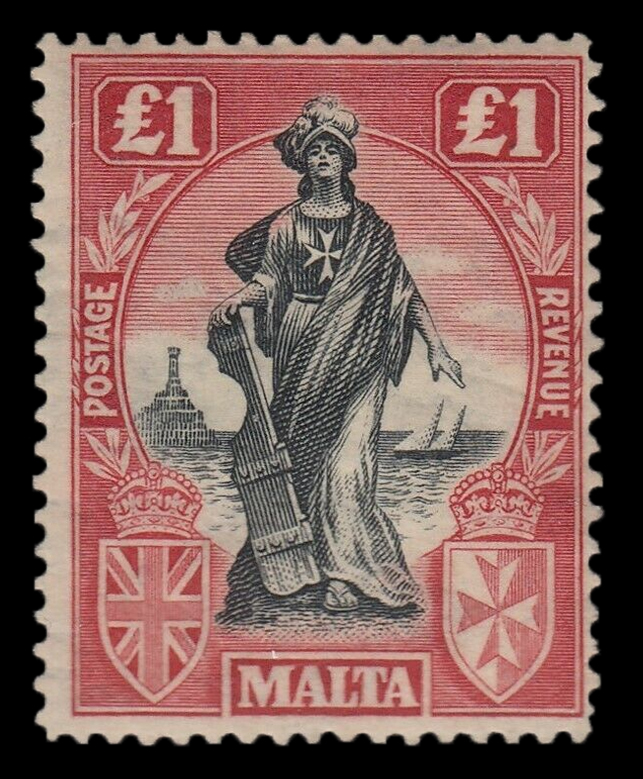
The different designs used in the Melita issue: pence values designed by Edward Caruana Dingli (left), shilling values by Gianni Vella (centre) and pound value by Caruana Dingli (right) (Note: There are minor design differences between Caruana Dingli's pence and pound values, including the shape of the value tablet and the typeface used for the country name.)

The Melita issue is a series of dual-purpose postage and revenue stamps issued by the Crown Colony of Malta between 1922 and 1926, depicting the national personification Melita. They were commemorative stamps since they celebrated the islands' new status as a self-governing colony following a new constitution in 1921, but also a definitive issue intended for regular use over an extended period of time.

Designed by two leading Maltese artists, Edward Caruana Dingli and Gianni Vella, the issue consisted of stamps in various denominations from ¼d to £1; Caruana Dingli's designs were used on the pence and pound values and Vella's design on the shilling values. The designs were poorly received when they were issued, and Caruana Dingli himself criticized the execution of the design. In subsequent years, however, Caruana Dingli's design came to be regarded as one of the most iconic Malta stamps, and his design for the figure of Melita formed the basis of the Maltese lira banknotes of 1989–2008 and gold and silver bullion coins minted since 2018.

== Background ==
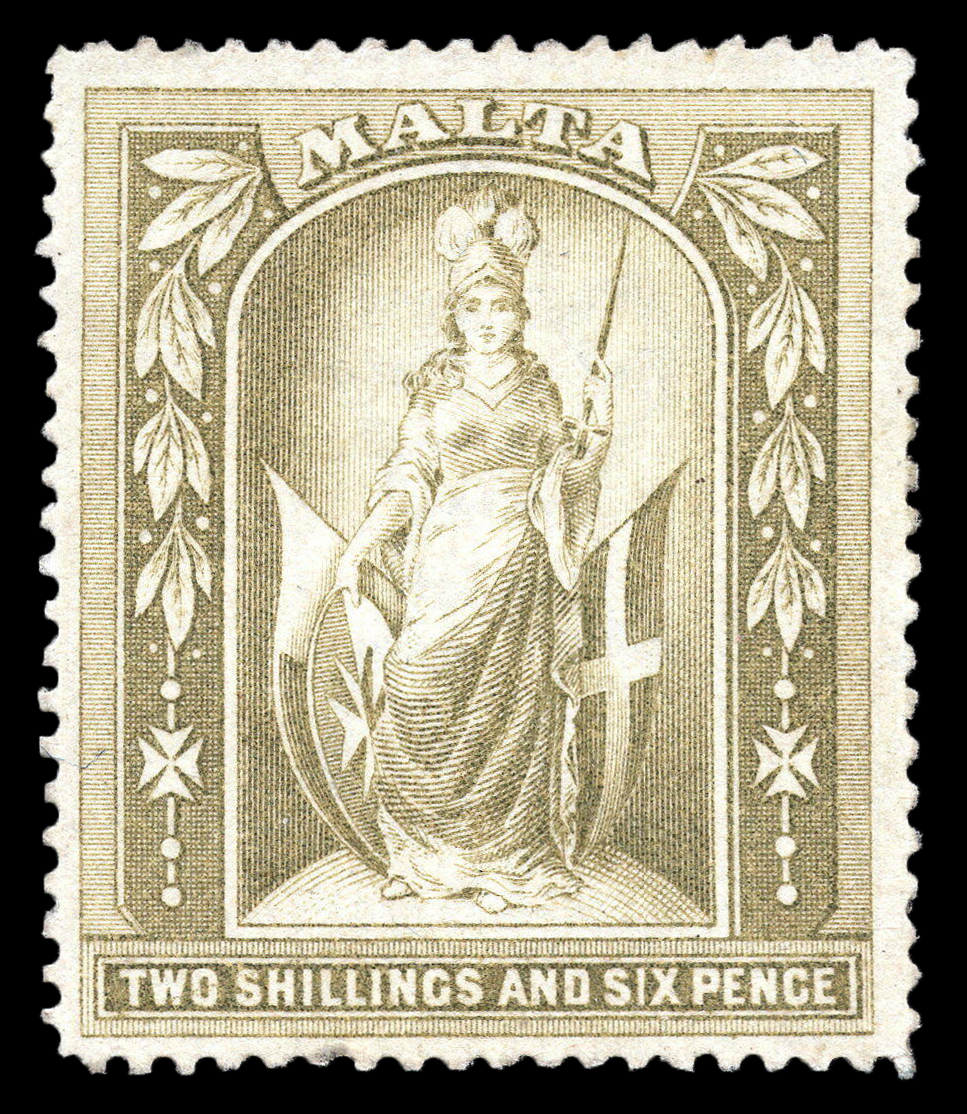
The 1899 Melita stamp

The oldest known depiction of a personification of Malta dates back to 1481. The figure of Melita seems to have developed from allegorical representations of the Order of St John, which ruled Malta between 1530 and 1798.

Melita first appeared on stamps in 1899. A 2s/6d olive-grey stamp depicted her holding a sword and a shield, the latter emblazoned with the Maltese cross. In the background were the flags of Malta and of the Order. This stamp was reissued with a different watermark in 1919, and remained in use until it was replaced by the 1922 Melita issue. Special printings of the 1899 design, sometimes in new colours or watermarks, were also issued with overprints for revenue purposes between 1902 and 1908.

In 1921, the Crown Colony of Malta was granted a limited form of self-government according to the Amery-Milner Constitution. This divided control of Malta between two governments: the Maltese Government and the Maltese Imperial Government. The former included a bicameral legislature with a Senate and Legislative Assembly, while the Imperial Government was led by the Governor of Malta, a British colonial official who retained direct responsibility of certain reserved matters such as defence and maintaining public order.

On 17 June 1921, a competition was announced calling for the design of a set of stamps to commemorate Malta's partial independence. The stamps were therefore to be commemoratives, but they were also intended as definitives for regular use over an extended period of time.

The Maltese wanted to issue the new stamps by the time the new parliament was inaugurated on 1 November 1921. There was not enough time for the stamps to be produced and delivered within that timeframe, however, since the printers De La Rue had to deal with a large workload, causing delays. The Malta Post Office therefore decided to overprint the then-current definitives (which depicted King George V and some pictorial scenes, including the 1919 reprint of the 1899 Melita design) with the words "SELF-GOVERNMENT" diagonally to commemorate the new constitution. The overprinting was carried out by the Government Printing Office in the capital Valletta, and the stamps were released between 12 January and 29 April 1922.

== Design ==
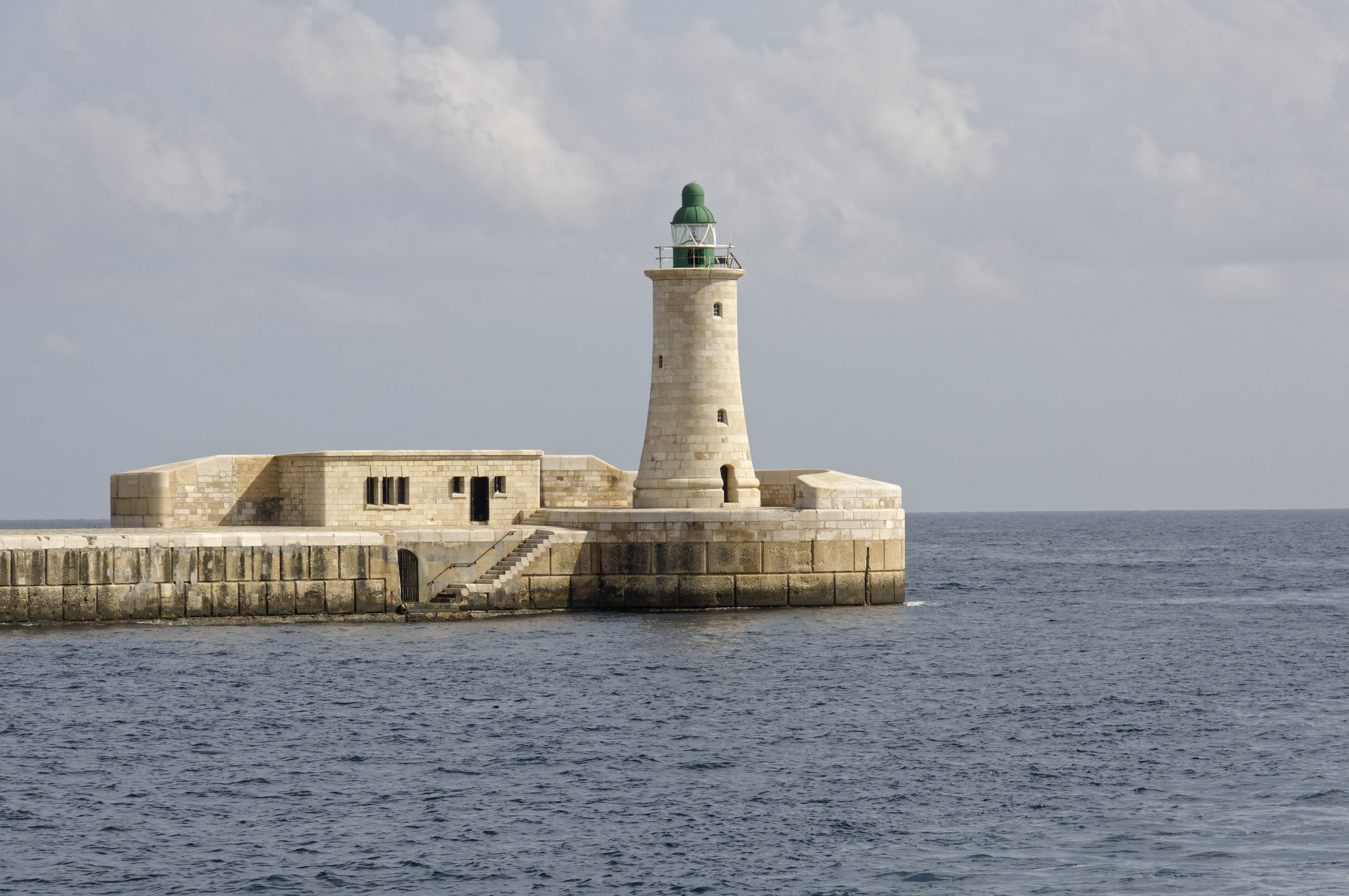
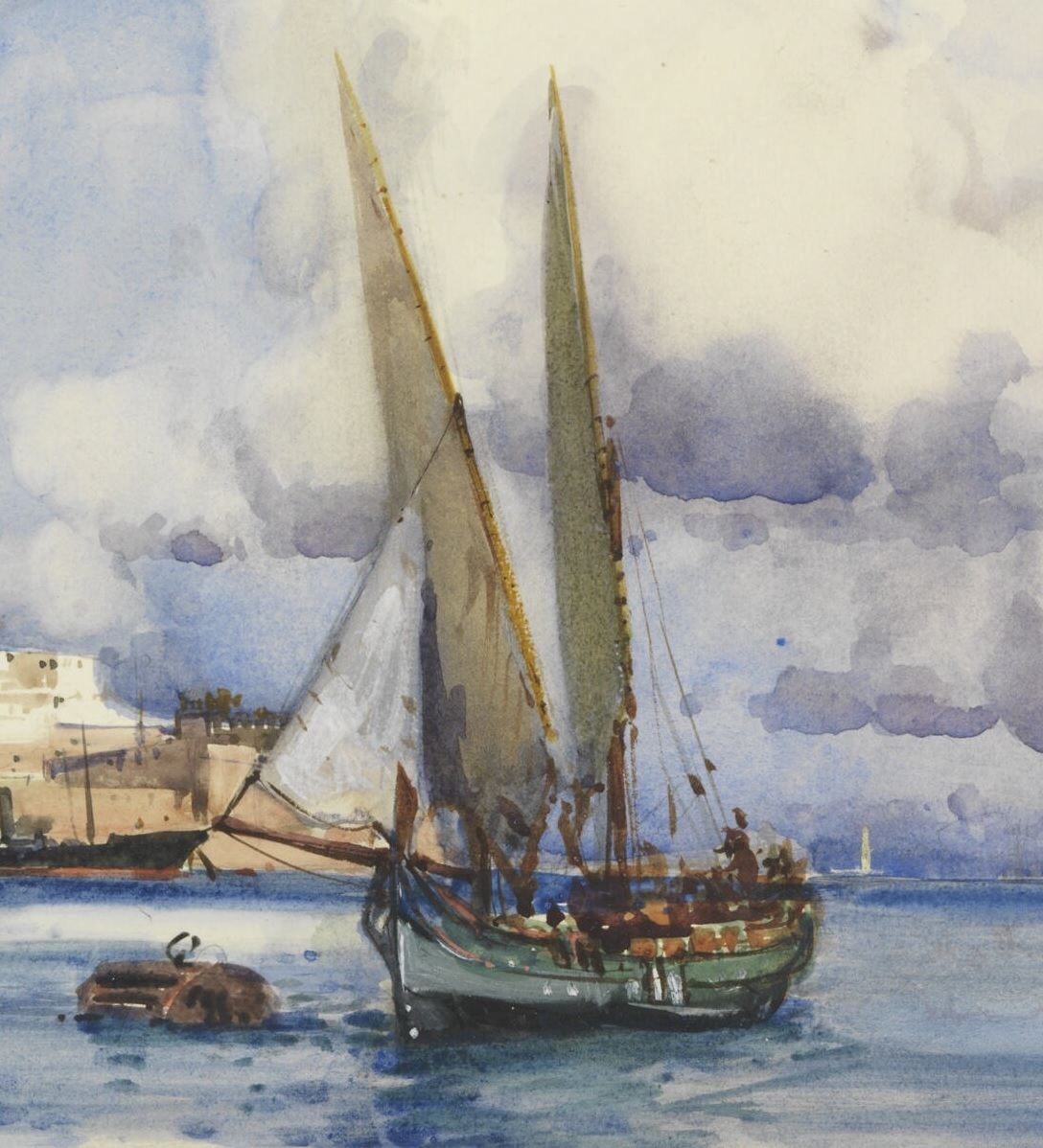
The St Elmo lighthouse and a Gozo boat (painting pictured) are depicted in the background of Caruana Dingli's design

Two designs were chosen from the competition, one by Edward Caruana Dingli and one by Gianni Vella. Caruana Dingli's design won first prize and it was used for ten denominations: the pence values ranging from ¼d to 6d, and also the highest value of the set, the £1. Vella's design was used for the five shilling values ranging from 1/- to 10/-.

Caruana Dingli's design depicts Melita as a robed and helmeted figure holding a rudder, representing Malta as being in control of her own destiny. The background contains a seascape, with the lighthouse near Fort Saint Elmo and a Gozo boat visible. Shields depicting the Union Jack and a colonial badge representing Malta are located at the bottom of the design.

Vella's design contains two figures representing Malta and the United Kingdom, Melita and Britannia. Melita holds an olive branch in her hand, and embraces Britannia by lifting her hand around Britannia's neck. Britannia wears a helmet and holds a shield with the Union Jack. The figure representing the United Kingdom is sometimes interpreted as being a male figure, but was intended as female, with the design representing Malta and Britain as sisters or mother and daughter. This represented the care and protection that Britain offered Malta, and symbolized friendly relations between them. This design also contains the Roman numerals MCMXXI (1921) to the left of the figures. The Maltese emblem is located at the lower left corner, while many small Maltese crosses frame the design.

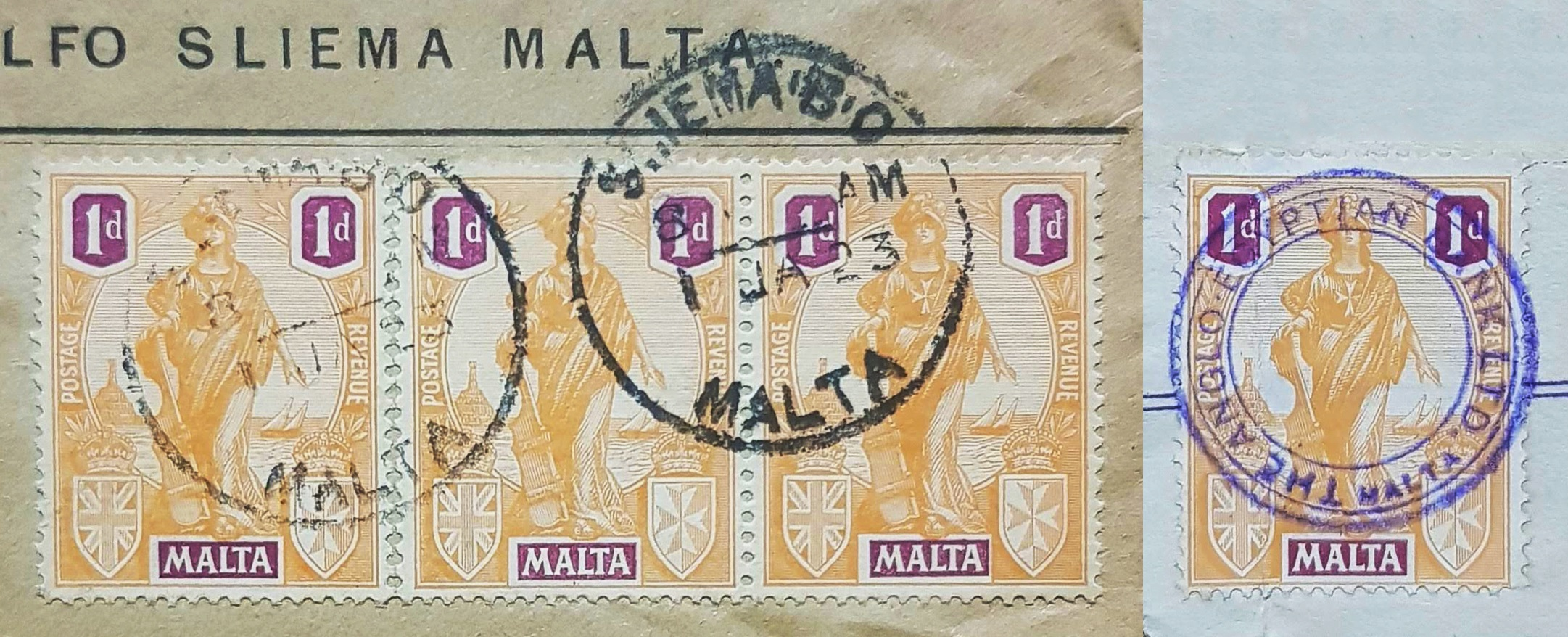
Examples of the 1d orange and purple postally used (strip of three with Sliema postmarks) and fiscally used (single with an Anglo-Egyptian Bank cancellation)

Both designs contain the inscription "POSTAGE [&] REVENUE", indicating that they were valid for use as both postage stamps and revenue stamps. They can therefore be found both postally and fiscally used.

== Technical details ==
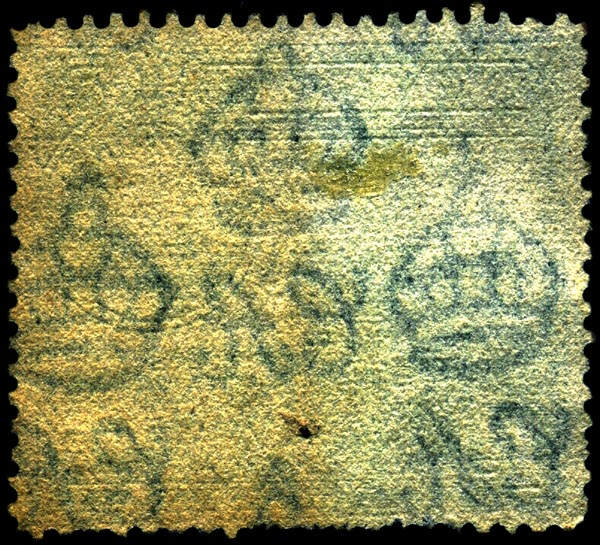
The Multiple Script CA watermark

The stamps of the Melita issue were printed by De La Rue using Letterpress printing, with the exception of the £1 top value which was recess-printed. The typographed stamps were printed on chalk-surfaced paper. Each stamp was printed in two operations, with a key plate and a duty plate. In most cases each plate was printed in a different colour, but for some of the low values both plates were printed in the same colour.

The watermark used on the stamps is known as Multiple Script CA, since it consists of the letters "CA" (referring to the Crown Agents) in a script typeface, beneath a representation of the Tudor crown, arranged multiple times next to each other. The watermark was sideways for the pence values and upright for the shilling values. The £1 was initially printed with a sideways watermark but in 1925 it was also issued with an upright watermark.

The pence values were printed in sheets of 160 stamps (consisting of two panes, each containing 8 rows of 10 stamps, separated by a gutter), the shilling values were printed in sheets of 80 (one pane of 8 rows of 10 stamps) and the £1 value was printed in sheets of 40 (one pane of 4 rows of 10 stamps). The stamps were perforated with gauge 14.2 by 14 comb perforations.

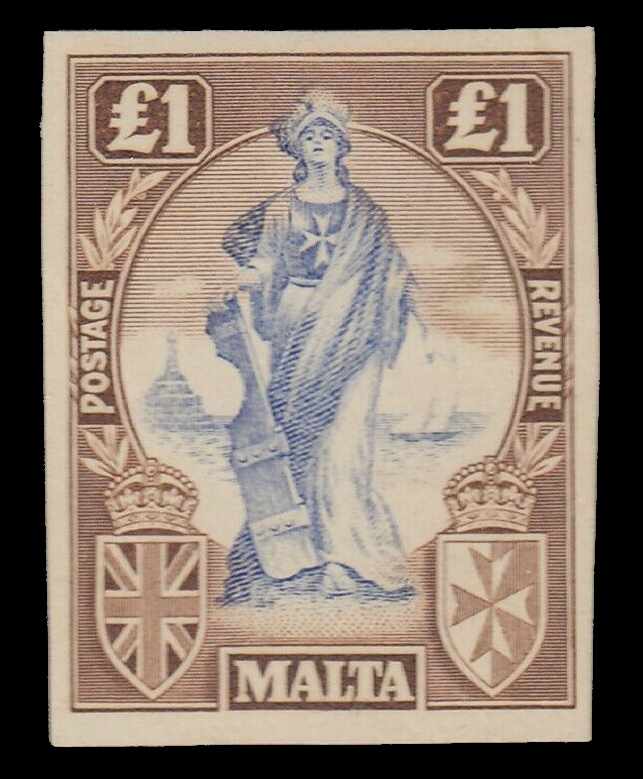
Printer's sample of the £1 stamp in unissued colours of blue and brown

A number of die proofs and plate proofs of stamps from the Melita issue exist. Die proofs are individual prints from the stamps' original dies made at various stages of production, and are impressions of either the key die or the duty die of each value, or composite die proofs of both dies together. Plate proofs, which are test printings made from the stamps' printings plates, exist of the ¼d, ½d, 1d, 3d and £1 values in unissued colours. A wide range of versions of these exist, either perforated or imperforate, on unwatermarked or watermarked paper, and with or without a specimen overprint. Specimens of all the stamps in the issued colours also exist, except for the reprints made in slightly different shades, the 1925 2½d on 3d surcharge, and the 1926 postage overprints.

== Issued stamps ==
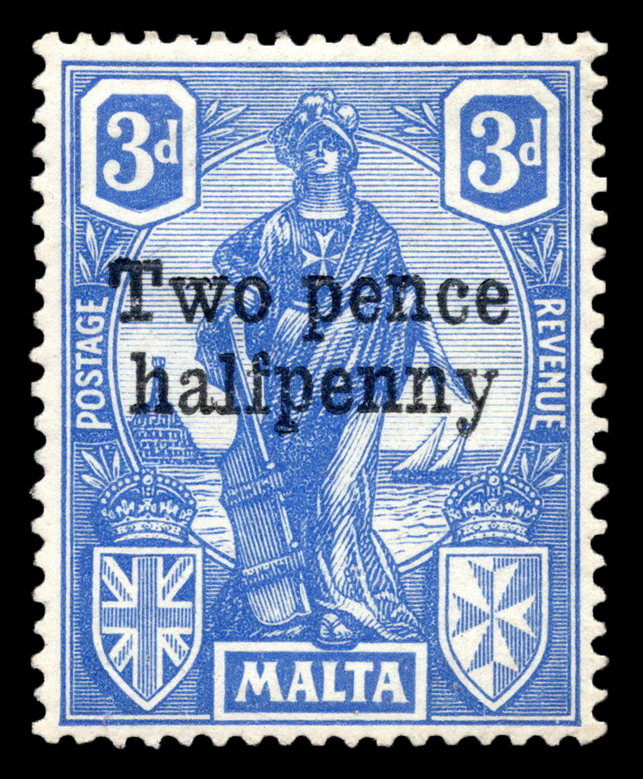
The 1925 2½d on 3d surcharge

The first Melita stamps were issued on 1 August 1922, with the denominations of ½d, 1d, 6d, 1/- and 2/-. A ¼d value was issued on 22 August, followed by 2d, 3d, 4d, 2/6, 5/-, 10/- and £1 values on 28 August. A 1½d value was added on 1 October 1923. On 25 April 1924, the 1d value was reissued in a new colour while the ¼d and 3d were reissued in slightly different shades. The £1 was reissued in a slightly different shade and with a different orientation of the watermark on 14 May 1925.

A requirement for a 2½d value arose in 1925 when the foreign-letter rate was reduced; stocks of the 3d were overprinted "Two pence halfpenny" by the Government Printing Office and were issued on 3 December 1925. A 2½d value and the 3d in a new colour were subsequently issued on 16 February 1926.

Denomination	Colour 1	Colour 2	Paper	Watermark orientation	Date of issue
¼d	brown		white, chalk-surfaced	sideways	22 August 1922
¼d	chocolate-brown		white, chalk-surfaced	sideways	25 April 1924
½d	green		white, chalk-surfaced	sideways	1 August 1922
1d	orange	purple	white, chalk-surfaced	sideways	1 August 1922
1d	bright violet		white, chalk-surfaced	sideways	25 April 1924
1½d	brown-red		white, chalk-surfaced	sideways	1 October 1923
2d	bistre-brown	turquoise	white, chalk-surfaced	sideways	28 August 1922
2½d on 3d	cobalt		white, chalk-surfaced	sideways	3 December 1925
2½d on 3d	bright ultramarine		white, chalk-surfaced	sideways	9 December 1925
2½d	ultramarine		white, chalk-surfaced	sideways	16 February 1926
3d	cobalt		white, chalk-surfaced	sideways	28 August 1922
3d	bright ultramarine		white, chalk-surfaced	sideways	25 April 1924
3d	black		yellow, chalk-surfaced	sideways	16 February 1926
4d	yellow	bright blue	white, chalk-surfaced	sideways	28 August 1922
6d	olive-green	reddish violet	white, chalk-surfaced	sideways	1 August 1922
1/-	indigo	sepia	white, chalk-surfaced	upright	1 August 1922
2/-	brown	blue	white, chalk-surfaced	upright	1 August 1922
2/6	bright magenta	black	white, chalk-surfaced	upright	28 August 1922
5/-	orange-yellow	bright ultramarine	white, chalk-surfaced	upright	28 August 1922
10/-	slate-grey	brown	white, chalk-surfaced	upright	28 August 1922
£1	black	carmine-red	white, ordinary	sideways	28 August 1922
£1	black	bright carmine	white, ordinary	upright	14 May 1925

Some stamps exist with an inverted watermark, and flaws are known on the 1d and 3d values.

== 1926 Postage overprints ==
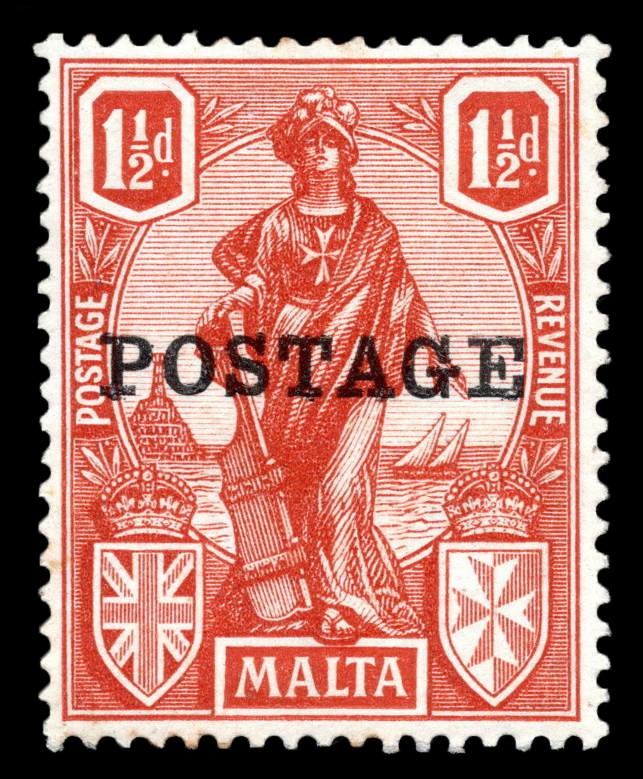
The 1½d with the "POSTAGE" overprint

Due to a change in procedure, dual-purpose postage-and-revenue stamps were discontinued in 1926 and replaced by separate issues of postage stamps and revenue stamps, so it was decided to overprint the stamps of the Melita issue with the word "POSTAGE". The forme of the overprint was prepared by John Muscat Fenech and Carmelo Cacopardo, and the overprinting was hastily carried out by the Government Printing Office on a Warfedale printing press in the last week of March 1926. The ink used in the overprinting was a special mix made at the Office of Public Health. The overprinting was applied to all the stamps from ¼d to 10/-, except those which had been earlier replaced by new colours, and the stamps were issued on 1 April 1926. The overprint was reportedly also applied to a small quantity of the £1 stamp, but these were never issued and a decision was made to destroy the stock. The issued overprints were on sale for only about a week, and a new series of stamps bearing the "POSTAGE" inscription was issued only five days later on 6 April.

Some stamps with errors were detected during the printing, and these were kept by the Acting Postmaster General before being burnt at the Power Station. Despite this, some stamps with errors still ended up in circulation, including the 3d value with the overprint inverted, and various denominations with the overprints misplaced to varying degrees, the most notable being a variety of the 4d in which the overprint reads "AGE POST".

=== 3d with inverted overprint ===
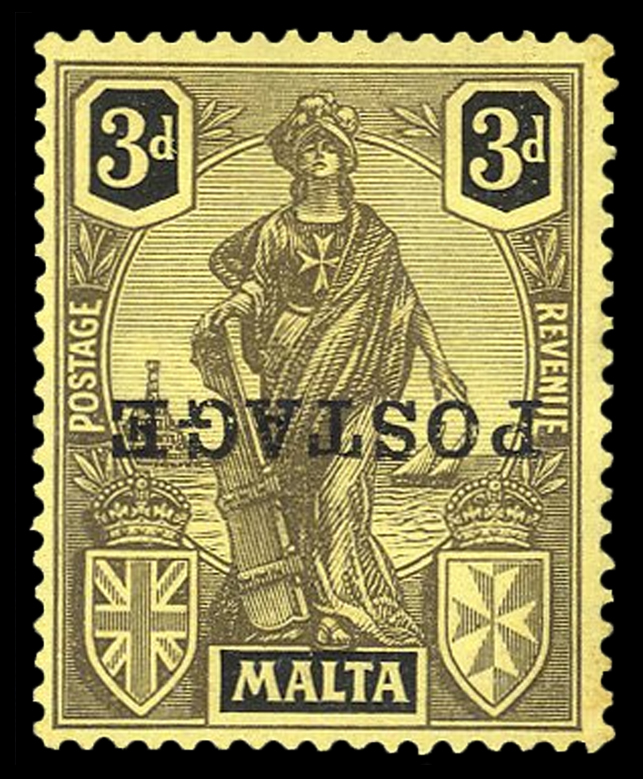
The 3d with the "POSTAGE" overprint inverted

The 3d black on yellow is known with the overprint inverted, and it is one of Malta's best-known error stamps. It is believed that only two sheets of the error were printed, and they were allegedly acquired on the first day of issue by politician Alfredo Caruana Gatto, then a Senator and a former Minister for Justice. The exact circumstances of their issue remain unclear, and it is not known whether they were acquired over the Post Office counter or not. Caruana Gatto is said to have immediately sold the two sheets to the speculators Carol Saliba and Pio Grech, and the sheets were eventually broken down and sold to stamp dealers and collectors. A small amount of the error stamps were used on mail by philatelists (including on letters addressed to themselves, posted for the purpose of acquiring the stamp in used condition), but the vast majority were retained in mint condition.

In 1930, uncertainty about the stamp's issue formed the basis of a political campaign by the Constitutional Party against the Nationalist Party which became known as the "Postage Stamps Scandal". The matter was brought up in the Legislative Assembly on 31 March 1930 when Constitutional Party member Alfred Gera De Petri asked Robert Hamilton, the Minister for Posts, about the circumstances of the stamp's issue. A committee was later appointed to investigate the matter, and it included Gerald Strickland, Hamilton, Walter Salomone, Paul Boffa and Ugo Pasquale Mifsud.

The committee members belonging to the Constitutional Party produced a report in which they stated that there was no evidence that the error was ever sold at a Post Office or that Caruana Gatto (who had died in 1926) had sold the stamps. They concluded that the inverted overprint was applied at the Government Printing Office without authorisation to sheets of genuine stamps which were not part of the Post Office stock, meaning that the overprints were forged. Boffa mentioned that the overprinting might have even been done outside the Government Printing Office, while Mifsud only agreed with the conclusion that there was no evidence of Caruana Gatto's involvement in the matter. There were gaps in the evidence collected by the committee, and it did not produce any arguments which countered various opinions that the overprints were the result of a genuine mistake, making its findings inconclusive. The committee's report was criticized in the press due to these shortcomings.

Philatelists regard the inverted overprint as a genuine error, even though its exact origins remain unknown. As of 2015, the stamp is priced at £170 mint and £500 used in the Stanley Gibbons catalogue.

== Critical reception ==
The stamps received mostly negative reactions from the public and stamp collectors upon their release. Even Caruana Dingli was dissatisfied with the way the stamps were printed, stating in the local newspaper Il Popolo di Malta on 4 August 1922 that:

After correcting the first proofs and suggesting certain artistic retouching, I regret to say, that the result still fell short of my expectations. My original was copied by hand and alterations were introduced resulting in a totally different effect from that originally intended.

Amongst other criticism, he expressed his dissatisfaction that the lighthouse in the background was remodelled to look like a beehive or the Mosta Dome. He also complained that the colours were not to his liking, and that he had not been consulted about them. He exhibited an enlarged version of his original design at the Bibliotheca in Valletta to showcase the difference in the designs.

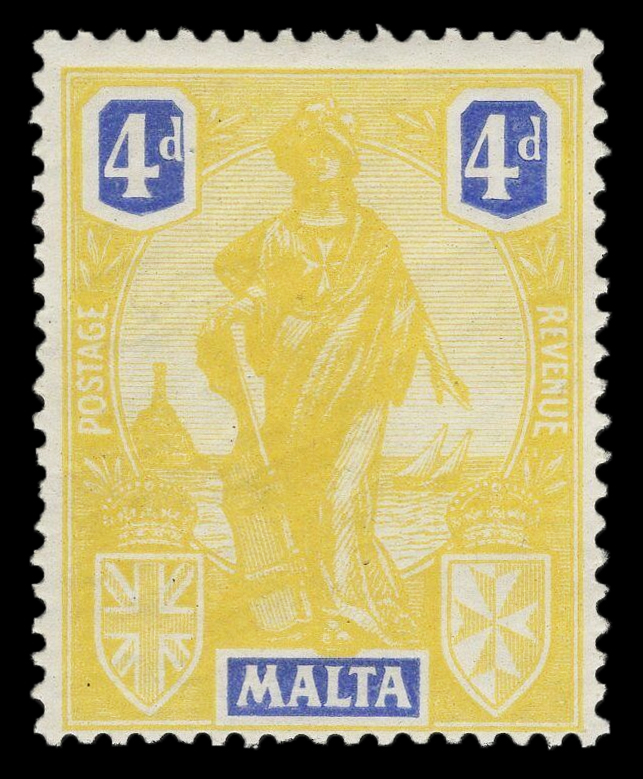
The colour scheme of the 4d was criticized when the stamps were issued

An article in The Boy's Own Paper described the issue as a "handsome set", but also mentioned the criticism aimed at the colour scheme of the 4d value in yellow and blue. This article incorrectly identified Melita as being a sea nymph. In Mekeel's Weekly Stamp News of 16 May 1927, a certain Capt. H. W. Jessop wrote that:

though not in themselves displeasing, [the stamps] did not meet with a very enthusiastic reception either from the general public or from collectors.

Criticism was also directed towards the lack of a portrait of King George V on the stamps, although the stamps were aimed at specifically manifesting Malta's newly established independence from complete British control.

The 1926 Postage overprints were widely criticized as being unnecessary, and they were unpopular both locally and among collectors.

In contrast to when it was issued, today Caruana Dingli's design is held in high esteem, and in 2011 MaltaPost stated that "it is widely considered to be one of Malta's most beautiful stamps." A 2019 article in the Stamp Magazine describes the Melita issue as "some of Malta's finest" stamp designs, but also comments on the contrast between Caruana Dingli's and Vella's Melitas, describing the latter as having "an awkward pose".

== Sale and collecting ==
In 1922–23 the Post Office recorded an increase of £1920. 19s. 9½d. in revenue when compared to the previous year. This increase was attributed to the sale of stamps to philatelists "owing to the issue of new design stamps". (Note: The statistics in the 1922 Blue Book are for the period lasting from 1 April 1922 to 31 March 1923. The only new stamps issued during this period were a ¼d surcharged stamp on 15 April, 6d and ½d Self-Government overprints on 19 and 24 April respectively, and the Melita issue between 1 and 28 August. The Melita issue was the only issue with a new design.) A massive increase of £27977. 16s. 6½d. in Post Office revenue was registered in 1925–26 when compared to 1924–25, and this was attributed to "an abnormal quantity of stamps sold to collectors for philatelic purposes" along with increased use of stamps for postal purposes. (Note: The statistics in the 1926 Blue Book are for the period lasting from 1 April 1925 to 31 March 1926. The only new postage stamps issued during this period were all from the Melita issue: the reprint of the £1 on 14 May 1925, the 2½d on 3d surcharge in December 1925, and the 2½d and 3d in new colours on 16 February 1926. In addition, there were two new sets of postage due stamps issued on 16 April and 20 July 1925.) In 1926–27, another massive increase of £24870. 8s. 2d. was attributed to "large sales of stamps overprinted "Postage"."

Due to the criticism at the colour scheme of the 4d value, that stamp was reportedly withdrawn by the postal authorities soon after it was issued. Some believed that the stamp could become a rarity and examples of it were sold for as much as 30/-. After a couple of days the stamp once again became available at post offices, and it is no longer scarcer than the other stamps in the issue. Today, the 1922–26 stamps are not rare, and the lower values up to the 2/6 are relatively cheap. The higher values are more expensive, with the most valuable stamp being the original £1 value of 1922 with a sideways watermark.

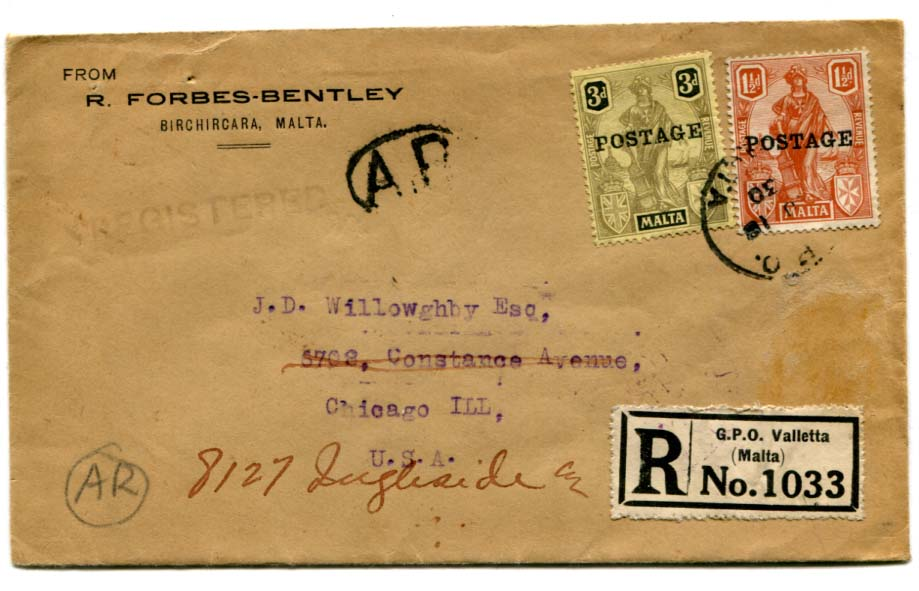
1½d and 3d Melita stamps with the "POSTAGE" overprint used on a 1930 AR registered cover to the United States. The cover was sent by Rupert Forbes-Bentley, a stamp dealer.

Although the 1926 Postage overprints were only on sale for about one week, the bulk of the stamps were sold to stamp dealers and collectors so most of them remain common. However, some values sold out soon after they were issued and stamps with the denominations of 4d, 2/-, 2/6 and 5/- remain scarce today. Since they were only in use briefly, most of the 1926 overprints are more valuable in used condition. The "POSTAGE" overprint has also been forged, particularly on the 2/- and 2/6 denominations and on the 3d with inverted overprint.

The Malta Study Circle, a group of philatelists who study Malta's stamps and postal history, has produced a number of publications relating to the Melita issue. Two study papers which related to the original 1922–26 issue and the 1926 Postage overprints were published in 1970, and they were combined into a single paper in 1972. A rewritten paper was published in 2006. The Study Circle's newsletter which is published three times a year is also entitled Melita.

== Legacy ==
The first set of post-independence Malta definitive stamps, which was issued on 7 January 1965, included an allegorical representation of Melita on the 2/6 denomination which commemorated the State of Malta. The design by Emvin Cremona depicts Melita holding a spear and a shield with Malta's 1943–64 coat of arms (including the George Cross), and she is shown sitting among ruins as if after a battle.

An allegorical figure with a pose similar to Caruana Dingli's Melita design was used on the fifth and final series of Maltese lira banknotes. These banknotes were introduced by the Central Bank of Malta on 18 September 1989, coinciding with the 25th anniversary of independence, and they had four denominations: Lm2, Lm5, Lm10 and Lm20. Another series of banknotes with the same design but with amended security features was issued on 1 June 1994. Versions with signatures of different Governors of the Central Bank were issued in 1997, 1999 and 2001, and there was also a special issue for collectors in 2000. These banknotes remained in use until Malta adopted the euro on 1 January 2008, and remained legal tender until 31 January 2008; they were demonetized ten years later on 31 January 2018.

On 2 December 2011, MaltaPost issued a miniature sheet containing a €4.16 stamp to commemorate the 90th anniversary of the establishment of Malta's Senate and Legislative Assembly. This issue depicted the £1 Melita stamp of 1922 as a stamp on stamp.

Caruana Dingli's Melita design was reused for the Melita bullion coins, a series of gold and silver bullion coins minted by the Central Bank of Malta in collaboration with Lombard Bank. The coins are minted in different sizes and denominations, and were first issued on 30 November 2018. Coins are minted annually according to demand, retaining the same design except for the year of minting.

== See also ==
- Postage stamps and postal history of Malta
