= Melita (personification) =

National personification of Malta

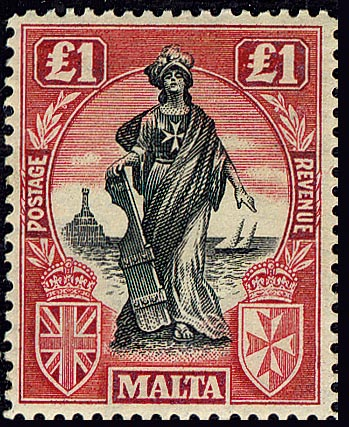
Melita depicted on a £1 stamp designed by Edward Caruana Dingli issued on 28 August 1922

Melita is a national personification of Malta. The name originated from the Punic-Roman town of Melite (Μελίτη, Melite in Ancient Greek), the ancient capital of Malta which eventually developed into the city of Mdina.

The symbolic depiction of a country as a woman called by the Latin name of that country was common in the 19th century (such as Britannia, Columbia, Germania, Hibernia and Helvetia).

== Description and origins ==
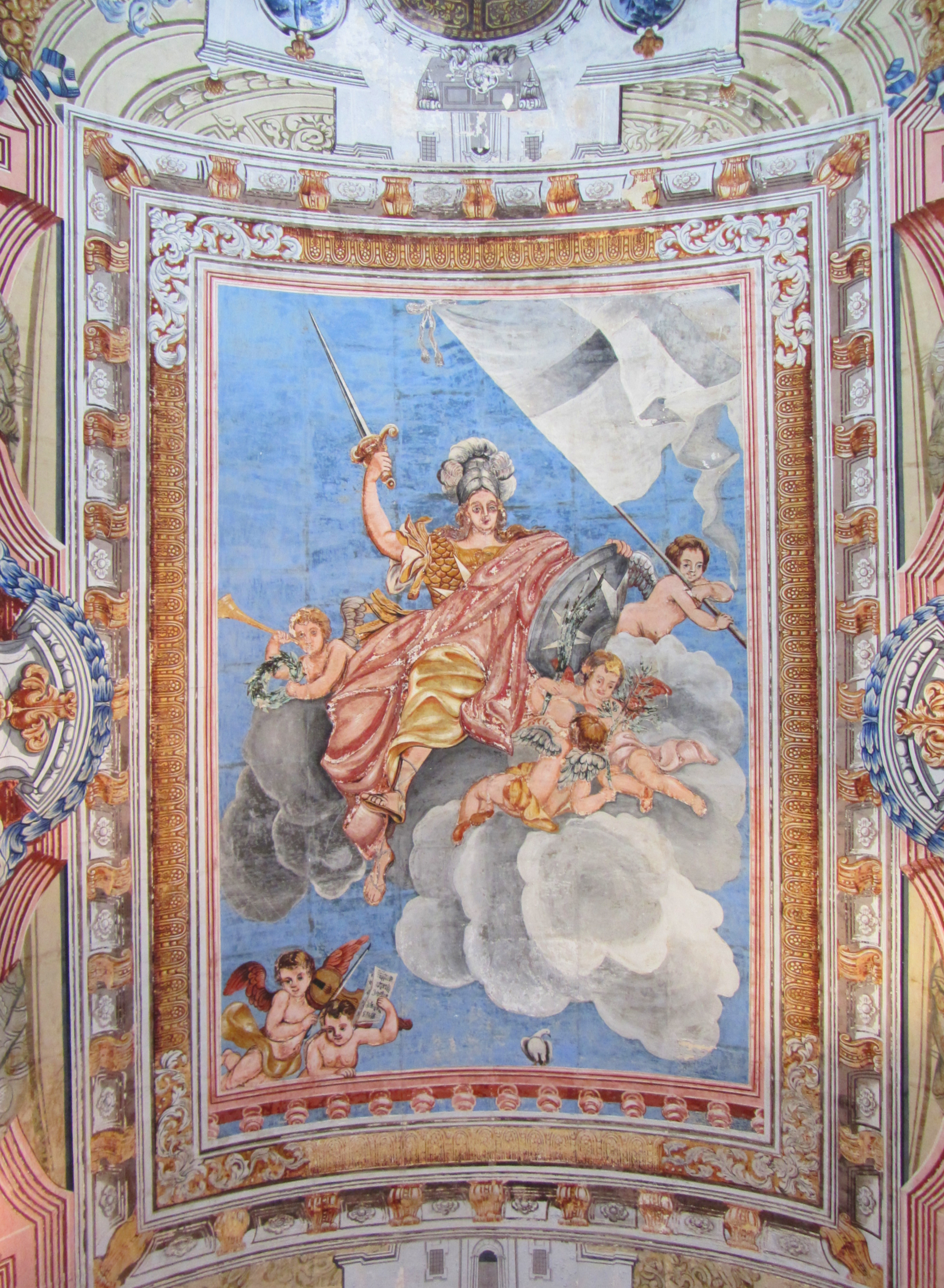
Ceiling fresco at Auberge de Provence by Nicolau Nasoni, depicting a personification of "Religion" which bears similarities with later depictions of Melita

The earliest known personification of Malta dates back to 1481. This depicts a woman holding a sceptre in one hand and the emblem of Malta in the other, and it was produced for the choir of the Mdina cathedral.

The personification of Melita is often depicted as a woman wearing military attire, prominently displaying the Maltese cross. This is said to represent Malta's strategic importance in a military and maritime context, while also reflecting the islands' Catholic traditions. This iconography is inspired by that of the Roman goddess Minerva and the allegory of fortitude in a Christian context. It also bears similarities to depictions of Britannia.

This depiction is said to have originally represented the Order of St John, which ruled Malta between the 16th and 18th centuries. An example of an allegorical painting which bears similarities to later depictions of Melita is an 18th-century fresco at Auberge de Provence by Nicolau Nasoni. The painting depicts a female figure wearing armour with a Maltese cross and holding a sword and shield, and it is said to represent the "Religion", a common nickname for the Order. After the Order's expulsion from Malta in 1798, the personification came to represent Malta itself due to the strong links between the islands' identity and the Order.

In the first half of the 20th century, a woman wearing an għonnella was sometimes used as an alternative personification of Malta distinct from Melita.

== Depiction on stamps and currency ==
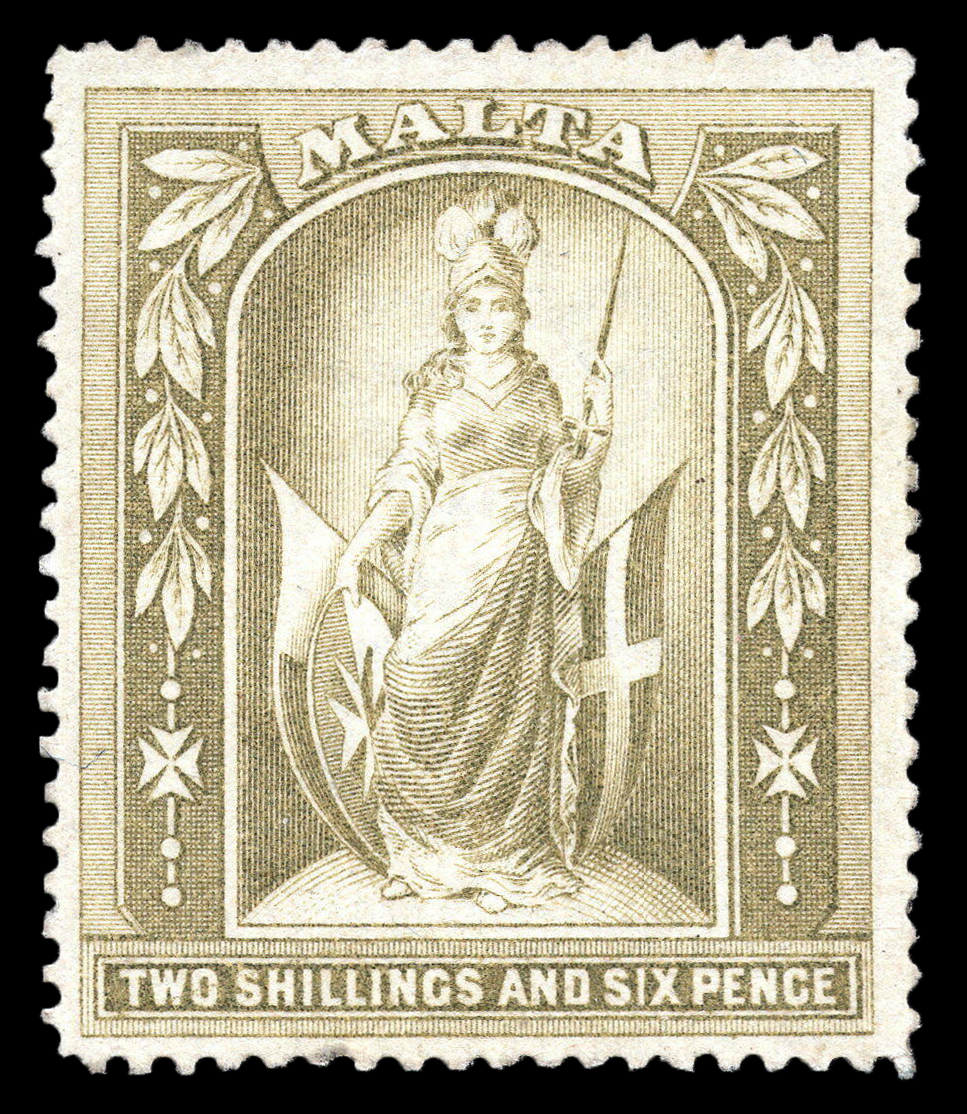
The 1899 Melita stamp

=== Stamps ===
Melita has been portrayed a number of times on Maltese postage or revenue stamps. The allegorical figure first appeared on a 2s/6d olive-grey stamp in 1899, where she was depicted holding a sword and a shield, the latter emblazoned with the Maltese cross. In the background were the flags of Malta and of the Order of St John. The designer of this stamp is not known, and it remained in use until the early 1920s, being reissued with a different watermark in 1919. Special printings of the 1899 design, sometimes in new colours or watermarks, were also issued with overprints for revenue purposes between 1902 and 1908.

Between 1922 and 1926, a series of dual-purpose postage and revenue stamps known as the Melita issue was issued to commemorate Malta's self-government. The stamps had two designs: one by Edward Caruana Dingli and the other by Gianni Vella. Caruana Dingli's design, which was used for the pence and pound values, depicts Melita as a robed and helmeted figure holding a rudder, representing Malta as being in control of her own destiny, while Vella's design shows Melita embracing Britannia, representing the link between Britain and Malta as sisters or mother and daughter.

=== Currency ===
A depiction of Melita based on Caruana Dingli's design appeared on the fifth series of Maltese lira banknotes which were in use from 1989 until Malta adopted the euro in 2008. The watermark on these and previous banknotes also shows the head of the allegorical figure Melita. The allegorical figure also appears on the Melita bullion coins minted since 2018.
