= Onionskin =

Thin type of paper

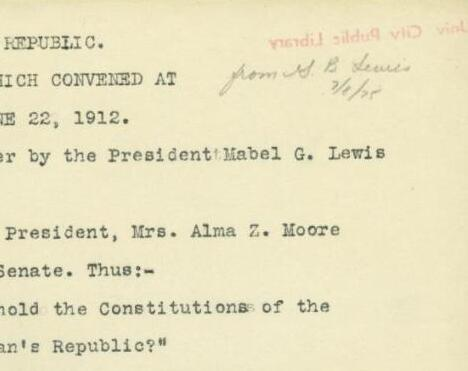
Typewritten page of canary onionskin, 1912. The translucency can be seen in the upper right corner, where the red library stamp on the obverse is visible.

Onionskin or onion skin is a thin, lightweight, strong, often translucent paper, named for its resemblance to the thin skins of onions. It is typically 25–39 g/m^{2} and may be white or canary-colored. Onionskin paper was usually used with carbon paper for typing duplicates in a typewriter where low bulk was important. It is also used for toy kites and advanced paper airplanes due to its durability for its weight, and in traditional cel animation due to its translucency.

== Description ==
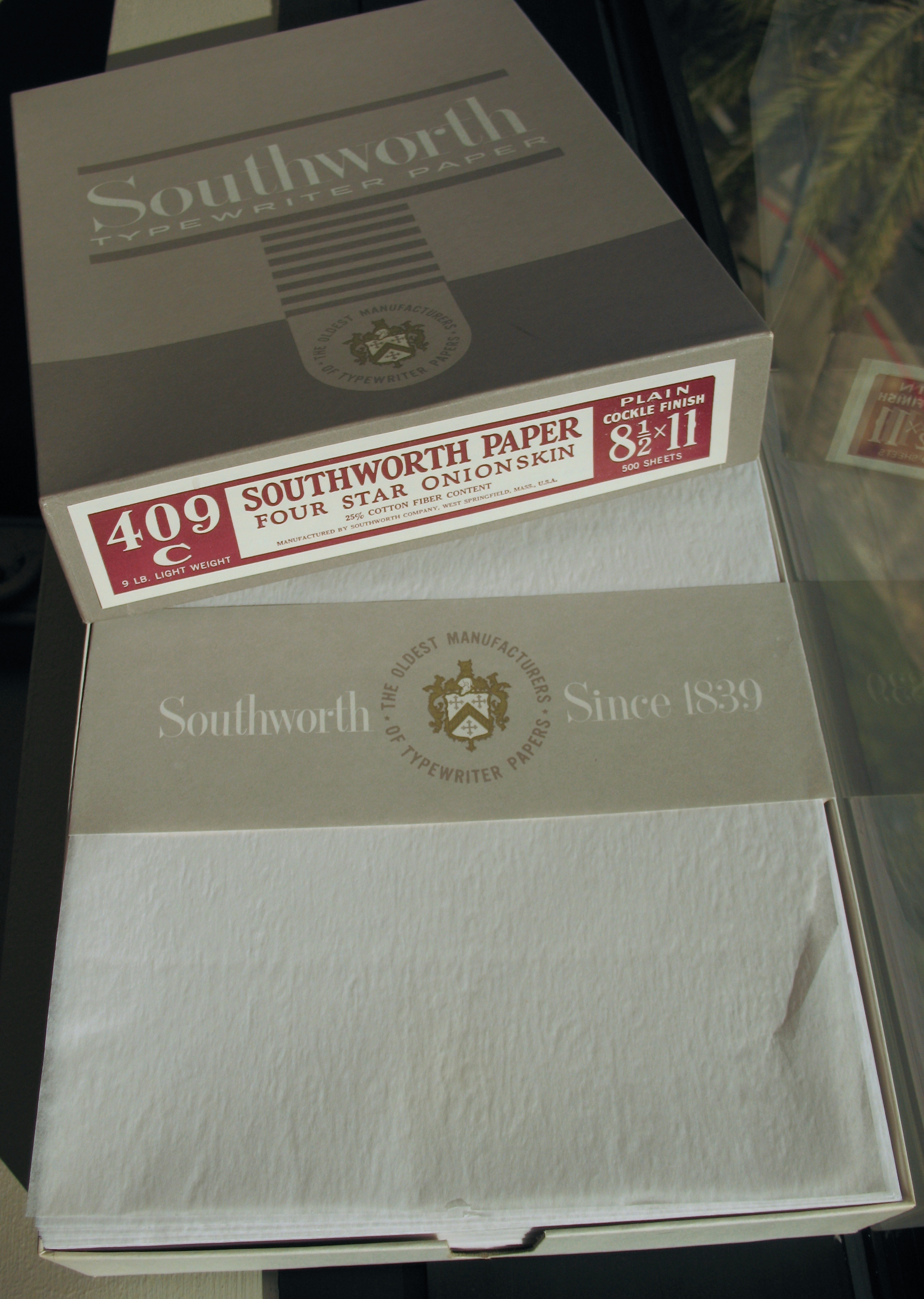
A pack of Southworth onionskin paper, with a "plain cockle finish"

Onionskin or onion skin is a thin, lightweight, strong, often translucent paper, named for its resemblance to the thin skins of onions. It is typically 25–39 g/m^{2} (9-pound basis weight in US units), and may be white or canary-colored.

== Use ==
Onionskin was usually used with carbon paper for typing duplicates in a typewriter, for permanent records where low bulk was important, or for airmail correspondence. In the typewriter era, onion skin often had a deeply textured cockle finish which allowed for easier erasure of typing mistakes, but other glazed and unglazed finishes were also available then and may be more common today.

Onionskin paper is relatively durable and lightweight due to its high content of cotton fibers. Because of these attributes and its crispness when folding, onionskin paper is one of the best papers to use for toy kites and advanced paper airplanes. Paper airplanes made from onionskin paper tend to fly very well due to their low weight and high integrity once folded.

Onionskin paper has also been regularly used in traditional cel animation. Due to its translucency, it is used as a guide in drawing the frames between key-frames. This is a process that animators refer to as in-betweening. The process of onionskinning is also used in digital animation where frames are represented by digital layers in a production.

== See also ==
- Bible paper
- India paper
