= Gianni Vella =

Former Maltese artist

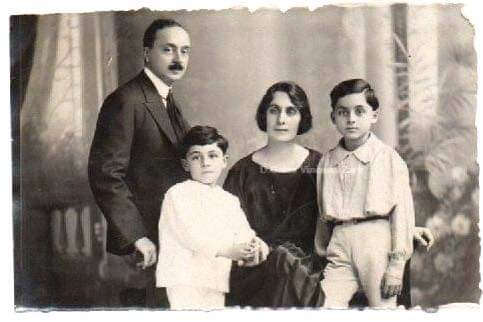
- Gianni Vella and family, ca. 1920
- Born: 9 May 1885; Cospicua, Crown Colony of Malta
- Died: 3 September 1977 (aged 92); Buġibba, Malta
- Education: British Academy; Accademia di Belle Arti di Roma
- Occupation: Painter
- Spouse: Mary Chretien
- Children: 3

Gianni Vella (9 May 1885 – 3 September 1977) was a Maltese artist. After studying in Rome, he produced many religious works which can be found in many churches in the Maltese Islands, but he also produced some secular works, including landscape paintings, cartoons and a stamp design.

== Biography ==
Gianni Vella was born in Cospicua on 9 May 1885. He started painting at a young age, producing paintings and other decorations for his hometown's Immaculate Conception feast. He was an apprentice to the Italian artist Attilo Palombi for seven years, and during this time he worked on frescoes in various churches.

Vella was eventually employed by the education department as a drawing master, and he illustrated Albert Laferla's book The Story of Man in Malta. In 1907, after being recommended by Palombi, he went to Rome to study at the British Academy and the Accademia di Belle Arti di Roma. While he was there, he won a number of prizes for his paintings and his work was exhibited in several Italian cities.

Vella returned to Malta in 1912 and opened an art studio in the capital Valletta. He produced many religious paintings and frescoes, and these can be found in many churches and chapels in the Maltese Islands. He also took commissions for private villas and houses. Throughout his career, which lasted over five decades, Vella worked in various media, including oils, watercolours and pastels.

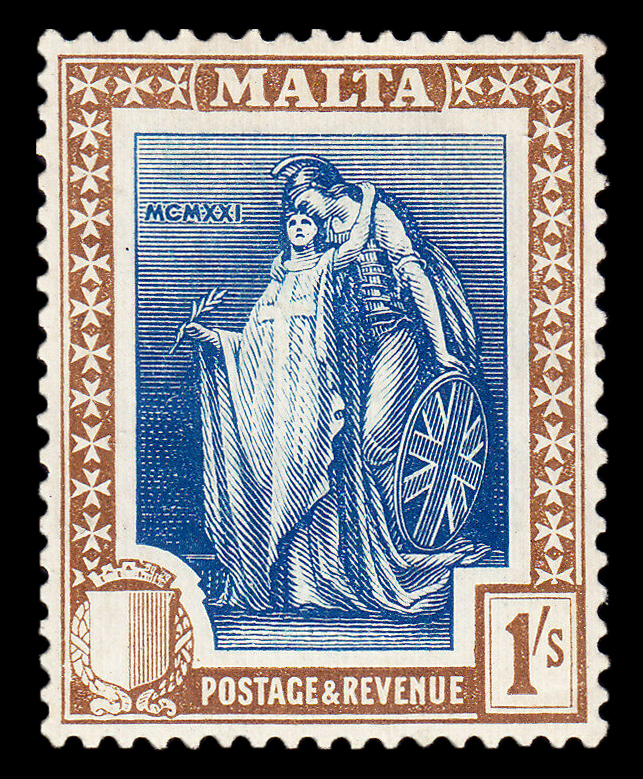
Vella's stamp design for the shilling denominations of the Melita issue

In 1921, Vella took part in a stamp design competition, and his entry was one of two designs chosen for the Melita issue of 1922. His design was used for five stamps, while the rest of the set was designed by Edward Caruana Dingli. He also produced cartoons for the satirical paper Il-Ħmara, and he designed masks for the 1927 carnival. He was a regular participant in the annual art exhibition held at the Trade Fair Grounds in Naxxar. In 1976, he was awarded a gold medal by the Malta Society of Arts, Manufacturers and Commerce.

Vella married Mary Chretien, and they had three children: Maria, Aldo and Beppe. He died on 3 September 1977 at the age of 92. That same year, a documentary on his life was broadcast on local television. An exhibition of his works was held at the National Museum of Archaeology in Valletta in 1983.

== Works ==
One of Vella's early works is Villa Borghese sotto Neve, an oil painting which won him a prize while in Rome.

Notable religious works by Vella include the Sacred Heart of Jesus at the Discalced Carmelite church in Birkirkara, some of the frescoes at the St Publius Parish Church in Floriana and decorations at the vault and apses of the Cathedral of the Assumption, Victoria. Other churches which contain works by Vella include the churches of St Augustine and St Francis in Valletta, the parish churches of Marsa, Tarxien, Għaxaq, Safi, Gżira, Naxxar, Birkirkara, Lija, Mellieħa, Żurrieq, Qala, Nadur, Xagħra, Sannat, Munxar and San Lawrenz, and various other churches and chapels around Malta and Gozo.

Some of his works can also be found at St Aloysius' College in Birkirkara and the Wignacourt Museum in Rabat.
