= India paper =

Type of paper

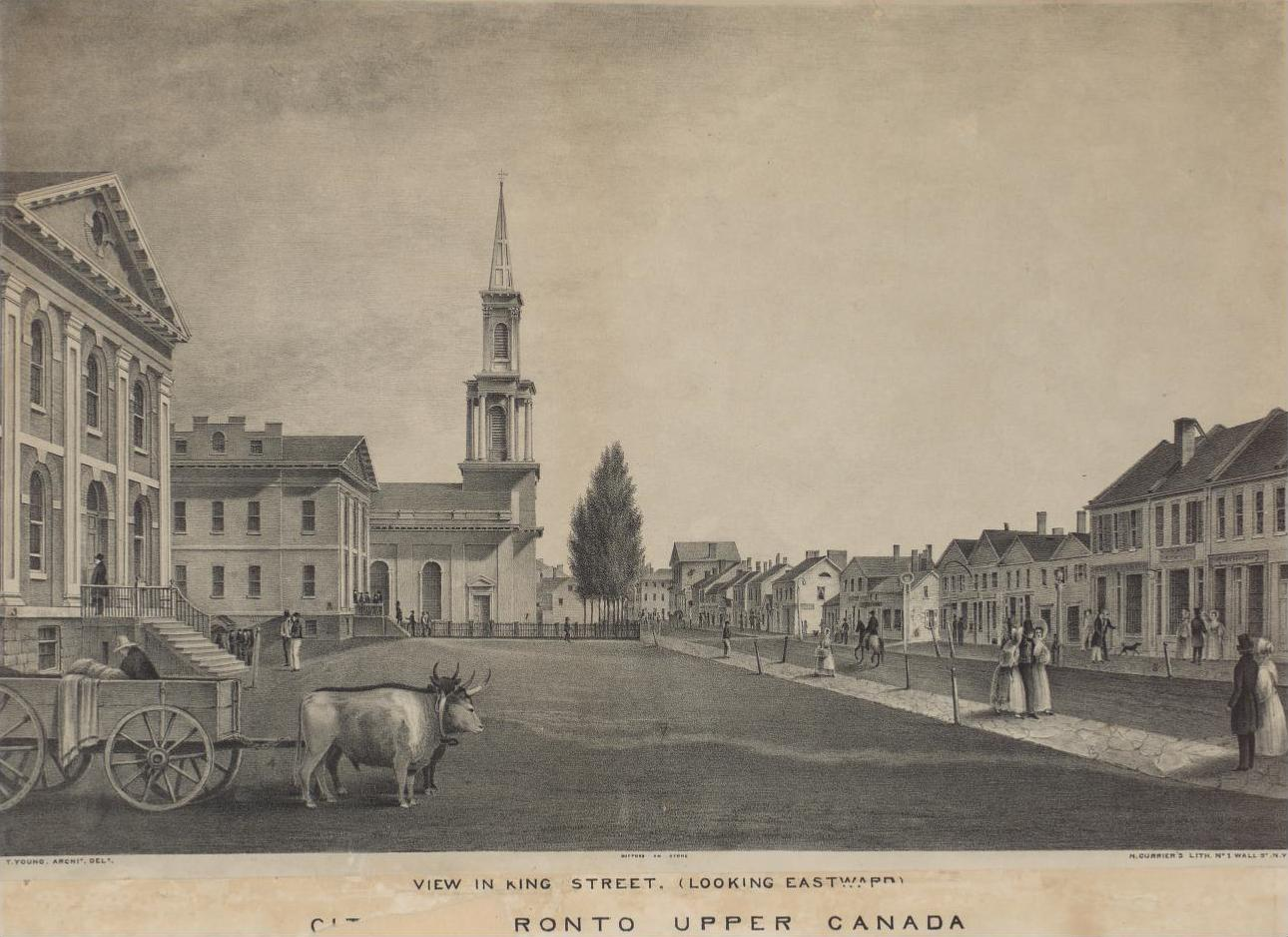
Thomas Young (d. 1860). Lithograph on stone by J. H. Bufford, printed on India paper by N. Currier, New York.

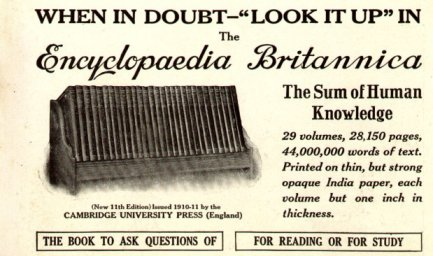
The 1911 Encyclopædia Britannica boasted of its India paper printing

India paper is a type of paper, made from 1875, based on bleached hemp and rag fibres that produced a very thin, tough opaque white paper. It became popular in particular for the printing of Bibles, and was used for printing the 1911 Encyclopædia Britannica and die proofs of postage stamps.

== Description ==
India paper is a type of paper, made from 1875, based on bleached hemp and rag fibres. It is a very thin, tough opaque white paper with a basis weight of 20 pounds (30 g/m^{2}; typical office paper is 80 g/m^{2}), yet bulks 1,000 pages to the inch (390 per centimetre).

The name arose because the paper imitated fine papers imported from the Indian subcontinent.

== History ==
It became popular in particular for the printing of Bibles, which could be made relatively small and light while remaining legible. The 1911 Encyclopædia Britannica boasted, "Printed on thin, but strong opaque India paper, each volume but one inch in thickness." The process was used particularly by the Oxford University Press and its paper suppliers.

India paper has also often been used for the printing of die proofs of postage stamps.

== See also ==
- Bible paper
- Onionskin
