= Bible paper =

Thin grade of paper used for printing books which have many pages

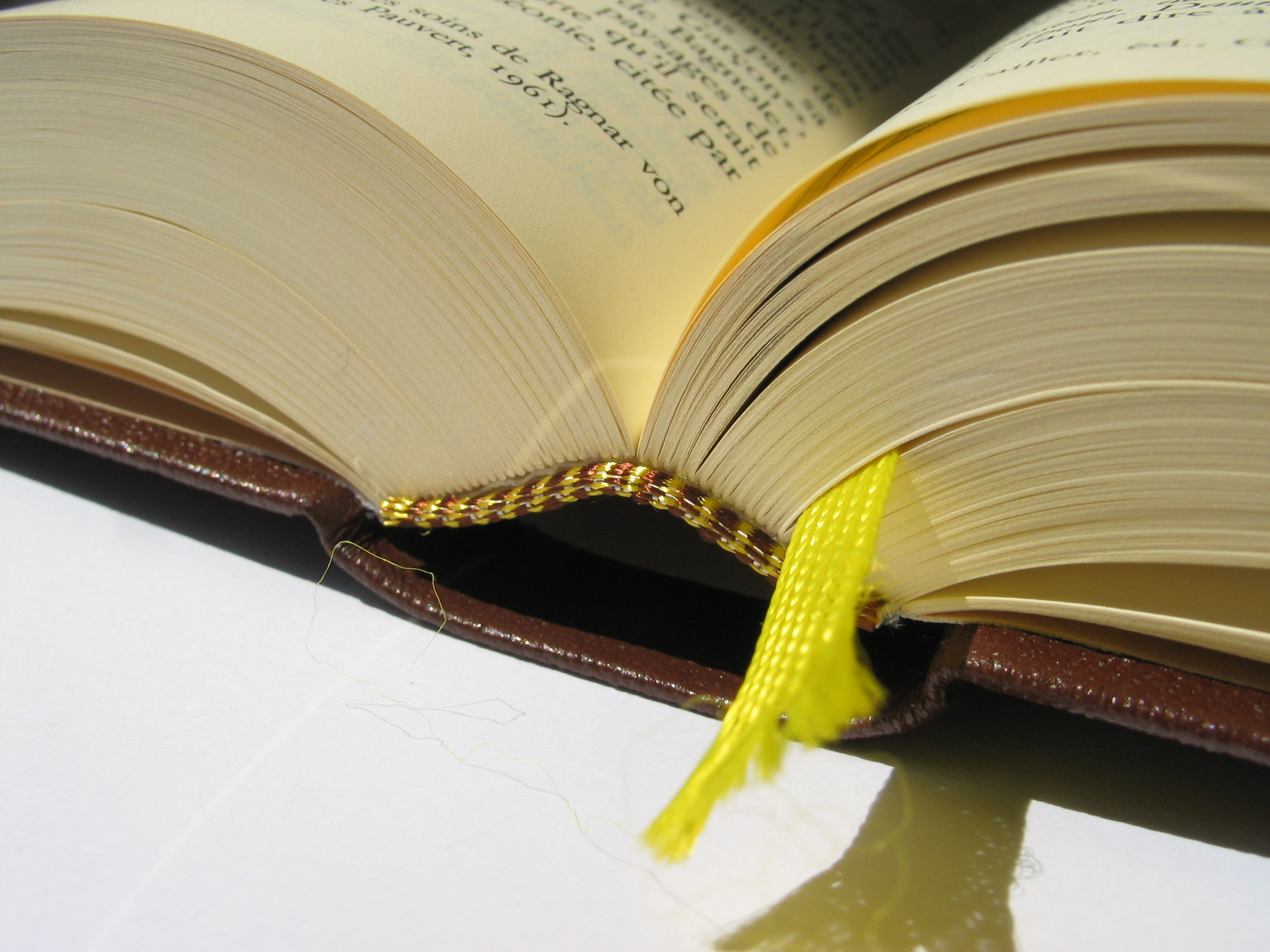
A book from the Bibliothèque de la Pléiade collection. The thinness of Bible paper allows books with a large number of pages to remain fairly compact.

Bible paper is a thin grade of paper used for printing books which have a very large number of pages, such as Bibles and dictionaries.

== Description ==
Bible paper is a thin grade of woodfree uncoated paper which often contains cotton or linen fibres to increase its strength in spite of its thinness.

It is commonly used to print Bibles and other books with hundreds or thousands of pages in more compact forms than would be possible with thicker book paper. Examples include reference works such as dictionaries, encyclopedias, and thesauruses, as well as some anthologies or collections of literature like the Bibliothèque de la Pléiade and publishers' series like the pocket edition volumes of the Collector's Library. The Norton Anthology of English Literature is known for its use of Bible paper, which an essayist for The New York Times described as "wispy cigarette paper."

Bible paper is also erroneously called India paper.

== See also ==
- India paper - very thin paper based on bleached hemp and rag fibres
