= Edward Caruana Dingli =

Edward Caruana Dingli may refer to:

- Edward Caruana Dingli (artist) (1876–1950), Maltese artist
- Edward Caruana Dingli (swimmer) (born 1992), Maltese swimmer
