= Melita (given name) =

Melita is a feminine given name which may refer to:

- Melita Aitken (1866–1945), Canadian painter and writer
- Melita Gordon, gastroenterologist
- Melita Keywood, environmental scientist
- Melita Maschmann (1918–2010), German memoirist
- Melita Norwood (1912–2005), British civil servant and Soviet spy
- Melita Ruhn (born 1965), Romanian retired gymnast
- Melita Švob (born 1931), Croatian Jewish biologist and historian
- Melita Vovk (1928–2020), Slovene painter and illustrator of children's books
