= St Francis of Assisi Church, Valletta =

Church of St Francis of Assisi
- Knisja ta' San Franġisk
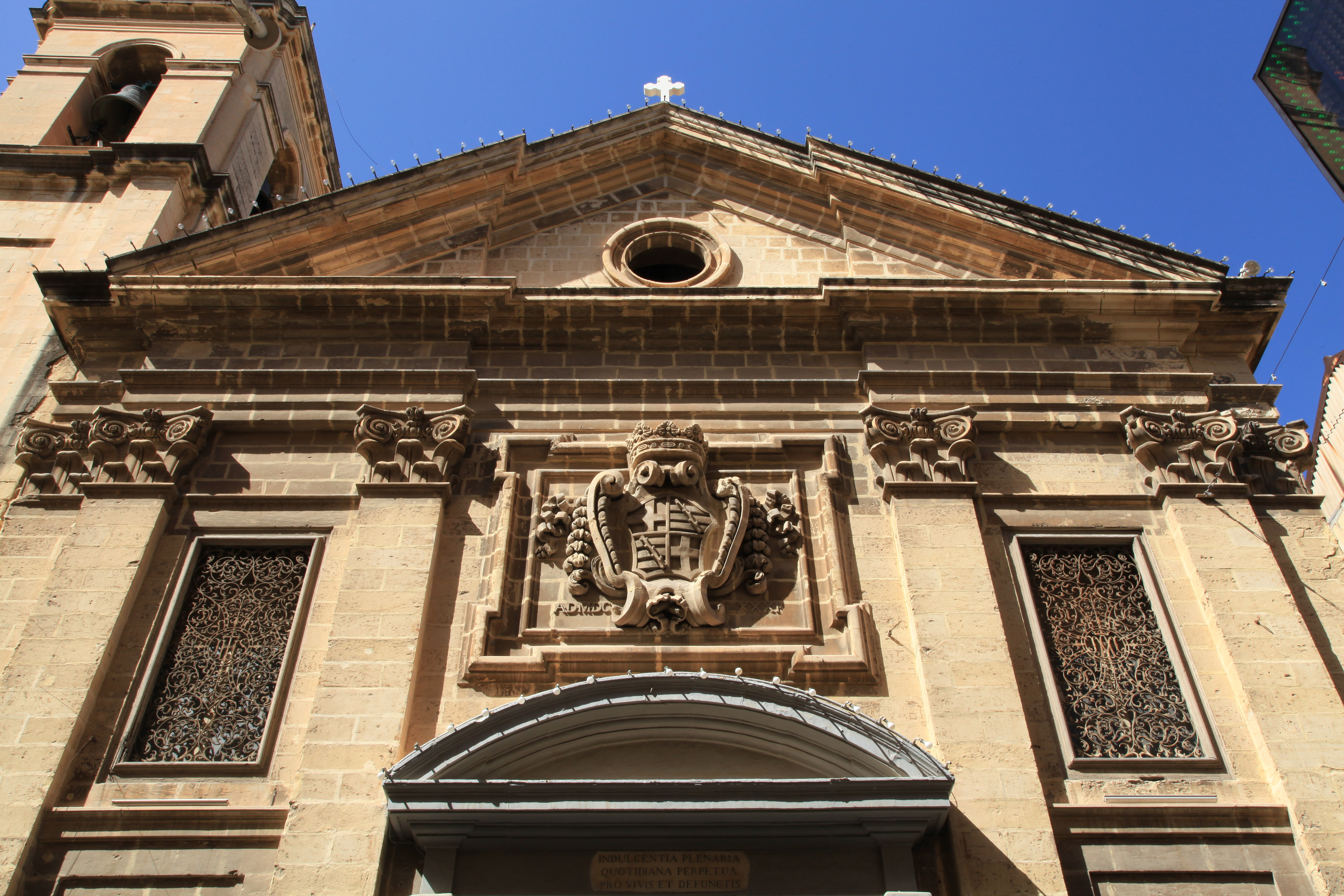

- Location in Malta
- 35°53′51″N 14°30′39″E
- Location: Valletta
- Country: Malta
- Denomination: Roman Catholic

History
- Status: Active
- Founded: 1598
- Dedication: St Francis of Assisi

Architecture
- Functional status: Conventual church
- Architectural type: Church
- Style: Baroque
- Completed: 1607

Administration
- Province: St Pauls' Franciscan Conventuals Order
- Archdiocese: Malta

Clergy
- Archbishop: Charles Scicluna
- Rector: George Micallef
- Vicar: Joseph Bugeja

St Francis of Assisi Church, dedicated to St Francis of Assisi (Maltese: San Franġisk t'Assisi), in Valletta (the capital city of Malta), was built in 1598 and was completed by 1607.

== History ==
After a few decades, however, the church developed structural defects and in 1681 it was built anew through the "munificence" of Grand Master Gregorio Carafa, whose coat of arms adorns the façade.

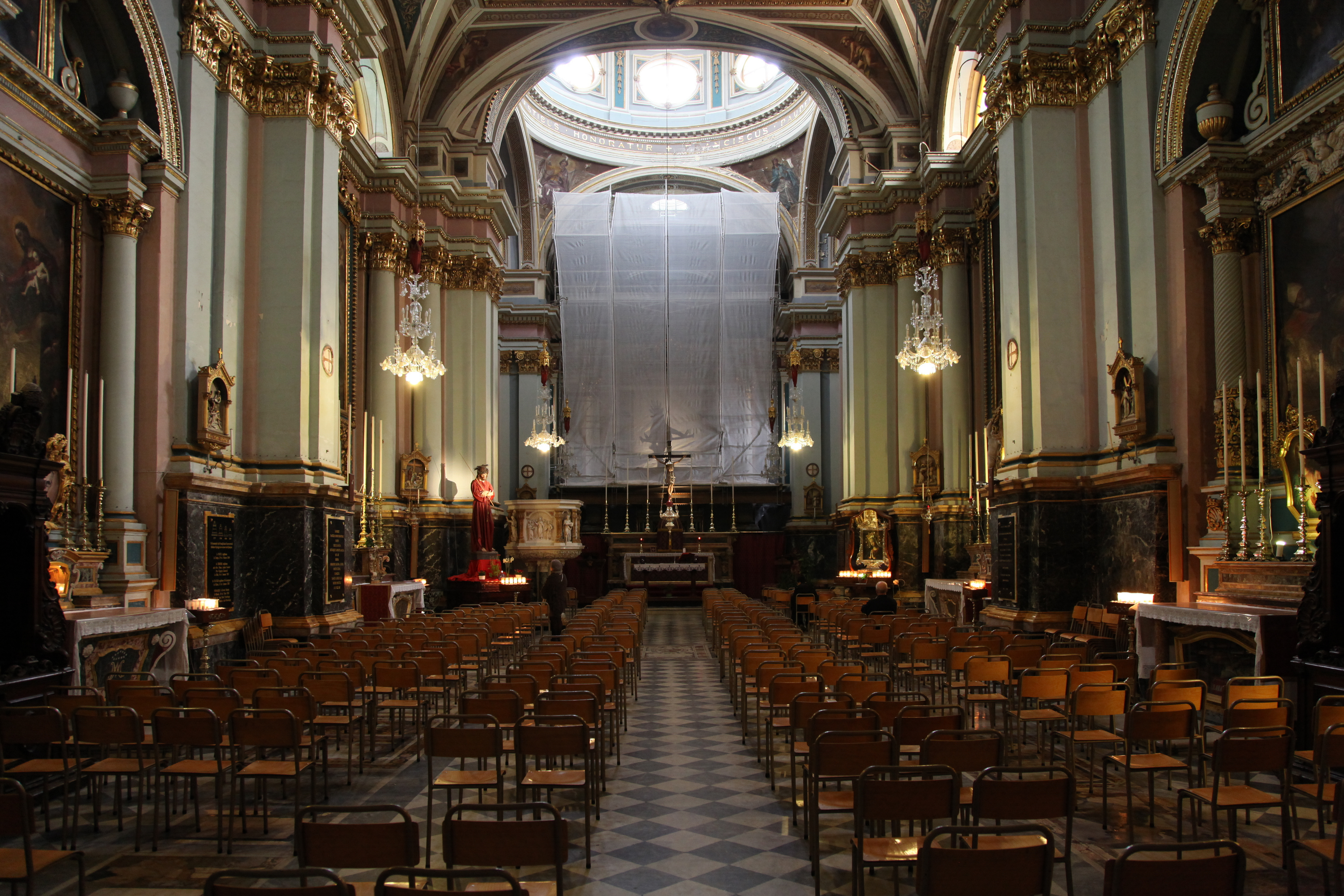
Interior of the church

The church was enlarged in the 1920s following plans by Emanuel Borg, which also included a dome. This implied the removal of some of the frescos by Giuseppe Calì, which were replaced with others by Gianni Vella.

However the church still hosts precious works of art including paintings by Mattia Preti, Pietro Gagliardi and Filippo Paladini, as well as the titular statue of St Francis.

The church building is listed on the National Inventory of the Cultural Property of the Maltese Islands.

== See also ==
- Culture of Malta
- History of Malta
- List of Churches in Malta
- Religion in Malta
