= Melita bullion coins =

Maltese silver and gold coins, 2018–present

Melita Gold
- Malta
- Value: €10, €25, €50 and €100 (face value)
- Mass: €10: 3.11 g (0.100 ozt) €25: 7.77 g (0.250 ozt) €50: 15.55 g (0.500 ozt) €100: 31.10 g (1.000 ozt)
- Diameter: €10: 16 mm (0.63 in) €25: 22 mm (0.87 in) €50: 27 mm (1.1 in) €100: 34 mm (1.3 in)
- Thickness: €10: 0.8 mm (0.031 in) €25: 1.06 mm (0.042 in) €50: 1.40 mm (0.055 in) €100: 1.78 mm (0.070 in)
- Edge: Milled/Reeded
- Composition: 99.9% Au
- Years of minting: 2018–present

Obverse
- Design: Coat of arms of Malta
- Design date: 2018

Reverse
- Design: Melita
- Design date: 2018

Melita Silver
- Malta
- Value: €10 (face value)
- Mass: 311 g (10.0 ozt)
- Diameter: 79.5 mm (3.13 in)
- Thickness: 6 mm (0.24 in)
- Edge: Flat
- Composition: 99.9% Ag
- Years of minting: 2021

Obverse
- Design: Coat of arms of Malta
- Design date: 2021

Reverse
- Design: Melita
- Design date: 2021

The Melita bullion coins are a series of silver and gold bullion coins issued by the Central Bank of Malta in collaboration with Lombard Bank since 2018. They exist in four different euro denominations and are legal tender in Malta. The coins depict the national personification Melita, and their design is based on Edward Caruana Dingli's Melita issue postage and revenue stamps of 1922–1926.

== Design ==
On the reverse, the coins depict Melita, the national personification of Malta. The design is based on the Melita issue postage and revenue stamps of 1922–26, which were designed by the artist Edward Caruana Dingli. The stamps had been designed to commemorate the Malta's new status as a self-governing colony following a new constitution in 1921, and Melita is depicted as a robed helmeted figure holding a rudder, representing Malta as being in control of her own destiny.

On the obverse, the coins depict the coat of arms of Malta.

== Production and release ==
The Melita Gold bullion coins exist in the denominations of €10, €25, €50 and €100, and they are legal tender in Malta. Each denomination has different dimensions and weight. The coins are issued by the Central Bank of Malta in collaboration with Lombard Bank, and they are minted by PAMP S.A. in Switzerland. Their composition makes them some of the purest gold bullion coins available in the world.

Three denominations (€25, €50 and €100) were first issued on 29 or 30 November 2018. They are intended both for investors and for coin collectors, and they are sold according to the international gold price. They are issued in sealed cards, and each coin has a unique profile which allows it to be authenticated using PAMP S.A.'s security system. The initial issue of 2018 was limited, and later coins were minted according to demand, so the number struck each year varies. A fourth denomination (€10) was added in 2021.

Melita Silver coins were introduced in November 2021, also with a denomination of €10.

== Gold mintage figures ==
Year	€10	€25	€50	€100	Notes and references
2018	n/a	Undisclosed	Undisclosed	Undisclosed	Maximum mintage not disclosed. Cased set of three coins limited to 100 sets.
2019	n/a	n/a	n/a	400	
2020	n/a	n/a	n/a	300	
2021	Undisclosed	Undisclosed	Undisclosed	Undisclosed	
2022	Undisclosed	Undisclosed	Undisclosed	Undisclosed	
2023	Undisclosed	Undisclosed	Undisclosed	Undisclosed	
2024	Undisclosed	Undisclosed	Undisclosed	Undisclosed	
2025	Undisclosed	Undisclosed	Undisclosed	Undisclosed	
2026	Undisclosed	Undisclosed	Undisclosed	Undisclosed	

== Silver mintage figures ==
Year	€10	Notes and references
2021	500	
