= Melito (disambiguation) =

Melito of Sardis (died c. 180) was a Christian apologist and saint.

Melito may also refer to the following places in Italy:

- Melito (river), an Italian river that empties into the Ionian Sea
- Melito di Napoli, a municipality of the Province of Naples, Campania
- Melito di Porto Salvo, a municipality of the Province of Reggio Calabria, Calabria
- Melito Irpino, a municipality of the Province of Avellino, Campania
- Melito (Prignano Cilento), a hamlet of Prignano Cilento, Campania
- Melito's canon, the biblical canon attributed to Melito of Sardis

== See also ==
- Melita (disambiguation)
- Melite, spouse of Euripides
- Meliti, a village in the Florina regional unit, Greece
- Miletus, an ancient Greek city on the western coast of Anatolia
