= Trinity Church, Marsa =

Parish Church of the Holy Trinity
- Il-Knisja Parrokjali tat-Trinita Qaddisa
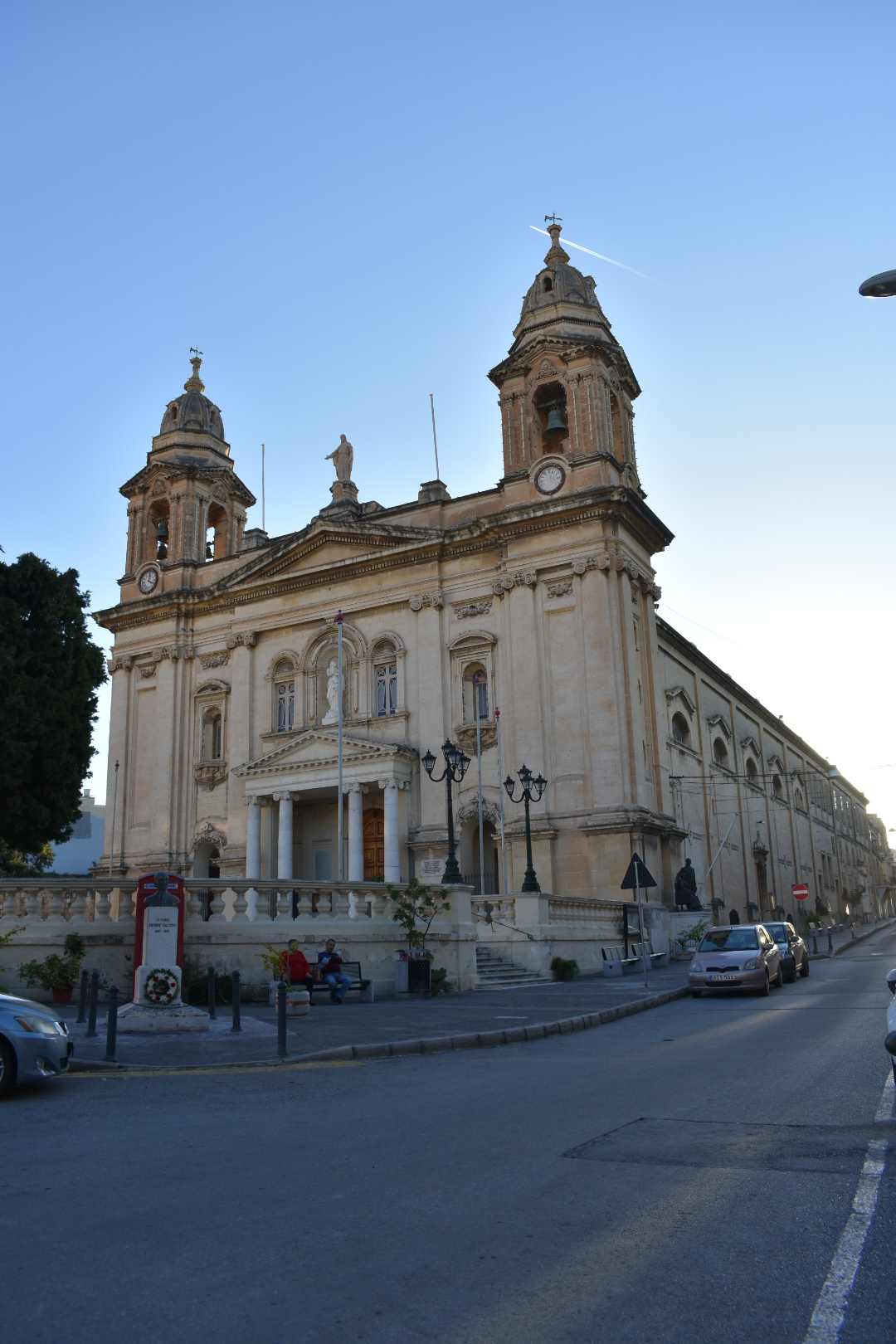
- The church in 2017
- Parish Church of the Holy Trinity
- 35°52′58.2″N 14°29′39.3″E
- Location: Marsa, Malta
- Denomination: Roman Catholic
- Website: marsaparish.blogspot.com.mt

History
- Status: Active
- Founded: October 20, 1909
- Founder: Lorenzo Balbi
- Dedication: Holy Trinity
- Consecrated: 19 April 1913

Architecture
- Functional status: Parish church
- Architect: Giovanni Domenico Debono
- Architectural type: Church
- Completed: 1913

Administration
- Archdiocese: Malta
- Parish: Marsa

Clergy
- Rector: Leonard Falzon

The Church of the Holy Trinity or simply Trinity Church is a Roman Catholic Parish church located in Marsa, Malta.

== History ==
The foundation stone of Trinity church was laid on Sunday, October 20, 1909. The building of the church was entirely financed by benefactors Lorenzo Balbi and his wife Carmela née Ozzini, a wealthy childless couple from Valletta. The church was built on designs by Giovanni Domenico Debono with the master builder, Michele Mifsud.

The construction of the church took 2 years and 9 months to be completed. The total cost amounted to an estimated cost of £7000. On April 19, 1913 the church was officially opened and declared a parish. The church was blessed by the General Vicar of the Diocese of Malta, Monsignor Luigi Attard, and the deputy of the Archbishop of Malta, Pietro Pace. The parish church was entrusted to the care of the Capuchin Friars.
