= Debbie Caruana Dingli =

Maltese painter (born 1962)

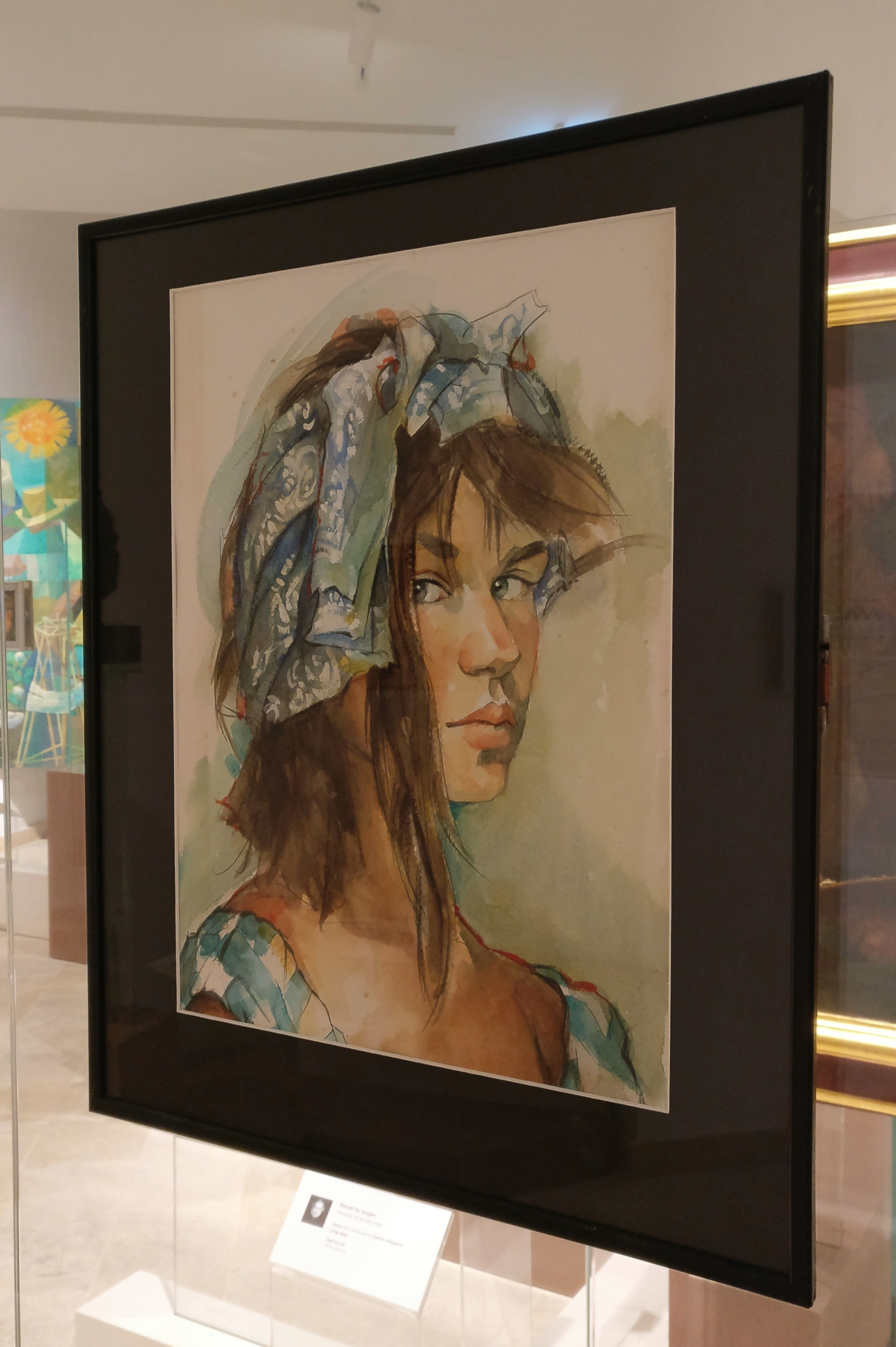
- 'Awtoritratt', Self-Portrait, 1985, Watercolour on paper, exhibited permanently at MUŻA
- Born: March 3, 1962 (age 64)
- Relatives: Edward Caruana Dingli (great uncle)

Debbie Caruana Dingli (born 3 March 1962) is a Maltese painter.

== Early and personal life ==
Debbie Caruana Dingli was born on 3 March 1962 to Mario and Bertha née Curmi. Born into an artistic family, she represents the fourth generation of artists in her family, with her grandfather Robert Caruana Dingli and great-uncle Edward Caruana Dingli being amongst the most notable 20th-century Maltese artists. She started formal art tuition at the Convent of the Sacred Heart in St Julians under Margaret Chircop. She later graduated from the Malta government school of art where she was under the tutelage of Harry Alden. She was later awarded a diploma in Cartooning by the International Correspondence School in the UK. She hails from Sliema but resides in Siggiewi.

In May 2016, she was involved in a major car accident in which she sustained several serious injuries, leaving her unable to paint using her right hand.

== Art career ==
Debbie Caruana Dingli's first solo exhibition was in 1985 and was held at the invitation of the Museum of Fine Arts in Malta. She was the first female artist to have a Bank of Valletta retrospective dedicated to her. The exhibition showcased a cross-section of her works spanning three decades. A watercolour work of hers was presented to Her Royal Majesty Queen Elizabeth and Prince Philip the Duke of Edinburgh during a State visit to Malta in November 2005 and now forms part of the Royal Collection Trust. She has held seven solo exhibitions, with themes spanning from the environment, animals and their welfare, to portraits. She is considered one of Malta's leading watercolour portraitists.
