= The Collector's Library =

Literature Collection by Pan Macmillan

- Parent company: Pan Macmillan (2015-present)
- Founded: 2003
- Founder: Marcus Clapham, Clive Reynard and Ken Webb
- Country of origin: United Kingdom
- Headquarters location: London
- Publication types: Books
- Fiction genres: Classic literature
- Official website: www.panmacmillan.com/mcl

In August 2003, CRW Publishing launched The Collector's Library series of some of the world's most notable literary works. Each volume is book size octodecimo, or 150 x 93 mm, printed in hardback, on high-quality paper, bound in real cloth, and contains a dust jacket. The series was republished by Barnes and Noble for the US market. By October 2005, fifty-nine volumes had been printed. In 2015, The Collector's Library was acquired by Pan Macmillan.

== Titles ==
Titles published under the Collector's Library series 2003-2015
ISBN	Author	Title	Series
9781907360558	A. E. Housman	A Shropshire Lad	Collector's Library
9781909621299	A. P. Herbert	The Secret Battle	Collector's Library
9781904919810	Aesop	Aesop's Fables	Collector's Library
9781909621237	Aesop	Aesop's Fables	Collector's Library in Colour
9781904919094	Alexander Murray	Who's Who in Myth & Legend	The Collector’s Library of Myth and Legend
9781904633365	Alexandre Dumas	The Count of Monte Cristo	Collector's Library
9781909621183	Alexandre Dumas	The Three Musketeers	Collector's Library
9781904919629	Alexis de Tocqueville	Democracy in America	The Collector’s Library of Essential Thinkers
9781905716418	Anna Sewell	Black Beauty	Collector's Library
9781905716036	Anne Brontë	The Tenant of Wildfell Hall	Collector's Library
9781907360862	Anthony Trollope	Barchester Towers	Collector's Library
9781909621077	Anthony Trollope	The Warden	Collector's Library
9781907360015	Antoine de Saint-Exupéry	The Little Prince	Collector's Library
9781907360374	Antoine de Saint-Exupéry	The Little Prince	Collector's Library in Colour
9781904919117	Aristotle	Selections From	The Collector’s Library of Essential Thinkers
9781905716708	Aristotle	Selections From	Collector's Library
9781904919698	Arthur Conan Doyle	A Study in Scarlet and The Sign of the Four	Collector's Library
9781905716661	Arthur Conan Doyle	Complete Illustrated Sherlock Holmes	Collector's Library Omnibus Editions
9781904919728	Arthur Conan Doyle	Sherlock Holmes 6	Boxset
9781909621282	Arthur Conan Doyle	Sherlock Holmes: The Dark Mysteries	Collector's Library
9781904633358	Arthur Conan Doyle	The Adventures of Sherlock Holmes	Collector's Library
9781905716555	Arthur Conan Doyle	The Best of Sherlock Holmes	Collector's Library
9781904633686	Arthur Conan Doyle	The Casebook of Sherlock Holmes	Collector's Library
9781904633952	Arthur Conan Doyle	The Complete Sherlock Holmes	Collector's Library Editions
9781907360459	Arthur Conan Doyle	The Complete Sherlock Holmes	Collector's Library Editions
9781904633723	Arthur Conan Doyle	The Hound of the Baskervilles and The Valley of Fear	Collector's Library
9781904919704	Arthur Conan Doyle	The Memoirs of Sherlock Holmes	Collector's Library
9781904919711	Arthur Conan Doyle	The Return of Sherlock Holmes & His Last Bow	Collector's Library
9781904633143	Bram Stoker	Dracula	Collector's Library
9781905716371	Brontë Sisters	Brontë Sisters	Boxset
9781904919742	Brontë Sisters	The Complete Novels	Collector's Library Editions
9781907360480	Brontë Sisters	The Complete Novels	Collector's Library Editions
9781909621169	Carlo Collodi	Pinocchio	Collector's Library
9781904633785	Charles Darwin	The Origin of Species	Collector's Library
9781907360725	Charles Dickens	A Christmas Carol	Collector's Library in Colour
9781904633693	Charles Dickens	A Christmas Carol and two other Christmas Books	Collector's Library
9781904633068	Charles Dickens	A Tale of Two Cities	Collector's Library
9781904919971	Charles Dickens	Bleak House	Collector's Library
9781905716487	Charles Dickens	Charles Dickens 3	Boxset
9781905716364	Charles Dickens	Charles Dickens 6	Boxset
9781904633839	Charles Dickens	David Copperfield	Collector's Library
9781905716548	Charles Dickens	Ghost Stories	Collector's Library
9781904633075	Charles Dickens	Great Expectations	Collector's Library
9781905716654	Charles Dickens	Great Illustrated Novels	Collector's Library Omnibus Editions
9781905716388	Charles Dickens	Hard Times	Collector's Library
9781904633846	Charles Dickens	Nicholas Nickleby	Collector's Library
9781904633082	Charles Dickens	Oliver Twist	Collector's Library
9781905716470	Charles Dickens	The Greatest Novels	Collector's Library Editions
9781907360497	Charles Dickens	The Greatest Novels	Collector's Library Editions
9781907360282	Charles Dickens	The Pickwick Papers	Collector's Library
9781904633037	Charlotte Brontë	Jane Eyre	Collector's Library
9781904919643	Confucius & Lao Tzu	Selected Writings	The Collector’s Library of Essential Thinkers
9781904919681	D. H. Lawrence	Lady Chatterley's Lover	Collector's Library
9781904919674	D. H. Lawrence	Sons and Lovers	Collector's Library
9781904919650	D. H. Lawrence	The Rainbow	Collector's Library
9781904919667	D. H. Lawrence	Women in Love	Collector's Library
9781905716067	Daniel Defoe	Robinson Crusoe	Collector's Library
9781907360190	Daniel Defoe	Robinson Crusoe	Collector's Library
9781909621060	Dashiell Hammett	The Maltese Falcon	Collector's Library
9781909621176	David Davies	Classic Crime Stories	Collector's Library
9781907360275	David Davies	Classic Tales of the Macabre	Collector's Library
9781905716821	David Davies	Irish Ghost Stories	Collector's Library
9781907360695	David Davies	Spinechillers: Tales for Halloween and Other Dark Nights	Collector's Library
9781907360688	David Davies	Vintage Detective Stories	Collector's Library
9781909621114	Dodie Smith	I Capture the Castle	Collector's Library
9781907360718	E. M. Forster	The Machine Stops and Other Stories	Collector's Library
9781905716104	E. Nesbit	The Railway Children	Collector's Library
9781904919773	Edgar Allan Poe	Collected Stories and Poems	Collector's Library Editions
9781905716647	Edgar Allan Poe	Collected Stories and Poems	Collector's Library Omnibus Editions
9781907360527	Edgar Allan Poe	Collected Stories and Poems	Collector's Library Editions
9781904633419	Edgar Allan Poe	Tales & Poems	Collector's Library
9781904633136	Edgar Allan Poe	Tales of Mystery & Imagination	Collector's Library
9781904633648	Edith Wharton	The Age of Innocence	Collector's Library
Unknown	Edward Gibbon	The Decline and Fall of the Roman Empire	Collector's Library Editions
9781905716586	Edward Gibbon	The Decline and Fall of the Roman Empire	Collector's Library Editions
9781905716494	Elizabeth Gaskell	Cranford	Collector's Library
9781907360794	Elizabeth Gaskell	North and South	Collector's Library
9781904633044	Emily Brontë	Wuthering Heights	Collector's Library
9781907360671	Erich Maria Remarque	All Quiet on the Western Front	Collector's Library
9781905716456	Erskine Childers	The Riddle of the Sands	Collector's Library
9781907360732	F. Scott Fitzgerald	Scott Fitzgerald 5	Boxset
9781907360565	F. Scott Fitzgerald	Tales of the Jazz Age	Collector's Library
9781907360299	F. Scott Fitzgerald	Tender is the Night	Collector's Library
9781907360305	F. Scott Fitzgerald	The Beautiful and Damned	Collector's Library
9781907360756	F. Scott Fitzgerald	The Great Gatsby	Collector's Library
9781904919483	F. Scott Fitzgerald	The Great Gatsby & The Diamond as Big as the Ritz	Collector's Library
9781907360701	F. Scott Fitzgerald	This Side of Paradise	Collector's Library
9781909621022	Ford Madox Ford	The Good Soldier	Collector's Library
9781905716043	Frances Hodgson Burnett	A Little Princess	Collector's Library
9781904633310	Frances Hodgson Burnett	The Secret Garden	Collector's Library
9781907360336	Franz Kafka	The Trial	Collector's Library
9781909621039	Frederick Forsyth	The Day of the Jackal	Collector's Library
9781904919636	Friedrich Nietzsche	Selections From	The Collector’s Library of Essential Thinkers
9781904633341	Fyodor Dostoevsky	Crime and Punishment	Collector's Library
9781904633051	G. K. Chesterton	Father Brown: Selected Stories	Collector's Library
9781904633792	Gaston Leroux	The Phantom of the Opera	Collector's Library
9781904919759	Geoffrey Chaucer	The Kelmscott Chaucer	Collector's Library Editions
9781907360510	Geoffrey Chaucer	The Kelmscott Chaucer	Collector's Library Editions
9781905716432	George and Weedon Grossmith	The Diary of a Nobody	Collector's Library
9781905716074	George Eliot	Middlemarch	Collector's Library
9781904919575	George Eliot	Silas Marner	Collector's Library
9781907360572	Gerald Durrell	My Family and Other Animals	Collector's Library
9781909621046	Graham Greene	Brighton Rock	Collector's Library
9781909621343	Graham Greene	Our Man in Havana	Collector's Library
9781909621091	Graham Greene	The Ministry of Fear	Collector's Library
9781907360312	Graham Greene	The Third Man and Other Stories	Collector's Library
9781904633099	Gustave Flaubert	Madame Bovary	Collector's Library
9781909621251	Gustave Flaubert	Madame Bovary	Collector's Library
9781909621213	Gwen Raverat	Period Piece	Collector's Library
9781904919032	H. A. Guerber	Myths of Greece and Rome	The Collector’s Library of Myth and Legend
9781907360251	Hans Christian Andersen	Best Fairy Tales	Collector's Library
9781904919469	Hans Christian Andersen	The Illustrated Tales	Collector's Library Editions
9781904633488	Harriet Beecher Stowe	Uncle Tom's Cabin	Collector's Library
9781905716425	Hector Hugh Munro (Saki)	The Best of Saki (The Best Short Stories)	Collector's Library
9781904633457	Henry David Thoreau	Walden	Collector's Library
9781905716081	Henry Fielding	Tom Jones	Collector's Library
9781904633808	Henry James	The Portrait of a Lady	Collector's Library
9781907360329	Henry James	The Turn of the Screw and Owen Wingrave	Collector's Library
9781904633778	Herman Melville	Moby-Dick	Collector's Library
9781904633389	Homer	The Iliad	Collector's Library
9781904633372	Homer	The Odyssey	Collector's Library
9781905716401	J. M. Barrie	Peter Pan	Collector's Library
9781907360923	J. M. Barrie	Peter Pan	Collector's Library in Colour
9781904633679	Jack London	The Call of the Wild & White Fang	Collector's Library
9781904633709	Jacob and Wilhelm Grimm	Grimms' Fairy Tales	Collector's Library
9781909621305	Jacob and Wilhelm Grimm	Grimms' Fairy Tales	Collector's Library in Colour
9781904633754	James Fenimore Cooper	The Last of the Mohicans	Collector's Library
9781904919544	James Joyce	A Portrait of the Artist as a Young Man	Collector's Library
9781904919537	James Joyce	Dubliners	Collector's Library
9781905716630	Jane Austen	Complete Illustrated Novels	Collector's Library Omnibus Editions
9781904633938	Jane Austen	Complete Novels	Collector's Library Editions
9781905716326	Jane Austen	Complete Novels	Collector’s Library Editions in Colour
9781905716760	Jane Austen	Complete Novels	Collector’s Library Editions in Colour
9781907360428	Jane Austen	Complete Novels	Collector's Library Editions
9781904633006	Jane Austen	Emma	Collector's Library
9781905716753	Jane Austen	Emma & Pride and Prejudice	Boxset
9781904633518	Jane Austen	Jane Austen 6	Boxset
9781904633297	Jane Austen	Mansfield Park	Collector's Library
9781904633303	Jane Austen	Northanger Abbey	Collector's Library
9781904633280	Jane Austen	Persuasion	Collector's Library
9781904633013	Jane Austen	Pride and Prejudice	Collector's Library
9781907360879	Jane Austen	Pride and Prejudice	Collector's Library in Colour
9781907360053	Jane Austen	Sanditon, Lady Susan & The History of England	Collector's Library
9781904633020	Jane Austen	Sense and Sensibility	Collector's Library
9781904919612	Jean-Jacques Rousseau	Selected Writings	The Collector’s Library of Essential Thinkers
9781904919520	Jerome K. Jerome	Three Men in a Boat	Collector's Library
9781909621350	Johanna Spyri	Heidi	Collector's Library
9781905716531	John Buchan	Greenmantle	Collector's Library
9781905716449	John Buchan	The Thirty-Nine Steps	Collector's Library
9781904919490	John Cleland	Fanny Hill	Collector's Library
9781904919254	John Keats	Selected Poems	Collector's Poetry Library
9781904633716	Jonathan Swift	Gulliver's Travels	Collector's Library
9781904919865	Joseph Conrad	Heart of Darkness and Other Stories	Collector's Library
9781904919476	Joseph Conrad	The Secret Agent	Collector's Library
9781907360183	Joseph Jacobs	Celtic Fairy Tales	Collector's Library
9781904919568	Jules Verne	Around the World in Eighty Days	Collector's Library
9781909621367	Jules Verne	Journey to the Centre of the Earth	Collector's Library
9781907360022	Jules Verne	Twenty Thousand Leagues Under the Seas	Collector's Library
9781909621107	Juliette Mitchell	Love Poetry	Collector's Library
9781904919155	Karl Marx	Selected Writings	The Collector’s Library of Essential Thinkers
9781905716739	Karl Marx	Selected Writings	Collector's Library
9781904919513	Kenneth Grahame	The Wind in the Willows	Collector's Library
9781907360916	Kenneth Grahame	The Wind in the Willows	Collector's Library in Colour
9781907360237	Khalil Gibran	The Prophet	Collector's Library
9781905716524	L. Frank Baum	The Wizard of Oz	Collector's Library
9781907360909	L. Frank Baum	The Wizard of Oz	Collector's Library in Colour
9781909621145	L. M. Montgomery	Anne of Green Gables	Collector's Library
9781907360817	L. P. Hartley	The Go-Between	Collector's Library
9781907360541	Laurie Lee	Cider with Rosie	Collector's Library
9781907360008	Leo Tolstoy	Anna Karenina	Collector's Library
9781904633853	Leo Tolstoy	War and Peace	Collector's Library
9781904633327	Lewis Carroll	Alice in Wonderland and Through the Looking-Glass	Collector's Library
9781907360367	Lewis Carroll	Alice in Wonderland and Through the Looking-Glass	Collector's Library in Colour
9781905716845	Lewis Carroll	Complete Illustrated Works	Collector's Library Omnibus Editions
9781904633945	Lewis Carroll	The Complete Works	Collector's Library Editions
9781907360442	Lewis Carroll	The Complete Works	Collector's Library Editions
9781904919087	Lewis Spence	Myths and Legends of the North American Indians	The Collector’s Library of Myth and Legend
9781904633273	Louisa May Alcott	Little Women	Collector's Library
9781907360213	Louisa May Alcott	Little Women and Good Wives	Collector's Library
9781905716098	M. R. James	Complete Ghost Stories	Collector's Library
9781907360268	Marcus Aurelius	Meditations	Collector's Library
9781907360039	Marcus Clapham	Best Fairy Stories of the World	Collector's Library
9781907360046	Marcus Clapham	Best Ghost Stories	Collector's Library
9781905716685	Marcus Clapham	Limericks	Collector's Library
9781909621008	Marcus Clapham	Poetry of the First World War	Collector's Library
9781904633464	Mark Twain	Huckleberry Finn	Collector's Library
9781904633471	Mark Twain	Tom Sawyer	Collector's Library
9781909621152	Mary Elizabeth Braddon	Lady Audley's Secret	Collector's Library
9781904633426	Mary Shelley	Frankenstein	Collector's Library
9781907360220	Max Beerbohm	Zuleika Dobson: An Oxford Love Story	Collector's Library
9781904919599	Michel Eyquem de Montaigne	Essays	The Collector’s Library of Essential Thinkers
9781904919766	Miguel de Cervantes	Don Quixote	Collector's Library Editions
9781904919797	Miguel de Cervantes	Don Quixote	Collector's Library
9781907360848	Muriel Spark	The Prime of Miss Jean Brodie	Collector's Library
9781904633129	Nathaniel Hawthorne	The Scarlet Letter	Collector's Library
9781904633815	Niccolo Machiavelli	The Prince and The Art of War	Collector's Library
9781907360855	Noel Streatfeild	Ballet Shoes	Collector's Library
9781909621121	Oscar Wilde	Best Plays	Collector's Library
9781905716869	Oscar Wilde	Complete Illustrated Works	Collector's Library Omnibus Editions
9781904633983	Oscar Wilde	The Complete Works	Collector's Library Editions
9781907360244	Oscar Wilde	The Complete Works	Collector's Library Editions
9781905716623	Oscar Wilde	The Happy Prince and Other Stories	Collector's Library
9781904633150	Oscar Wilde	The Picture of Dorian Gray	Collector's Library
9781904919858	Oscar Wilde	Wilde: Shorter Fiction	Collector's Library
9781904919391	Peter Harness	Poetry Of The First World War	Collector’s Poetry Library
9781904919384	Peter Harness	The Metaphysical Poets	Collector’s Poetry Library
9781909621206	Philippa Pearce	Tom's Midnight Garden	Collector's Library
9781904919100	Plato	Selections From	The Collector’s Library of Essential Thinkers
9781904919407	Plato, Aristophanes, Xenophon	On Socrates	The Collector’s Library of Essential Thinkers
9781905716722	Plato, Aristophanes, Xenophon	On Socrates	Collector's Library
9781904919124	Rene Descartes	Selected Writings	The Collector’s Library of Essential Thinkers
9781904633969	Richard Burton	The Arabian Nights	Collector's Library Editions
9781907360435	Richard Burton	The Arabian Nights	Collector's Library Editions
9781909621053	Robert Graves	Goodbye to All That	Collector's Library
9781907360800	Robert Graves	I, Claudius	Collector's Library
9781904633433	Robert Louis Stevenson	Dr Jekyll and Mr Hyde and other stories	Collector's Library
9781905716579	Robert Louis Stevenson	Kidnapped	Collector's Library
9781904633440	Robert Louis Stevenson	Treasure Island	Collector's Library
9781904919193	Rodney Dale	The Book of What?	Collector’s Reference Library
9781904919209	Rodney Dale	The Book of When?	Collector’s Reference Library
9781904919216	Rodney Dale	The Book of Where?	Collector’s Reference Library
9781904919223	Rodney Dale	The Book of Who?	Collector’s Reference Library
9781909621190	Rosemary Gray	Alice in Wonderland Everlasting Diary	Collector's Library
9781907360961	Rosemary Gray	Everlasting Diary	Collector's Library
9781909621275	Rosemary Gray	London: An Illustrated Literary Companion	Collector's Library
9781909621336	Rosemary Gray	Sherlock Holmes Everlasting Diary	Collector's Library
9781905716562	Rudyard Kipling	Jungle Book	Collector's Library
9781904633402	Rudyard Kipling	Just So Stories	Collector's Library
9781907360664	Rudyard Kipling	Kim	Collector's Library
9781904919247	Rudyard Kipling	Selected Poems	Collector’s Poetry Library
9781907360657	Rudyard Kipling	Selected Verse	Collector's Library
9781904919551	Rudyard Kipling	The Man Who Would Be King and Other Stories	Collector's Library
9781909621329	Samuel Taylor Coleridge	The Rime of the Ancient Mariner	Collector's Library
9781909621015	Sebastian Faulks	Birdsong	Collector's Library
9781904633334	Stephen Crane	Red Badge of Courage	Collector's Library
9781909621220	Sun Tzu	The Art of War	Collector's Library
9781904919056	T. W. Rolleston	Myths and Legends of the Celtic Race	The Collector’s Library of Myth and Legend
9781905716395	Thomas Hardy	Far from the Madding Crowd	Collector's Library
9781904919377	Thomas Hardy	Selected Poems	Collector’s Poetry Library
9781904633105	Thomas Hardy	Tess of the D'Urbervilles	Collector's Library
9781904633112	Thomas Hardy	The Mayor of Casterbridge	Collector's Library
9781904919506	Thomas Hardy	The Melancholy Hussar and Other Stories	Collector's Library
9781904919605	Thomas Hobbes & John Locke	On Sovereignty	The Collector’s Library of Essential Thinkers
9781907360640	Thomas Hughes	Tom Brown's Schooldays	Collector's Library
9781904633976	Thomas Malory	Le Morte D'Arthur	Collector's Library Editions
9781907360503	Thomas Malory	Le Morte D'Arthur	Collector's Library Editions
9781904919131	Thomas Paine	Rights of Man	The Collector’s Library of Essential Thinkers
9781907360206	Various Authors	A Boxful of Ghosts	Boxset
9781907360404	Various Authors	Best Fairy Tales	Boxset
9781907360152	Various Authors	Christmas Box	Boxset
9781904633594	Various Authors	Collector's Library 16	Boxset
9781909621084	Various Authors	First World War Box	Boxset
Unknown	Various Authors	Great Women Writers	Boxset
9781905716265	Various Authors	Seven of the Best	Collector's Library Editions
9781905716463	Various Authors	The Enchanted World	Collector's Library Editions
9781904633730	Victor Hugo	The Hunchback of Notre Dame	Collector's Library
9781909621138	Virginia Woolf	A Room of One's Own	Collector's Library
9781904633242	Virginia Woolf	Mrs Dalloway	Collector's Library
9781904919582	Virginia Woolf	The Waves	Collector's Library
9781904633495	Virginia Woolf	To the Lighthouse	Collector's Library
9781904919940	Voltaire	Candide and other stories	Collector's Library
9781905716838	W. B. Yeats	Collected Poems	Collector's Library
9781907360343	W. Somerset Maugham	Best Short Stories	Collector's Library
9781904633747	Walter Scott	Ivanhoe	Collector's Library
9781905716050	Wilkie Collins	The Moonstone	Collector's Library
9781904919964	Wilkie Collins	The Woman in White	Collector's Library
9781907360749	William Blake	Songs of Innocence and Songs of Experience	Collector's Library in Colour
9781905716784	William Shakespeare	A Midsummer Night's Dream	Collector's Library
9781907360602	William Shakespeare	As You Like It	Collector's Library
9781905716807	William Shakespeare	Hamlet	Collector's Library
9781907360114	William Shakespeare	Henry V	Collector's Library
9781907360824	William Shakespeare	Julius Caesar	Collector's Library
9781907360589	William Shakespeare	King Lear	Collector's Library
9781905716791	William Shakespeare	Macbeth	Collector's Library
9781907360138	William Shakespeare	Othello	Collector's Library
9781907360596	William Shakespeare	Richard III	Collector's Library
9781905716814	William Shakespeare	Romeo and Juliet	Collector's Library
9781904633921	William Shakespeare	The Complete Works	Collector's Library Editions
9781905716319	William Shakespeare	The Complete Works	Collector’s Library Editions in Colour
9781907360466	William Shakespeare	The Complete Works	Collector's Library Editions
9781907360121	William Shakespeare	The Merchant of Venice	Collector's Library
9781904919230	William Shakespeare	The Sonnets	Collector’s Poetry Library
9781905716678	William Shakespeare	The Sonnets	Collector's Library
9781907360886	William Shakespeare	The Sonnets	Collector's Library in Colour
9781907360831	William Shakespeare	The Taming of the Shrew	Collector's Library
9781907360619	William Shakespeare	The Tempest	Collector's Library
9781907360145	William Shakespeare	Twelfth Night	Collector's Library
9781904919957	William Thackeray	Vanity Fair	Collector's Library
9781904919261	William Wordsworth	Selected Poems	Collector’s Poetry Library

== Sources ==
- Collector's Library. New York: Barnes & Noble Books. 2005.
