= Die proof (philately) =

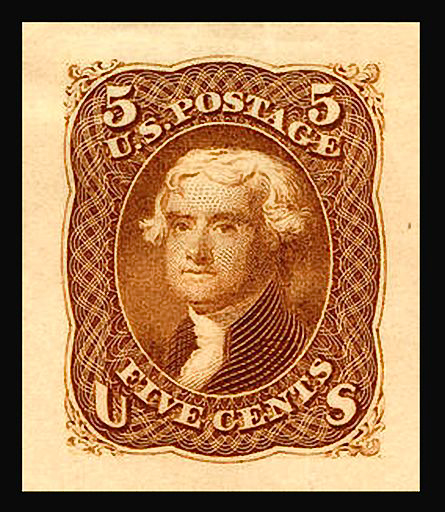
Die proof for the United States Jefferson issue of 1861

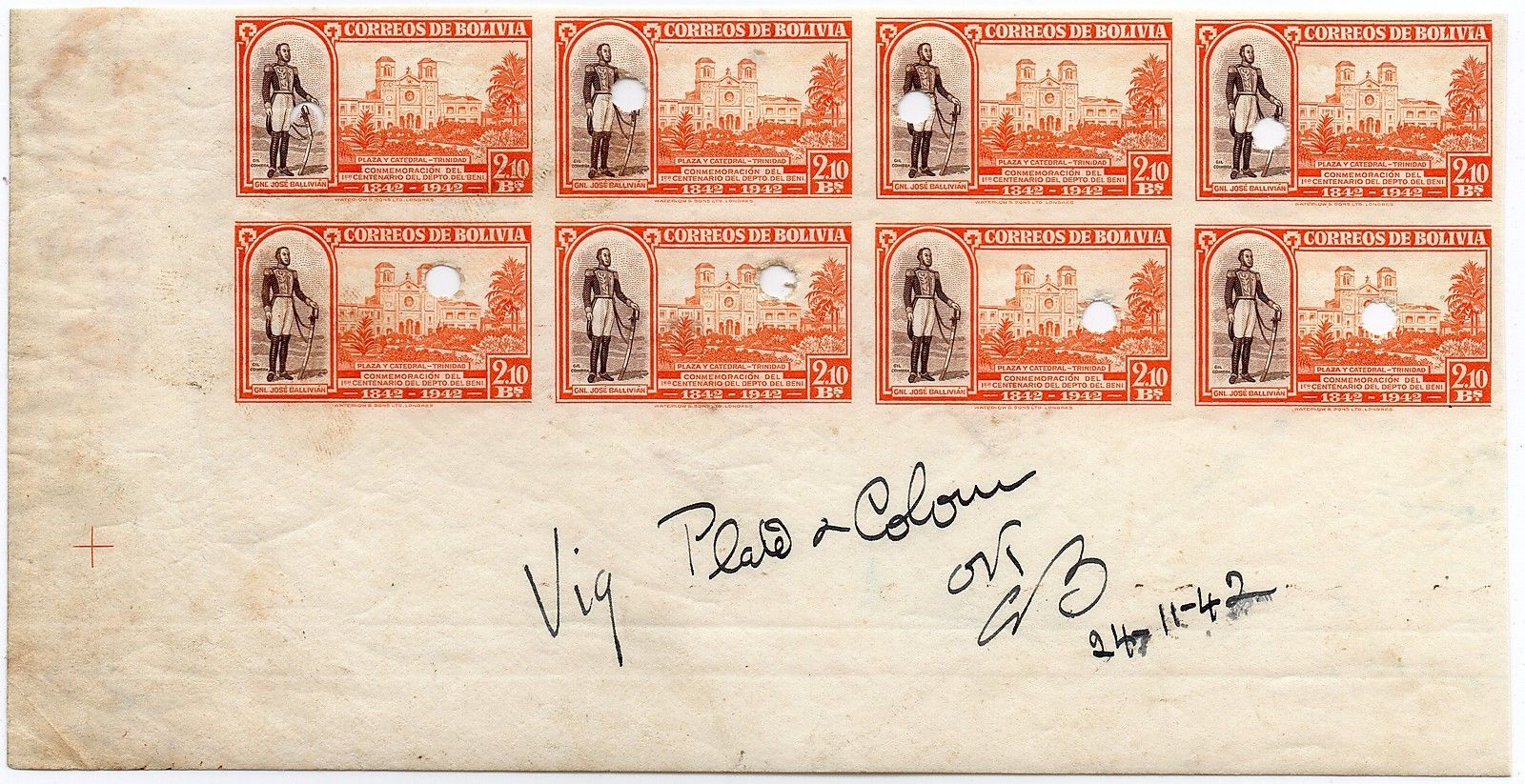
Approved proofs from Waterlow and Sons printers for a Bolivian stamp issue of 1943. (Subsequently punched for security purposes.)

In philately a Die Proof is a printed image pulled directly from the master die for an engraved stamp.

As a stamp is engraved it is necessary to check progress and a series of proofs are printed or 'pulled' from the die. These are known as progressive or contemporary die proofs.

Progressive proofs also form part of the design and approval process for a stamp. Any changes made during this process turn the proofs into essays which may be identified retrospectively because they differ from the issued stamp. Die proofs for engraved stamps are normally printed under great pressure onto oversized card and, as they are printed from the master die, they are normally of high quality. By contrast they may also be printed on India Paper, a strong, thin, opaque paper. The proofs are not necessarily in the same colour(s) as the issued stamp. A proof on India or other paper mounted on a die-sunk card is known as a hybrid proof.

Once the die is completed, it is transferred multiple times to the plate from which the stamps are printed.

Any pulls from the master die after the stamp has been printed are known as posthumous die proofs and are normally produced for presentation purposes, as samples of the printer's work or to satisfy philatelic demand (demand for the item amongst collectors of stamps).
