= Die (philately) =

Engraved image of a stamp on metal

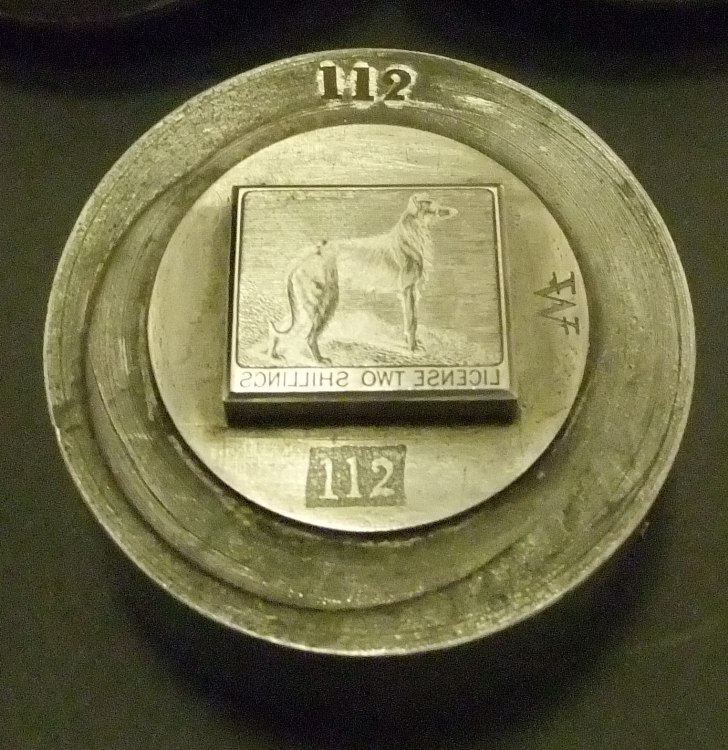
A die for a dog license stamp issued in Ireland, 1865–1928.

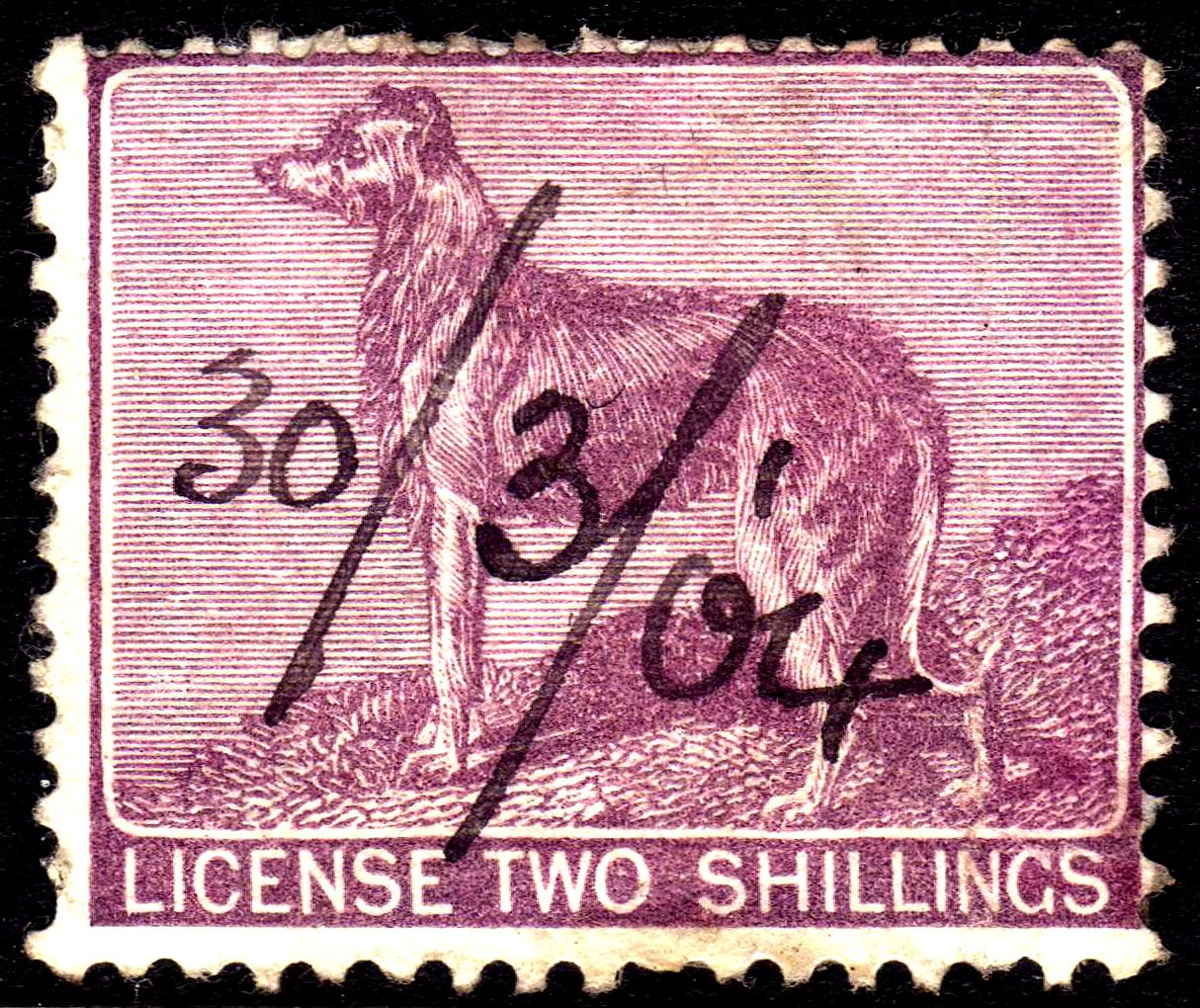
The stamp produced using the above die used in 1904.

In philately, a die is the engraved image of a stamp on metal which is subsequently multiplied by impression to create the printing plate (or printing base).

== See also ==
- Die proof (philately)
