= Melita Gordon =

Gastroenterologist

Melita Gordon CMG FRCP
- Education: University of Oxford; Queen's University Belfast
- Scientific career
- Workplaces: University of Liverpool; Malawi Liverpool Wellcome Trust

Melita Alison Gordon is a British gastroenterologist who works on invasive gut pathogens and tropical gastrointestinal disease. She leads the Malawi Liverpool Wellcome Trust Salmonella and Enterics Group. Gordon was awarded the British Society of Gastroenterology Sir Francis Avery Jones Research Medal in 2011.

== Education and early career ==
Gordon completed her undergraduate studies at the University of Cambridge. She completed her clinical qualifications at the University of Oxford and eventually specialised in internal medicine Queen's University Belfast. She has since worked in Zambia, Sheffield and Liverpool. In 1993 she was awarded the Liverpool School of Tropical Medicine Blacklock medal. In 1997 she was appointed a Wellcome Trust Clinical Fellow and Lecturer. She moved to Malawi in 1997, where she lived until 2005 and was part of the Malawi Liverpool Wellcome Trust.

== Research ==
In 2008 Gordon was made an NHS Higher Education Funding Council for England Clinical Fellow at the University of Liverpool. Her early work was the first to show how Salmonella becomes a lethal disease for HIV-positive people. She was promoted to Reader in 2012 and Professor in 2015. In 2015 she returned to Malawi where she leads the Malawi Liverpool Wellcome Trust Salmonella and Enterics Group. Gordon's research focuses on the development of vaccinations to protect against invasive bloodstream diseases caused by two groups of Salmonellae; typhoid fever and Invasive Non-Typhoidal Salmonellosis (iNTS). Gordon is committed to identifying novel vaccinations that can protect children in Africa from bacterial disease.

iNTS is a rare bacterial disease that is caused by extraintestinal infection of certain serotypes of Salmonella. iNTS kills around 80,000 people each year. It is more likely to occur in patients with HIV infection or malaria and the majority of people who suffer from iNTS are in Sub-Saharan Africa. In 2011 Gordon was awarded the British Society of Gastroenterology Sir Francis Avery Jones Research Medal and in 2012 the Shire Awards for Gastrointestinal Excellence prize for Excellence in Gastroenterology. She became Director of the World Gastroenterology Organisation Blantyre Training Center in 2016.

In 2018 Gordon led Africa's launch of the new typhoid conjugate vaccine, and successfully vaccinated 24,000 children in Malawi in the first six months. The first child, Golden Kondowe, received the first vaccination in Ndirande, Blantyre. The Typhoid Vaccine Acceleration Consortium (TyVAC) study was funded by the Bill & Melinda Gates Foundation and was the result of twenty years of research of Salmonella in Malawi. The vaccine, which contains the Vi antigen (a part of the Salmonella Typhi bacterium that helps it cause disease), is expected to protect against typhoid and other infections. She works with local scientists, health workers and the Malawi Ministry of Health. The vaccine was shown to protect 81% of children from becoming infected with typhoid fever.

Gordon and the University of Liverpool Centre for Global Vaccine Research were awarded a multi-million pound research grant to establish the Horizon 2020 Vacci-iNTS consortium. The consortium looks to develop new vaccines and research the financial and social impact of iNTS on communities in Africa impacted by the disease.

In 2019 Gordon was made a National Institute for Health Research Global Research Professor. Her research has been supported by the Bill & Melinda Gates Foundation, Medical Research Council, Wellcome Trust, British Society of Gastroenterology and Department for Business, Energy and Industrial Strategy.

=== Selected publications ===
Her publications include:

- Gordon, Melita A. (2012). "Invasive non-typhoidal salmonella disease: an emerging and neglected tropical disease in Africa". The Lancet. 379 (9835): 2489–2499. doi:10.1016/S0140-6736(11)61752-2. PMC 3402672. PMID 22587967.
- Gordon, Melita A. (2008). "Epidemics of Invasive Salmonella enterica Serovar Enteritidis and S. enterica Serovar Typhimurium Infection Associated with Multidrug Resistance among Adults and Children in Malawi". Clinical Infectious Diseases. 46 (7): 963–969. doi:10.1086/529146. PMID 18444810.
- Gordon, Melita A. (2008). "Salmonella infections in immunocompromised adults". Journal of Infection. 56 (6): 413–422. doi:10.1016/j.jinf.2008.03.012. PMID 18474400.

== Honours and recognition ==
In the 2024 King's Birthday Honours, Gordon was appointed Companion of the Order of St Michael and St George (CMG) "for services to global health". She was elected a Fellow of the Academy of Medical Sciences in 2025.

== Personal life ==
Gordon is married to Stephen Gordon, former Director of the Malawi Liverpool Wellcome Trust Programme in Malawi.
