= Anton Agius =

Maltese sculptor (1933–2008)

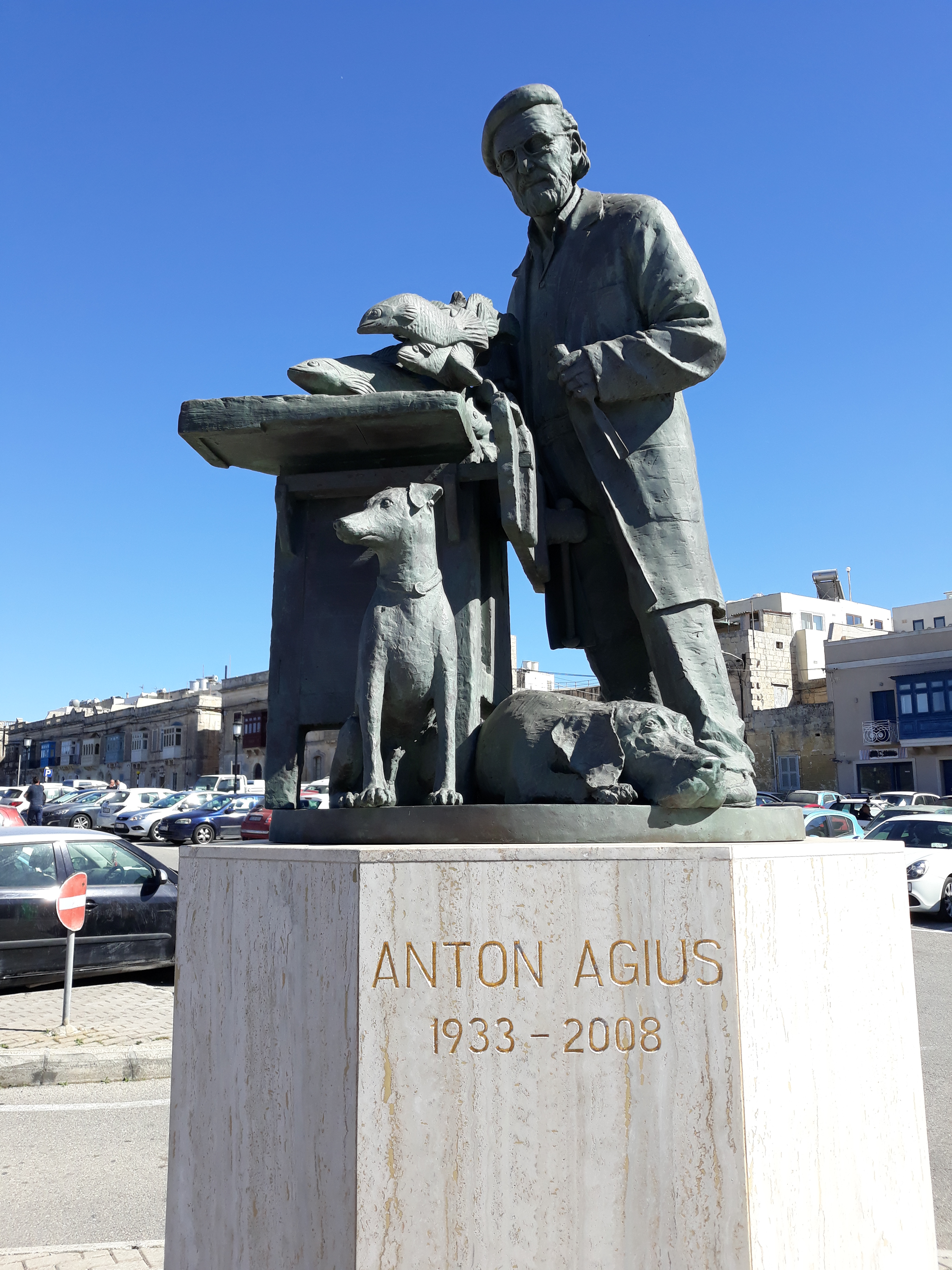
- Memorial to Anton Agius in Pjazza Anton Agius, Rabat
- Born: 1 December 1933; Rabat, Malta
- Died: 19 October 2008 (aged 74)
- Resting place: St. Margaret Cemetery, Rabat, Malta
- Education: Malta Society of Arts, Manufacturers and Commerce. School of Arts. Accademia di Belle Arti. St Martin’s School of Art, London
- Known for: Sculpture

Anton Agius (1 December 1933 – 19 October 2008) was a Maltese sculptor, best known for creating a large number of monuments around Malta. He was dubbed "the national sculptor" by former Maltese president Ugo Mifsud Bonnici.

== Early life ==
Agius was born in Rabat on 1 December 1933, to parents Ġużeppi and Stella (née Galea). His first artistic interest was in music, however he didn't focus on this area after concerns from his mother.

== Education ==
Agius first attended state school in Rabat.

His first instruction in art was under sculptor Samuel Bugeja, Aguis' cousin, who tutored him in drawing. Agius was then an apprentice under sculptor Guzeppi Galea during his teens. Agius continued his education at the Malta Society of Arts, Manufacturers, and Commerce between 1950 and 1953 where he studied under Ignazio Cefai. He then spent 4 years at the School of Arts, where he was tutored by Emvin Cremona, Vincent Apap, and Ġorġ Borg under who he studied clay modeling. In 1957, Agius was awarded a government scholarship to study at the Scuola del Nudo dell’ Associazione Artistica Internazionale at the Accademia di Belle Arti in Rome where he studied under Pericle Fazzini and Michele Guerrisi. Following that, he studied at St Martin's School of Art in London. Here he studied under Frank Martin, Elizabeth Frink, Anthony Caro and Eduardo Paolozzi. His studies at St Martin's led him to achieve the national diploma in design, modelling, sculpture and letter cutting.

== Career ==
Agius worked as an art teacher in several secondary state schools in Malta and a lecturer at the University of Malta. He was also a member of the Malta Aesthetics Board.

He worked in several media including clay, bronze, concrete, stone, resin, lino-printing, and wood. It has been reported that wood was Aguis's favourite medium. Of note is a collection of works in olive wood that is now housed in the Mdina Cathedral Museum, accompanied by drawings by Agius himself. He also created several works for several entities in Rabat, including churches and the St Paul Band Club, and donated several of his works to the parish museum. Other notable works are the crucifix he created for the Kerygma Chapel and the statue of St Frances Assisi at the entrance of the Peace Lab.

In 2003, a statue by Agius was placed in the foyer of the Cardiff City Hall. The statue is named "Greenham Marcher" and it commemorates the Greenham Common protesters.

=== Exhibitions ===
Agius exhibited his works at several exhibitions including:

- Exhibition at the National Museum (1969)
- Exhibitions at the Museum of Fine Arts (1974, 1979)
- Maltese Sculptures and Ceramics Exhibition, Galleria Fenici (1981)
- Art ’84 – Malta Exhibition (1984)
- Public Service Week Art Exhibition (1996)
- 13th Bank of Valletta Exhibition (2005)

=== Monuments ===
Agius is best known for creating several monuments around Malta. These monuments all depict important Maltese people or events. Some of these monuments include:

Monument	Location	Image	Sources
Workers’ Monument	Msida		
Dun Mikiel Xerri and Compatriots	Valletta		
Manwel Dimech statue	Valletta		
Sette Giugno Riots monument	Valletta		
Mabel Strickland bust	Strickland House, Valletta		
Freedom Monument	Birgu		
Mgr. G. De Piro monument	Rabat		
Guze’ Ellul Mercer statue	Dingli		
Anton Buttigieg bust	Qala		
Mikiel Anton Vassalli monument	Żebbug		
Frans Baldacchino Il-Budaj bust	Ir-Razzett Tal-Markiż, Mosta		
Monument to the Maltese Missionaries	Mosta		
Lorry Sant monument	Paola		
Dr Paul Xuereb monument	Mdina		

=== Postage stamps ===
Agius has also designed a number of Maltese postage stamps:

- De Soldanis & Dun Karm 1971 - 2s Dun Karm
- Heart 1972 - 2d Heart and WHO emblem
- Heart 1972 - 10d Heart and WHO emblem
- Heart 1972 - 2s 6d Heart & WHO emblem
- Maltese Workers 1977 - 2c Helping handicapped workers
- Maltese Workers 1977 - 7c Stone building and industrial trades
- Maltese Workers 1977 - 20c Dangers encountered by workers
- International Year of Peace 1986 - 8c

== Awards and accolades ==
Agius was awarded several prizes and honours, some of which are shown in the table below.

Award and Placing	Awarding Body	Country	Year	Source
Human Rights Art Exhibition - First Prize			1968	
Trophy for the Best-Kept Village - First Prize			1971	
Onorificenza Del Dio Pan		Florence, Italy	1979	
Artist of the Year Award			1980	
Targa d'Onore	Associazione Artistica Culturale d'Italia		1982	
First International Art Biennale - Second Prize		Malta	1995	
Bienneale Internazzjonali tal-Arti		Malta	1997	
Membership of the National Order of Merit	Government of Malta	Malta	2005	
2006 Gold Award Medal	Society of Arts, Manufacturers and Commerce	Malta	2007	

== Death ==
Agius died on 19 October 2008 at age 74. His funeral was held on 22 October 2008 in the Church of the Nativity of Our Lady, Rabat, after which he was buried in St. Margaret Cemetery in Rabat.

== Legacy ==
=== Monument ===
Plans for a monument to Anton Agius started in August 2009 with the setting up of a committee. This included the mayor of Rabat, Alexander Craus, as the committee chairman. The finished monument was unveiled in Rabat on 7 May 2011.

The monument depicts Anton Agius at his work bench, sculpting fish out of a piece of olive wood while in the company of his two dogs. The design of the monument is the work of Joseph Scerri, one of Agius' students. The fish depicted in the monument were the work of another student of Agius, Monica Spiteri. Spiteri was entrusted with modelling a copy of Aguis' work "Shoal of Fish", which he had sculpted out of wood just as depicted in the monument. The work bench in the monument is a replica of Aguis' actual work bench. It was created by his brother, Micheal Agius, by taking a plaster cast of the original bench.

The monument was cast in bronze at the Fonderia d'Arte Massimo del Chiaro in Pietrasanta, Italy. Agius worked with this foundry during his lifetime and had become friends with the del Chiaro family.

=== Commemorative exhibitions ===
In 2009, the Culture Commission of the L’Isle Adam Band Club of Rabat organised an exhibition showcasing works by Agius, in commemoration of the first anniversary of his death. Works included in this exhibition were various, including sculptures, statues, models, and bozzettos.

Another exhibition of Agius' works was held in 2010 in Mosta. This exhibition was organised by the society Talent Mosti, of which Agius was an honorary member.

=== Anton Agius Foundation ===
In 2009, the Rabat local council set up the Anton Agius Foundation. The aim of this foundation is to restore Rabat's several historic monuments, buildings, and niches which were in need of repair.
