= Designers of Maltese stamps =

The designers of Maltese stamps have been creating their works for the last 150 years. The most prolific designer of Maltese stamps was Emvin Cremona, who designed most of Malta's stamps from the late 1950s to the 1970s. Dates indicate the years stamps with the artist's design were used (except for overprints).

In some cases, the design of the stamp is entirely based on old paintings. When this occurred, the artist (such as Giuseppe Calì or Edward Lear) is listed as the stamp designer, even though the stamp was issued years after the painting was made.

== A ==
- Anthony Agius (1971–1988)
- Fabio Agius (2009)
- Harry D. Alden (1971–1976)
- Frank X. Ancilleri (1994–2008)
- Vincent Apap (1980)
- Norbert Attard (1982–1992)
- Stefan Attard (2009)
- Frank Azzopardi (2010)

== B ==
- Esprit Barthet (1983–1988)
- John Batchelor (2010)
- Henry Mayo Bateman (2012)
- Martin Bonavia (2000–2006)
- Josian Bonello (2007)
- Alexandra Bonnici (1979)
- Ġanni Bonnici (1985)
- Isabelle Borg (1998)
- Chiara Borg (2000)
- Harry Borg (1977–2007)
- John Martin Borg (2007)
- Lino Borg (1984)
- Damian Borg Nicolas (1996–2005)
- J. Briffa (1977)
- Tony Bugeja (1981–1990)
- Lawrence Buttigieg (1992)

== C ==
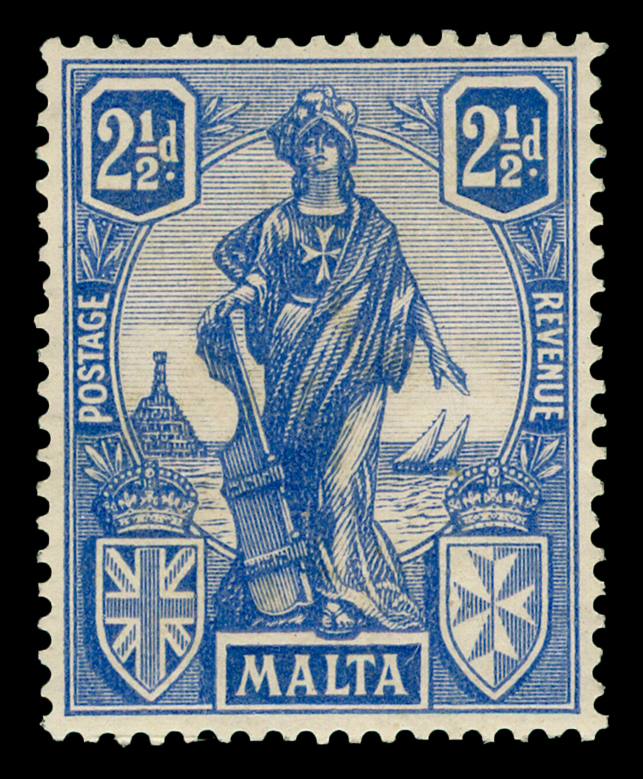
1926 stamp from the Melita issue designed by Edward Caruana Dingli

- Giuseppe Calì (2007)
- Brenda Camenzuli (2011)
- Antoine Camilleri (1978–1987)
- Nazareno Camilleri (1976)
- Paul Camilleri Cauchi (2004–2005)
- Paul Carbonaro (1993)
- Richard J. Caruana (1978–2017)
- Roxana Caruana (2000–2006)
- Debbie Caruana Dingli (1996–2004)
- Edward Caruana Dingli (1922–1926)
- Gordon Caruana Dingli (2009)
- Alfred Caruana Ruggier (2004–2007)
- Joseph Casha (1970–2004)
- Louis Casha (1989)
- Charles Cassar (1983)
- Catherine Cavallo (1996)
- Alfred Chirchop (1993)
- Sean Cini (2010–2012)
- Jean Paul Cousin (2000)
- Emvin Cremona (1957–1980)
- Marco Cremona (1988)

== D ==
- Anthony de Giovanni (1975–1981)
- Darren Duncan (2008)

== E ==
- Melanie Efstathiadou (2008)
- Sandra and George Ellul Sullivan (1974)
- Richard England (1975–1987)

== F ==
- Freddie Fenech (1988)
- George Fenech (1977)
- Michelle Fenech (1979)
- Ludwig Flask (2000–2001)
- Hugo Fleury (1935)
- Donald Friggieri (1975–1985)
- Emil Fuchs (1903–1911)

== G ==
- Noel Galea Bason (1990)
- Cedric Galea Pirotta (2010–2015)
- Ray Gauci (1988–1989)
- Michael Goaman (1963)
- Ronen Goldberg (2014)
- Anouschka Grech (2006)
- Anton Grech (1990)
- Anna Grima (1995)

== H ==
- John Harrison (1926–1930)
- Mette & Eric Hourier del (2005)

== J ==
- Jean Ferdinand Joubert de la Ferté (1860–1885) – engraver of the Halfpenny Yellow

== L ==
- Edward Lear (2012)

== M ==
- Sir Bertram Mackennal (1914–1922)
- Ġorġ Mallia (1999–2001)
- Joseph L. Mallia (1982–1997)
- Salvu Mallia (1987)
- Daniel Mangiani (2008–2009)
- Andrew Micallef (1999–2007)
- Joe Mark Micallef (2007–2015)
- Luciano Micallef (1984–1996)
- Jean Pierre Mizzi (2004–2006)
- Joseph Mizzi (1993–2003)

== P ==
- Alexei Pace (2009)
- George M. Pace (1972–1973)
- Bettina Paris (2000–2006)
- Edward D. Pirotta (2007–2013)
- Anton Pisani (1979)
- Raymond Pitre (1979–1985)
- Frank Portelli (1976–1991)
- Paul Psaila (2008–2010)
- Reno Psaila (1971)

== S ==
- Rene Sacco (2004)
- Edward Said (2011)
- Joseph Said (2010)
- Nicole Sciberras (2011)
- Joe P. Smith (2002–2007)
- Stephen C. Spiteri (2003)
- Ansgar Spratte (1999)

== T ==
- Maurice Tanti Burlo' (1981–2010)

== V ==
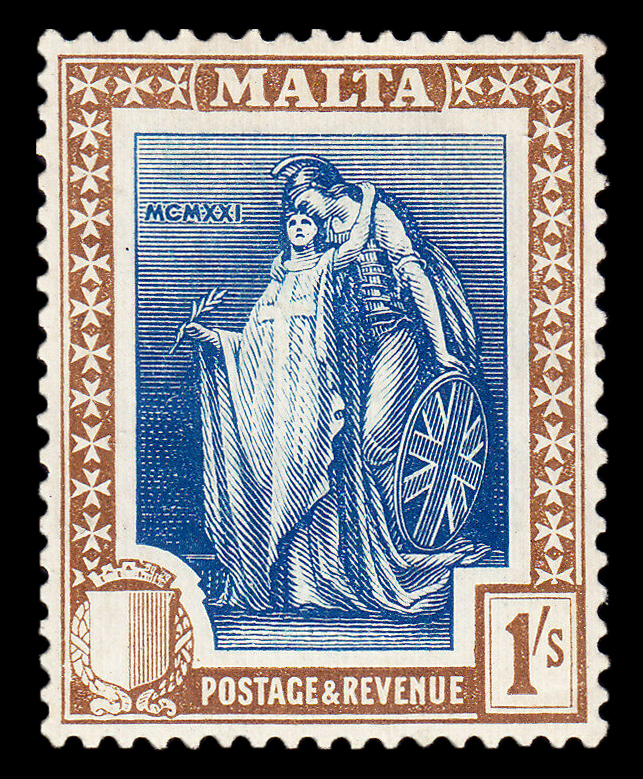
1922 stamp from the Melita issue designed by Gianni Vella

- George Vella (2006)
- Gianni Vella (1922)
- Mark Anthony Vella (2003–2007)

== W ==
- Victor Whitely (1963)
- Dorothy Wilding (1949–1953)

== Z ==
- Roberta Zahra (2002)
- Trevor Żahra (2001)
- Astrid Zammit (2006)
- Jean Paul Zammit (2000)

== See also ==
- Postage stamps and postal history of Malta
- List of people on stamps of Malta

== Bibliography ==
- Buttigieg, Joseph (2014). The J.B. Catalogue of Malta Stamps and Postal History (22 ed.). Sliema: Sliema Stamp Shop Publishers.
- MaltaPost p.l.c. – Philatelic Bureau
