= Barthet =

Barthet is a French surname. Notable people with the surname include:

- Anne-Sophie Barthet (born 1988), French alpine skier
- Anthony Borg Barthet (born 1947), Maltese European Court of Justice and former Attorney General of Malta
- Esprit Barthet (1919–1999), Maltese artist
- Magloire-Désiré Barthet (1832–1912), French Roman Catholic bishop
