= Antoine Camilleri =

Antoine Camilleri may refer to:

- Antoine Camilleri (artist) (1922–2005), Maltese artist and art teacher
- Antoine Camilleri (prelate) (born 1965), Maltese official of the Vatican
