= Nicolas Untersteller =

French painter

Nicolas Untersteller (1900–1967) was a French painter.

== Early life ==
He was born in Stiring-Wendel, Lorraine, during the first German annexation. After studies at the School of Decorative Arts in Strasbourg from 1921 to 1923, he joined the Ecole Nationale Supérieure des Beaux-Arts in Paris at the workshops of Fernand Cormon (1854–1924), Jean-Pierre Laurens (1875–1932) and his brother Paul Albert Laurens (1870–1934), also professors at the Académie Julian. He went to Villa Medici in Rome from 1929 to 1931. He received the Grand Prix de Rome in 1928.

== Career ==
In 1930, he was a professor of painting and drawing at the Academy Yvon and created in 1931 a school of painting in Metz and presented his exhibition "Return of Rome". From 1933 to 1934, he was a boarder at Casa de Velázquez in Madrid, Spain.

A member of the Academy of Fine Arts, Untersteller taught fresco at the Paris School of Fine Arts in 1937. He was appointed a member of the Board of Fine Arts of Paris in 1940. From 1941 to 1948 he was a professor, head of the painting workshop. Among his pupils were Jean-Marie Patel, better known today under his pseudonym Arcabas, painter of sacred art, Henriette Lambert, Antoine Camilleri and Roger Forissier. In 1948 he was appointed Director of the École Nationale.

== Personal life ==
He married Hélène Delaroche, also a painter, in 1929. In 1934 his daughter Marguerite-Marie was born in Metz. The year 1940 saw the birth of his son Louis-Paul, at Sèvres.
