= Frank Portelli (artist) =

Maltese artist and mural painter

Frank Portelli (1922–2004) was a mural artist and fine art painter from Malta whose work was exhibited at the Venice Biennale in 1958. Within a few months after his death, one of his murals was also acquired by Heritage Malta for the country's national art collection.

== Education ==
Portelli started attending the School of Art in Valletta when he was 13 years old. There, along with fellow artist Antoine Camilleri, he studied under the Caruana Dingli brothers, Edward and Robert, and Karmenu Mangion.

He distinguished himself at the School of Art in 1947, earning a scholarship to study at Leicester College in England.

== Career ==
The foremost work from he early career is an autobiographical work he started in 1944, immediately following the death of his father.

After he completed his formal studies, in 1951 he co-founded the Modern Art Circle in Malta. With this group he made his first public appearance at the Malta Society of Art's Palazzo de la Salle in 1952. The Modern Art Circle was later rebranded as the Modern Art Group and Atelier 56.

In 1957 he was one of six modern artists from Malta selected to exhibit at the first ever Malta pavilion at the Venice Biennale in 1958. His painting Resurrezione signed and dated 1957 was exhibited prominently in Venice and appeared on an official postcard issued by organizers.

Throughout the 1960s Portelli created a number of murals for the nascent tourism industry. One of these, called Maltese Crafts, was created for the Melliħa Bay Hotel in 1969, and acquired for Malta's national art collection in 2004.

== Personal life ==
In 1952 he married Rosa née Attard. They had three children: Henri (b. 1953), Simone (b. 1956) and Sharonne (b. 1958).

Frank Portelli died on 13 March 2004. He is buried at the Santa Maria Addolorata Cemetery in Paola, the largest burial ground of Malta.
