= Esprit Barthet =

Maltese artist

- Born: 6 October 1919; Valletta, Malta
- Died: 4 July 1999 (aged 79); Swieqi, Malta
- Education: Malta School of Art; Regia Accademia di Belle Arti; Academy of Arts in Bath
- Known for: Painting, Drawing, Portraits

Esprit Barthet (6 October 1919 – 4 July 1999) was an artist born in Valletta, Malta on 6 October 1919. Son of Camillo and Guzeppina Grixti.

He started art studies in Valletta, at the Government School of Arts. He went to Rome where he attended the Regia Accademia di Belle Arti and later to England, at the Academy of Arts in Bath. In the early 1950s he started experimenting with cubism and the abstract. Much of his work can be admired in public places, Government Departments and in many private collections in Malta and abroad.

In 1944, he married Teresa Borg and had six children.

He died on 4 July 1999.

There is a street named after him: 'Triq Esprit Barthet' in Swieqi, Malta. Triq means street in Maltese.

== Training ==
- 1932 - School of Arts, Malta 1932 Under Robert and Edward Caruana Dingli
- 1938-1939 - Accademia d'Belle Arti, Rome Under Carlo Siviero
- 1947 - Academy of Arts in Bath Corsham, Wiltshire, England

== Style ==
Portraits; Romantic Tradition; cubism; abstract

== Awards ==
He was awarded the title of Knight of the Italian Republic by the Italian Government and also invested as a member of the Order of St. John.

== Paintings ==
=== Portraits ===
- Prime Minister of Malta Dr. Francesco Buhagiar 1923-1924 (Oil on Canvas - 127x100cm)
- Prime Minister of Malta Dr. Enrico Mizzi 1950 (Oil on Canvas - 122x92cm)
- Prime Minister of Malta Dr. Gorg Borg Olivier 1950-1955 and 1962-1971 (Oil on Canvas - 122x91cm)
- Prime Minister of Malta Dr. Karmenu Mifsud Bonnici (Oil on Canvas - 80x95cm)
- President of Malta Dr. Vincent Tabone (Oil on Canvas - 118x75cm)
- Attorney General of Malta Dr. Anthony Borg Barthet (Oil on Canvas - 100x75cm)
- Governor-General of Malta Sir Maurice Dorman (Oil on Canvas - 184x122cm)

=== Rooftops ===
Barthet is also known for his abstract rooftops.

== National School of Art ==
Parliament established the National School of Art in the 1920s. During the reconstruction period that followed the Second World War, the emergence of the "Modern Art Group", whose members included Josef Kalleya (1898–1998), George Preca (1909–1984), Anton Inglott (1915–1945), Emvin Cremona (1919–1986), Frank Portelli (1922-2004), Antoine Camilleri (1922-2005) and Esprit Barthet (1919–1999) greatly enhanced the local art scene.
