= Luciano Micallef =

Maltese artist

- Born: 1 November 1954 (age 71); Birkirkara, Malta
- Education: Accademia di Belle Arti di Firenze
- Known for: Stamp & abstract art

Luciano Micallef is a Maltese abstract artist. He is one of the most famous artists in Malta for abstract art and has multiple paintings all over the island.

== Early life ==
He was born in Birkirkara, Malta on 1 November 1954. At age 10, he started studying art privately under Maltese artist Guzeppi Briffa, He later attended the Malta School of Art. He was awarded a scholarship by the Italian government to study art at the Accademia di Belli Arti di Firenze. He is considered a prominent Maltese artist of the 20th Century through his abstract art.

== Works ==
=== Art ===
In 1991 he exhibited his first selection of abstract paintings in the Contemporary Hall, National Museum of Fine Arts, Malta whilst also exhibiting as part of a collective within the same Museum but in two other locations, those of the Salon, Auberge de Provence and Ex Preti Rooms, Auberge de Provence, Malta.

In 2010 he was commissioned to create three large works in fused glass for the Church of Divine Mercy in San Pawl tat-targa, Malta.

Micallef has exhibited both in Malta and Overseas on numerous occasions. His exhibition space, Gallery 5 in 1996 is where he holds regular exhibitions of his works.

Micallef is known for his portrayals of leading personalities through his portraiture. He has portrayed Architect Renzo Piano, Roberto Benigni, Luciano Benetton and Gilberto Benetton, Ornella Muti, and Maltese politicians such as Eddie Fenech Adami and Ugo Mifsud Bonnici.

=== Stamp design ===
Between 1984 and 1996 he was commissioned by the Government of Malta to create designs for Maltese stamps. In 1984 he created designs to commemorate the 1984 Olympic Games held in the US, a set of Christmas stamps and designs to commemorate the 10th Anniversary of the Republic of Malta. In 1985 he designed collections to commemorate Europa - European Music Year and The 76th Anniversary of the Uprising 7 July 1919. In 1986, he designed a range of stamps in honour of Malta's leading philanthropists and the 1986 Traditional collection of Christmas Stamps. Every year from 1986 to 1991 he designed a set of stamps featuring historic Maltese uniforms. In 1993 saw the launch of a set of stamps depicting Scouts. He designed a set of stamps to commemorate the 100th anniversary of the modern Olympic Games that took place in 1996.

=== Graphic design and printmaking ===
In the early years of his career he was involved in printmaking, mainly etching and screen printing. He studied engraving at the Accademia di Belle Arti di Perugia.

Micallef has created packaging designs, book covers and event posters for Unesco and other organisations. His paintings have been featured on phone cards and credit cards of banks and telecommunication companies.

== Publications ==
The University of Malta published a book about his works in 1993 edited by Maltese philosopher Kenneth Wain entitled 'Luciano Micallef - A Study'.

Another book about Micallef's art entitled Abstracts was launched in 2006.

Over a long span of years he has collaborated with Poet Victor Fenech to create illustrations for poem/prose publications such as F'Altamira and Sangraal with its critical studies by Oliver Friggieri and Lovesongfifty.

In 2006 the Bank of Valletta presented a retrospective exhibition featuring 65 works of art from over thirty years of his career. A book entitled Luciano Micallef was published in conjunction with the event.

In 2019, an illustrated book by Luciano entitled Journey was published with past poems by Victor Fenech.
