= Ġużè Ellul Mercer =

Maltese author, journalist and politician

Member of Parliament
- In office 1951–1961

Deputy Leader of the Labour Party
- In office 1955 – 22 September 1961
- Preceded by: Joseph Flores
- Succeeded by: Anton Buttigieg

Personal details
- Born: 22 March 1897 Msida, Malta
- Died: 22 September 1961 (aged 64) Tas-Sliema, Malta
- Spouse: Maria Tereża Brockdorrf
- Profession: Playwright, poet, journalist

Ġużè Ellul Mercer (22 March 1897 – 22 September 1961) was a Maltese writer, journalist and politician. He joined the Labour Party (PL) and he started his parliamentary career in 1924. He was subsequently elected Member of Parliament at the general elections held in 1951 and 1955. In 1955, he was elected Labour Party deputy-leader for parliamentary affairs. He was also appointed Deputy Prime Minister and Minister for Public Works and Reconstruction in 1955, but lost that position after the 1958 election.

== Early life and career ==
Ellul Mercer was born in Msida in 1897, to Salvu Ellul and Jane née Mercer. He was the eldest amongst twelve siblings. His maternal uncle, Anthony Mercer was involved in setting up boy scouts in Malta during Baden-Powell's governorship of the islands. His maternal grandfather was a Scottish architect and civil engineer who designed a new dock at the Malta Drydocks. On the islands he met with his future wife, having one daughter together, Jane. Ellul Mercer's grandfather was Anglican, but converted to Catholicism on his deathbed.

His paternal grandparents were merchants and mastika-producers, owning a shop in Strada Merkanti, in Valletta. Ellul Mercer's parents also became spirit merchants. One of Ellul Mercer's siblings became a Franciscan friar, acting as a missionary in Guatemala and Honduras. He returned to Malta following the death of his elder brother.

Ellul Mercer was educated at the Gżira elementary school, at Flores College and the Lyceum. During the First World War, he entered the civil service as a clerk, reaching the grade of Chief Clerk by 1950.

=== Marriage ===
On 26 July 1921, he married Maria Teresa née Brockdorff, the daughter of Frederick Brockdorff a publisher from Imsida. They lived at 40, Ta' Xbiex Wharf, Imsida. They had a son, Martin, went on to become a Labour Party candidate in 2013. On 11 January 1953, his wife died in their Tas-Sliema house. She was 55, and she died within two years of the death of Ellul Mercer's mother. The loss of his wife had a negative effect on Ellul Mercer.

== Politics ==
=== Early involvement ===
Ġużè Ellul Mercer became involved in politics since 1919, before the establishment of the Labour Party. In 1924 he joined the committee of the Labour Party Club in Imsida, becoming assistant editor of the Labour newspaper Il Cotra (English: The Crowd) in 1928 and its editor in 1930. In 1928, he penned a series of short stories titled Il-Ħrejjef ta' Barraminau in the newspaper Il-Ħmar, with his writings being condemned by church authorities. The local police took the director of the newspaper, C. Satariano, and its editor, Ġużeppi Arena, to court over these writings. At first, they were fined for their actions but were found not guilty on appeal.

Ellul Mercer had a heart condition, and on 24 April 1929, he tendered his resignation from the Executive Committee of the Labour Party, however he continued his involvement with the party, becoming president of his local Labour Party club in 1931.

=== After the Second World War ===
In 1945, Ellul Mercer was involved in the drafting of the new 1947 Maltese self-government constitution by the National Assembly. He was one of the main speakers for the Labour Front, made up of the General Workers' Union and the Labour Party. The other main speakers were Paul Boffa, Reggie Miller, Mosè Gatt, Indri Cilia, Leli Tabone, Nestu Laiviera and Turu Colombo. Ellul Mercer was elected on the Assembly's Working Committee and its Financial Committee. The Assembly met for its last adjournment on 7 March 1947. The main achievements of this Assembly were the return to self-government on 5 September 1947 and universal suffrage for those aged 21 and over. Electors were limited with one vote, used to elect representatives in a unicameral Parliament, the Assemblea Leġislattiva.

In 1947, the Labour Party won the general elections, but within two years the Labour Party suffered an internal rift following disagreements between its Leader, Paul Boffa, who represented the moderate wing of the party, and one of its rising stars, Dom Mintoff, who stood for a more radical and socialist approach. Ellul Mercer joined Mintoff's fringe, even if he had worked with Boffa since the 1920s. Ellul Mercer followed the decision of the Labour Party's General Conference, which had removed Boffa from the party-leadership.

Ellul Mercer contested the 1950 general elections, but he failed to win a seat. In this election, although the newly renamed Malta Labour Party, led by Mintoff, and the Malta Workers Party, led by Boffa, together gained more votes and seats than the Partit Nazzjonalista, the two leftist parties' inability to reach a compromise led to the formation of a minority Nationalist government led by Enrico Mizzi. Following Mizzi's death on 20 December 1950, Giorgio Borġ Olivier became Prime Minister, however this minority government was weak, with another election held in 1951. Ellul Mercer was elected in this election, as well as in the successive two election in 1953 and 1955, contesting the seat for the fifth electoral district, made up of Gżira, Imsida, Tas-Sliema and San Ġiljan. In 1952, Ellul Mercer was involved in an activity by the Labour Party's youth association, organising lectures and seminars at the Marsascala Labour Party club.

=== Deputy Prime Minister and Minister ===
Following the electoral victory at the 1955 general elections, Prime Minister Mintoff chose Ellul Mercer as Minister for Public Works and Reconstruction. On 9 March 1955, Ellul Mercer was elected Deputy Leader of the Labour Party following Joseph Flores' resignation, who became speaker of the Assemblea Leġislattiva. In the contest for the deputy-leadership, Ellul Mercer gained 217 votes, with E.C. Tabone getting 93 votes.

On New Year's Eve 1956, Deputy Prime Minister Ellul Mercer broadcast the traditional message of greetings to the Maltese people. Ellul Mercer stated that the Maltese can look both to their future and their past with satisfaction, and that the country had managed to close the first, and most difficult phase, of the post-war reorganisation of its social and economic life. This would ensure the security, education and better living conditions for the whole Maltese islands.

For the first time in Maltese history, children were to be provided with full-time education, which became free. Technical education was introduced, with unskilled adults receiving training. Ellul Mercer said that the country's industrial progress would be ensured, with the Grand Harbour improved, an adequate water supply secured and afforestation plans. Ellul Mercer closed his speech by referring to the proposed integration of Malta with the United Kingdom, describing optimism for Malta's foreign-relations with the United Kingdom.

As Minister for Public Works and Reconstruction between March 1955 and April 1958, Ellul Mercer completed a number of projects, such as the widening and reconstruction of traffic links at Porte des Bombes, Floriana, and the reclamation of land leading to improved linkages and road-infrastructure in Msida. Ellul Mercer was also instrumental for the extension and construction of schools. By March 1957, eighteen schools were built anew, with extensions constructed in many others. Eleven new schools were planned for in 1957, with the extension of the Ħaż-Żebbuġ school, and a new girl's secondary school in Blata l-Bajda.

== Writer, playwright and poet ==
Ellul Mercer viewed literature as a means to educate the Maltese people. He began his literary career in 1927, with his writings in Il-Ħmar and Il-Ħmara. He also was a regular contributor to the monthly Labour magazine, The Knight, where he wrote a diary of his experiences in the Second World War. He wrote hundreds of articles in the newspaper Il Cotra and in other magazines and reviews. His works include:

- La Toqtolx (1927)
- A translation of The French Revolution: A History by Thomas Carlyle (1928)
- Ħrejjef ta' mingħul (1929)
- Għall-Imħabba (1938)
- Leli ta' Ħaż-Żgħir (1938) a psychological novel, the first of its kind in Maltese literature. Ellul Mercer describes how ignorance can lead to exploitation. In 2012, this novel was made into a documentary-drama in 13 episodes intended for the benefit of students in the form of an educational audiovisual series
- Taħt in-Nar (1949), his war diaries
- A collection of short stories (1929–1952)
- Naħal u Friefet (1949) (1957) - Being a two part anthology
- Il-Martirju ta' Poplu (1982) - A posthumously published collection of his works
- Firda minn Kelb

== Death ==
Ġużè Ellul Mercer died in Tas-Sliema on 22 September 1961, aged 64 years. This was during the Political-Religious question between the Labour Party and the Maltese church; as a member of the Labour Party executive, Ellul Mercer was interdicted by the church, and was buried in the non-consecrated section of the Addolorata Cemetery in Marsa. In 1986, a monument to Ellul Mercer was erected in Dingli. The monument is the work of notable local sculptor Anton Agius.
