= Anthony Borg Barthet =

Maltese judge

The Right Honourable Anthony Borg Barthet Judge

European Court of Justice

Personal details
- Born: 25 March 1947 (age 79) Valletta, Crown Colony of Malta

Anthony Borg Barthet (born 25 March 1947 in Valletta, Malta) is a Maltese judge at the European Court of Justice, and former Attorney General of Malta.

== Biography ==
He was born 25 March 1947 in Valletta, Malta to Victor Borg and Mary Barthet and is a nephew of the famous Maltese Artist Esprit Barthet (1919–1999) and has five siblings: Anna; Henry; Charles; Victor; Paul. He married Carmen Busuttil in 1974 and has three children Jacque; Maria Paula; and Justin.

He suffered a spinal injury in 1960 which disabled his left leg and was treated at Stoke Mandeville Hospital Rehabilitation Centre in Aylesbury, England.

He graduated in law in 1974 and joined the Civil Service in 1975. He transferred to the Malta Attorney General's office in 1978. He was senior counsel to the Republic in 1979 and assistant attorney general in 1988. He was appointed to the post of attorney general in 1989.

== Education ==
He studied at the Lyceum and then at the University of Malta. He was president of the students’ council between 1970 and 1971. He was an active member of Student Representative Council at Royal University of Malta (1968–1972), Secretary General (1968–1970), President 1971 Student Representative Faculty Board of Laws, Senate and Council. He was holder of the Redifusion Scholarship at the Royal University of Malta 1968–71. He received his Diploma as Notary Public in 1972 and his Doctor of Laws in 1973.

== Professional activity ==
Admitted to the bar in Malta 1974

- 1974–1975 – private practice as advocate – Valletta
- 1975–1978 – Notary to Government
- 1978–1979 – Counsel for the Republic
- 1979–1988 – Senior Counsel for the Republic
- 1988–1989 – Assistant Attorney General
- 1989–2004 – Attorney General

appeared for the Government of Malta in Civil and Constitutional Cases. Prosecuted before the Higher Criminal Courts in Malta.

Agent for the Government before the European Court of Human Rights, Strasbourg.

Represented Government of Malta in various committees of Council of Europe, at Commonwealth Law Ministries Conferences (New Zealand, Mauritius, Trinidad), European Minister of Justice Conferences (The Hague, Ottawa, Istanbul, Nicosia, Bucharest, Moldova, Lugano, Budapest, London, Prague, Malta, Morocco, Sofia) and at other meetings and in bilateral negotiations, co-chaired joint meetings OECD -Co-operative Jurisdiction on unfair tax practices.

== Merits ==
Honorary member of Romanian Union of Jurists since 1995. He is also an Official of the Italian Ordine al Merito della Repubblica, an award given by Italian President Scalfaro in 1995.

== Other activities ==
- 1987–1990 – Part-time lecturer in Civil Law, University of Malta
- 1994–2004 – Member Commission for the Administration of Justice
- 1998–2004 – Member Council University of Malta, Formerly member of Faculty Board of Laws
- 1998–2004 – Member of the board of governors of the Malta Arbitration Centre
- 2000–2004 – Member of the council of St John's Co-Cathedral Foundation

== Orders and decorations ==
- 1995 – Cavaliere Gran Ufficiale Ordine al Merito (Italy)
- 2000 – Cavaliere Gran Ufficiale Ordine Pro Merito Melitense (Sovereign Military Order of Malta)
- 2001 – Officer of Merit (Malta)
- 2004 – Cavaliere Gran Croce Ordine al Merito (Italy)

== See also ==
- List of members of the European Court of Justice
