= Church of the Nativity of Our Lady, Rabat =

Church of the Nativity of Our Lady
- Ta' Ġieżu
- Il-Knisja ta' Santa Marija ta' Ġesù
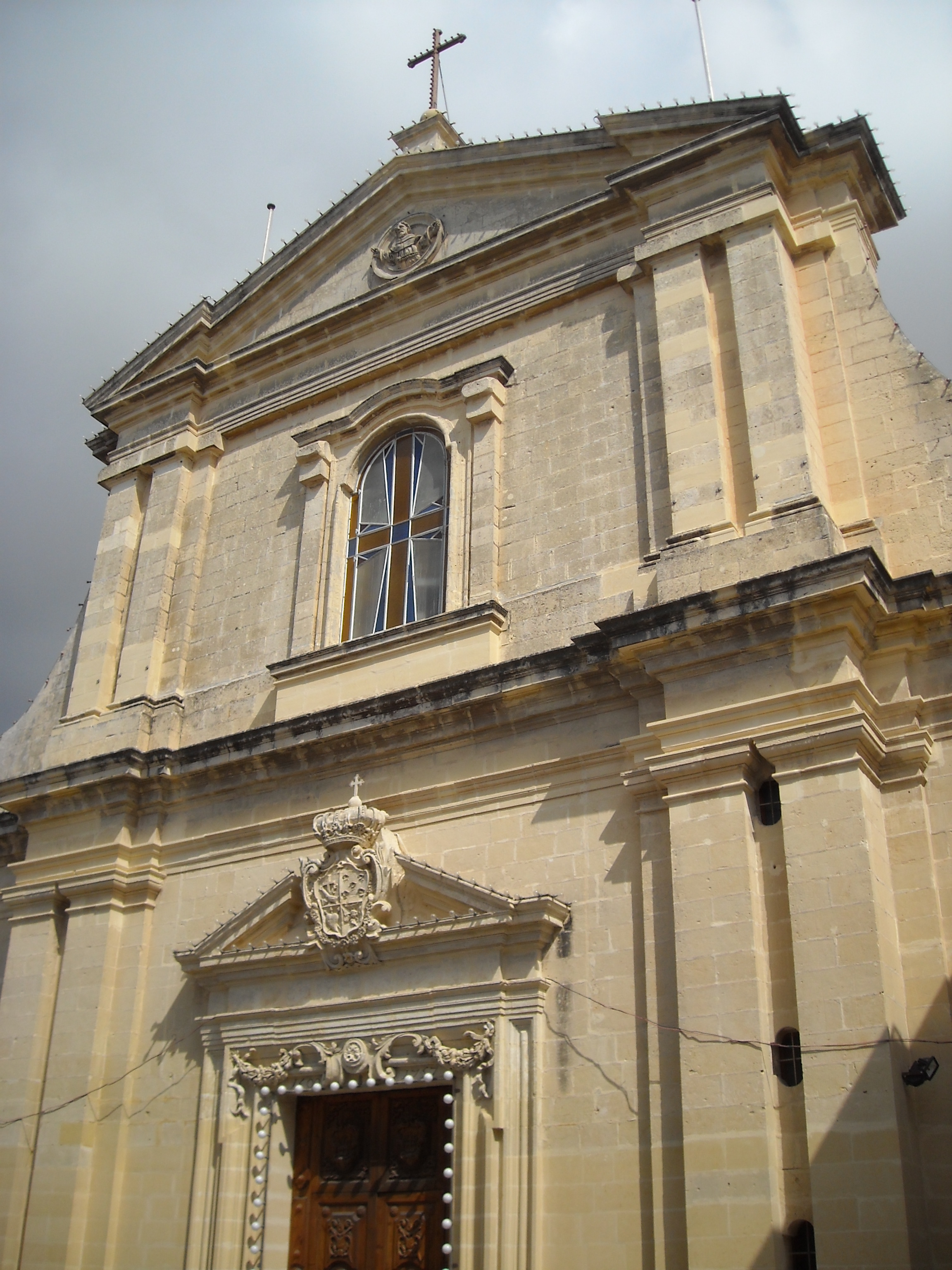
- Façade of the church
- Church of the Nativity of Our Lady
- 35°52′59.8″N 14°24′0.2″E
- Location: Rabat
- Country: Malta
- Denomination: Roman Catholic

History
- Status: Church
- Dedication: Nativity of Mary
- Dedicated: 31 October 1790

Architecture
- Functional status: Active
- Years built: 1500; 1757 (enlarged)

Specifications
- Materials: Limestone

Administration
- Archdiocese: Malta

The Church of the Nativity of Our Lady (Maltese: Il-Knisja ta' Santa Marija ta' Ġesù), commonly known as ta' Ġieżu, is a Roman Catholic church in Rabat, Malta. The church was built in 1500 and it was enlarged in 1757. It is adjoined by a Franciscan convent.

== History ==
The Franciscans opened their first friary in Malta in Rabat, having arrived on the islands in 1492. The church was built some years later in 1500. The first Hospitaller Grand Master in Malta, Philippe Villiers de L'Isle-Adam, had a room in the friary, and he died there in 1534. The room still exists and it has been restored. The church was enlarged in 1757 with the help of contributions from Italy, Spain and Portugal. It was dedicated on 31 October 1790.

Parts of the church and convent were restored in 2003.

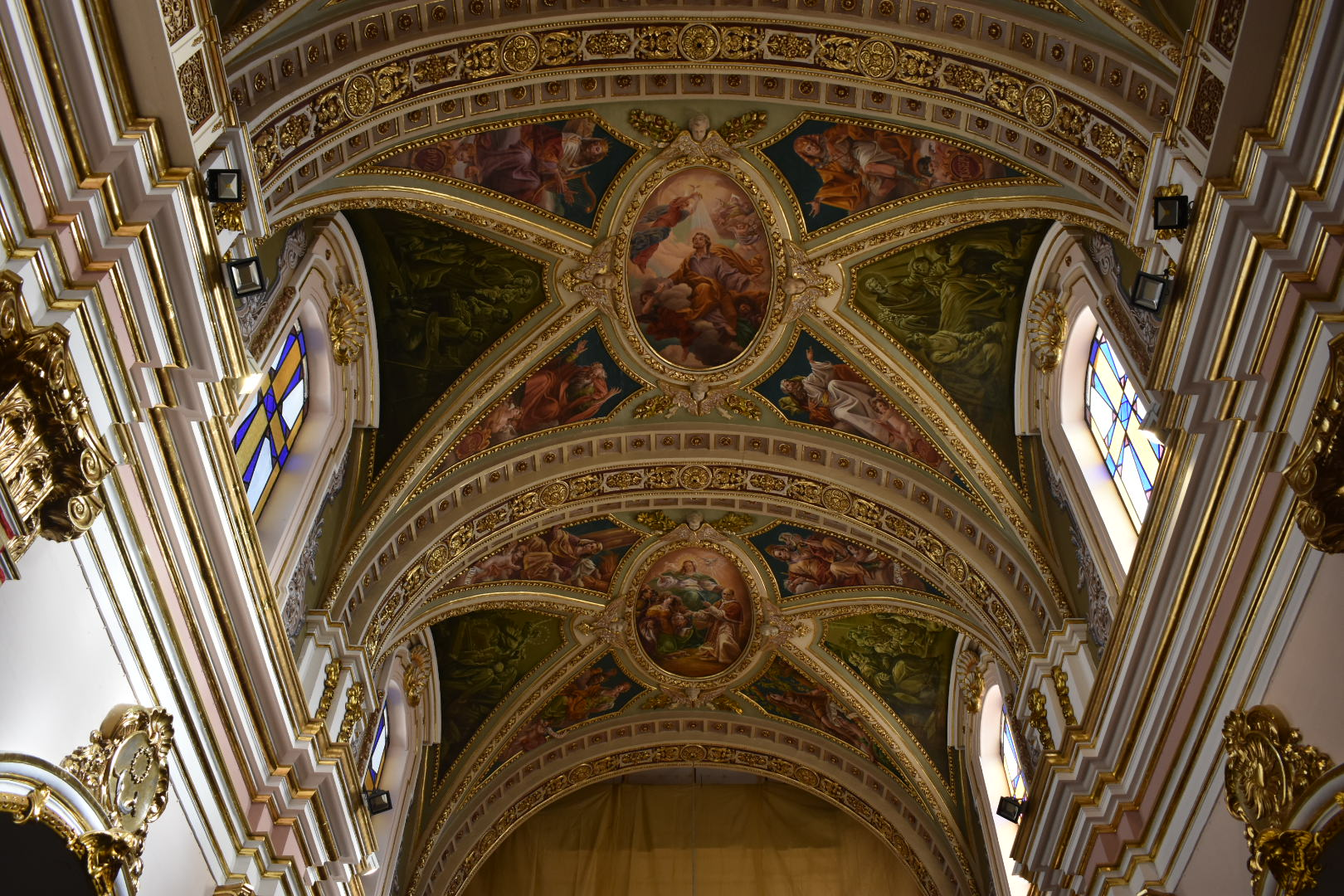
The church's frescoed interior

In the early hours of 23 August 2017, two wooden beams which were supporting part of the church's ceiling gave way, leaving a hole and destroying a fresco. Falling debris damaged the marble altar and some benches and light fittings, but no one was injured since the church was empty at the time. The building was closed for some time, although there was no immediate danger of further collapse. The Bank of Valletta has pledged to help in repairing the damage and restoring the church.

A temporary roof was built three weeks after the collapse. Planned permanent repair works initially considered the possibility of building a dome, which was included in the church's original design but was never built, but studies showed that the church's structure was not strong enough to support its weight. The ceiling is to be rebuilt, and the artist Adonai Camilleri Cauchi is to cover a false ceiling under it with new frescoes.

The church is listed on the National Inventory of the Cultural Property of the Maltese Islands.
