= Michele Guerrisi =

Italian sculptor and art historian (1893–1963)

Michele Guerrisi (23 February 1893 – 29 April 1963) was an Italian sculptor, painter and writer.

== Biography ==
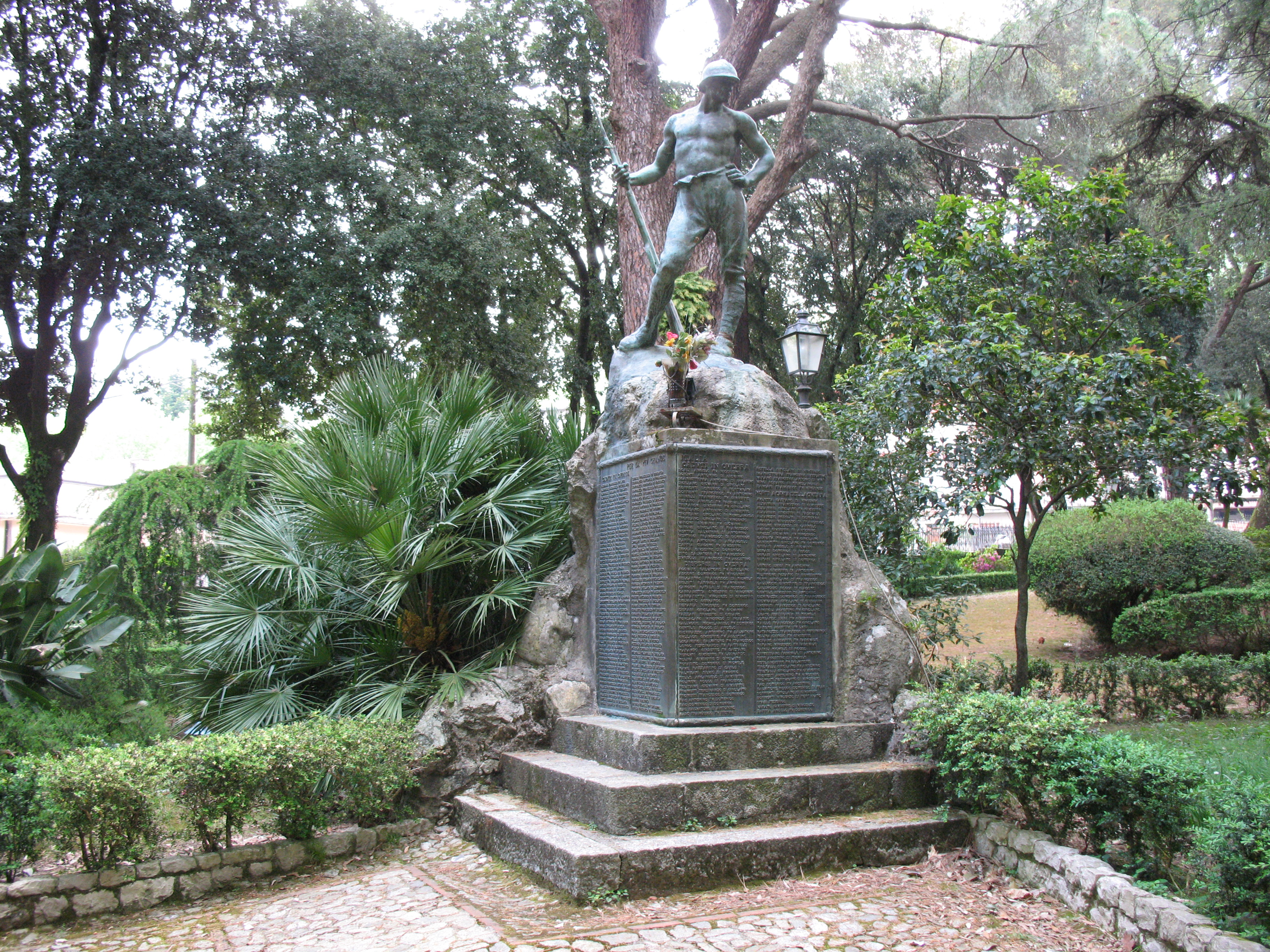
Monument to the fallen in the Villa comunale di Cittanova

At an early age, Michele Guerrisi moved to Palmi, where he attended the gymnasium and simultaneously practiced in the studio of the painter Domenico Augimeri. He subsequently attended high school Galileo Galilei in Florence.

During a stay in Naples he met Vincenzo Gemito, who encouraged him to pursue sculpture. He graduated in literature in 1916 at the University of Naples and simultaneously obtained a diploma in sculpture at the Accademia di Belle Arti di Roma. He followed the Crocian philosophy.

He taught art history at the Accademia Albertina in Turin from 1924 to 1945, where he had among his students Umberto Mastroianni.

During the Fascist era he worked mostly on war memorials to the dead of the First World War: in San Giuliano del Sannio (1923 ), in Cittanova (1924), in Siderno, in Montecalvo Irpino (1926), in Palmi (1929), in Luzzara (1930) and in Catanzaro (1933).

In 1926, during the IV Biennial of Calabrian Art, Guerrisi noticed the works of Andrea Cefaly junior and decided to take the young artist with him to Turin, at the Albertina Academy of Fine Arts, starting his career.

In 1943, he was a founding member, together with Adriano Sicbaldi (his teaching colleague), Ermanno Politi and the sculptor Renzo Moscatelli, of the so-called Cherasco Group.

He was also a painter and writer, author of some books of history and art criticism, of an autobiography, useful to trace the iter of his artistic formation. He published a history of Cinquefrondi, and authored some books on history and art criticism.

The Gipsoteca Michele Guerrisi of Palmi holds a number of his works, mostly maquettes in plaster, and some watercolours donated by his wife.

He died on 29 April 1963 in Rome. Some of his work was shown during the ninth Quadriennale di Roma in 1965–1966.

== Expositions ==
Guerrisi was present at the Venice Biennial of 1934 and 1936 (with his sculptures: Figura femminile inginocchiata and Donna negra, with which he was awarded).

In 1937, he exhibited a portrait of Gloria Alcorta at the Exhibition of Italian Art from 1800 to the present day held in Berlin.

Between 1931 and 1956 he participated in the first seven editions of the Quadrennial of Rome; At the IX Quadrennial (1965), two years after his death, a retrospective exhibition was dedicated to him. He also participated in 1953 in the collective exhibition Art in the life of Southern Italy at the Palazzo delle Esposizioni in Rome.

== Monuments ==
He was the author of public monuments such as:

- Mausoleo di Francesco Cilea
- Monumento agli studenti caduti per l'Università, Naples, 1923
- Monumento ai caduti, Cittanova, 1924
- Monumento ai caduti della Ia Guerra Mondiale, Siderno, 1924
- Monumento ai caduti, Montecalvo Irpino, 1926
- Monumento ai caduti, Castellabate, 1926
- Monumento al poeta Ibico, Reggio Calabria
- Monumento ai Caduti, Palmi
- Monumento ai caduti, Catanzaro, 1933
- Monumento al beato Felice, Nicosia, 1956

== Gallery ==
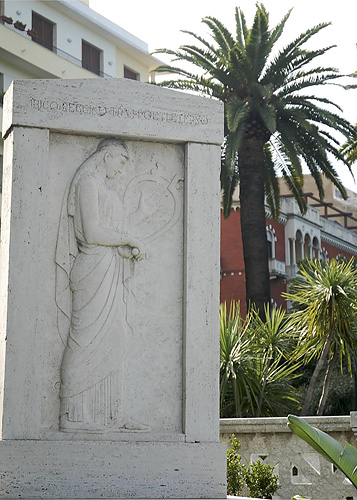
Il monumento a Ibico a Reggio Calabria

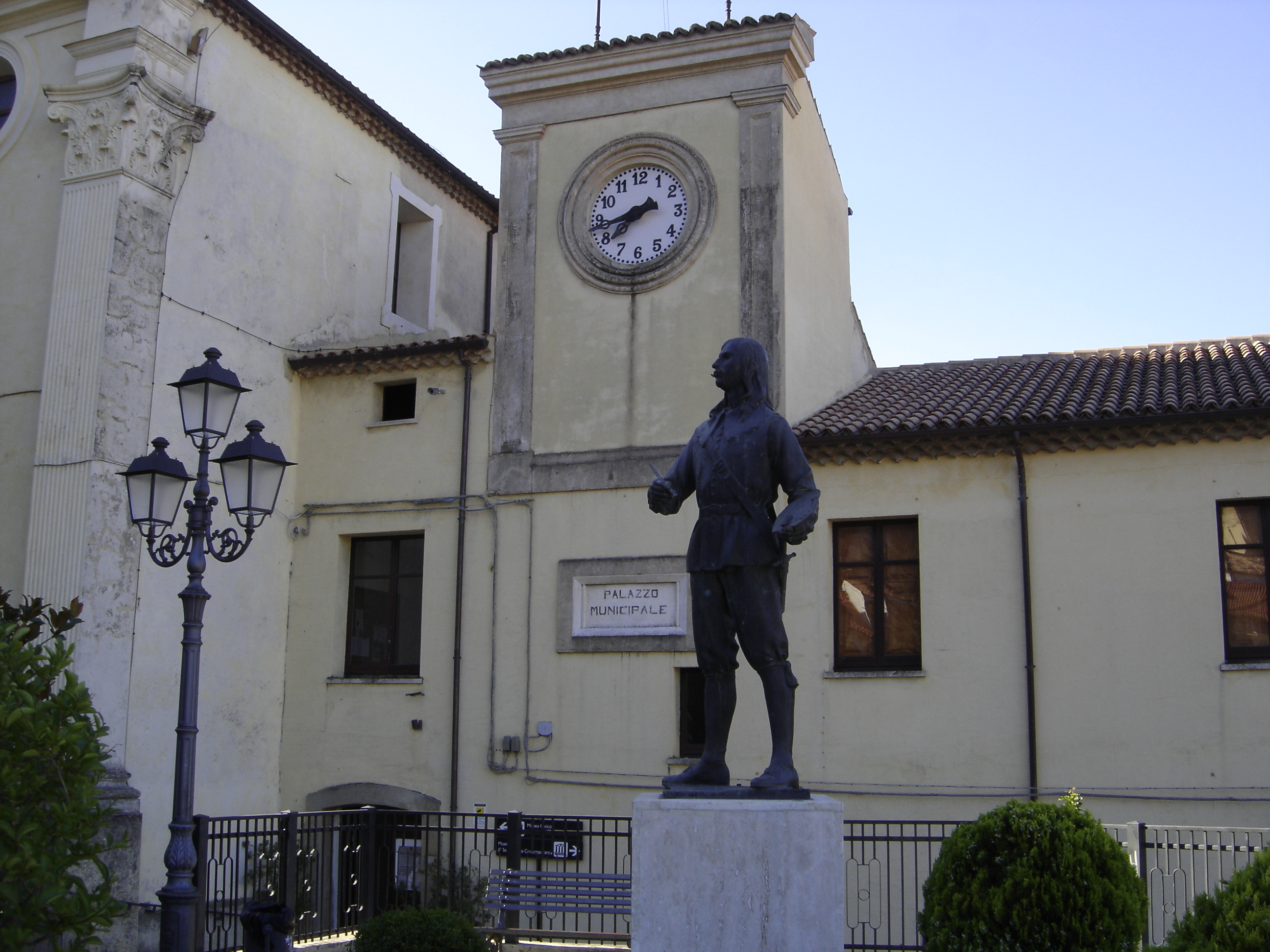
Il monumento a Mattia Preti a Taverna

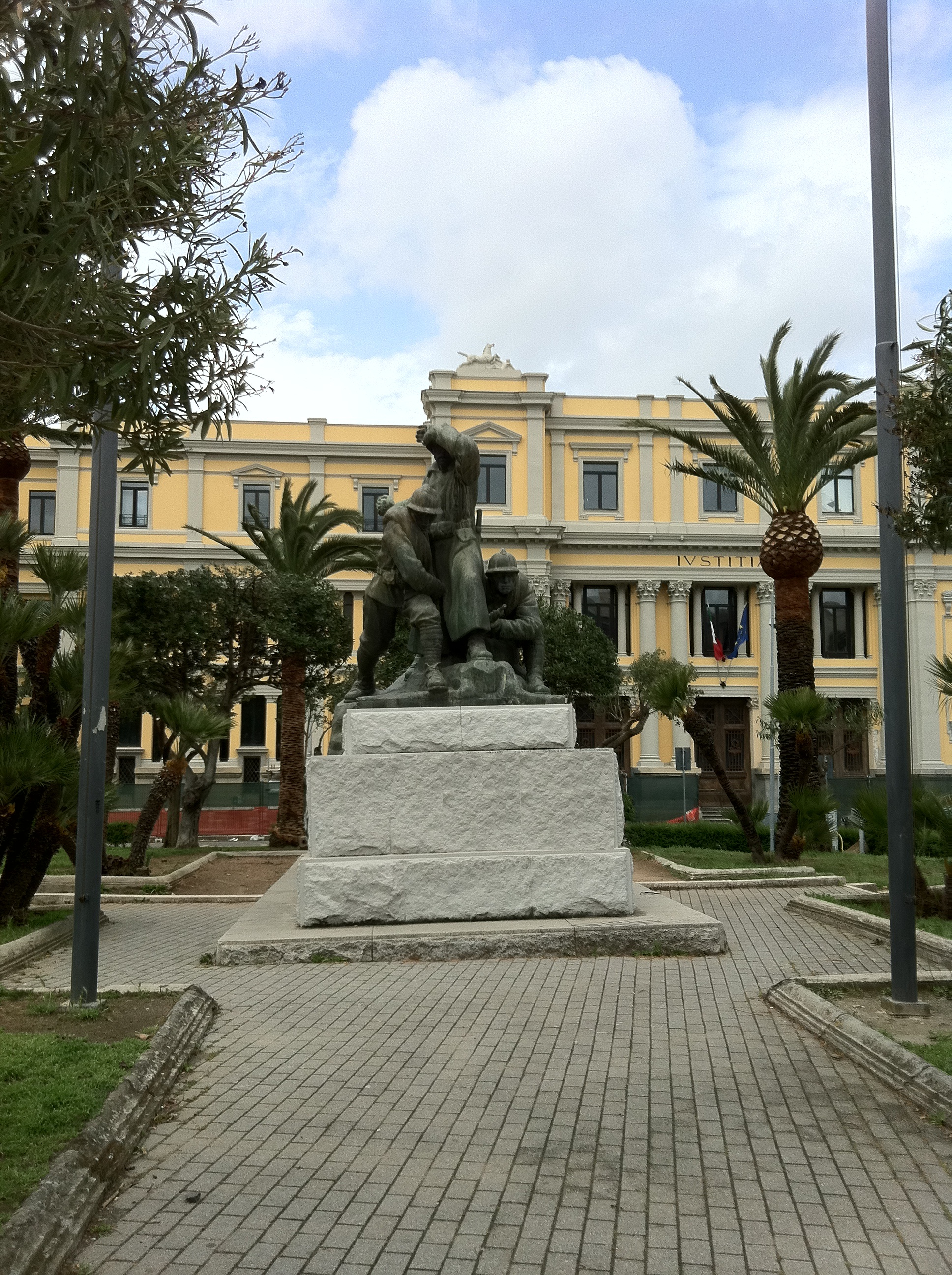
Il monumento ai caduti di Catanzaro

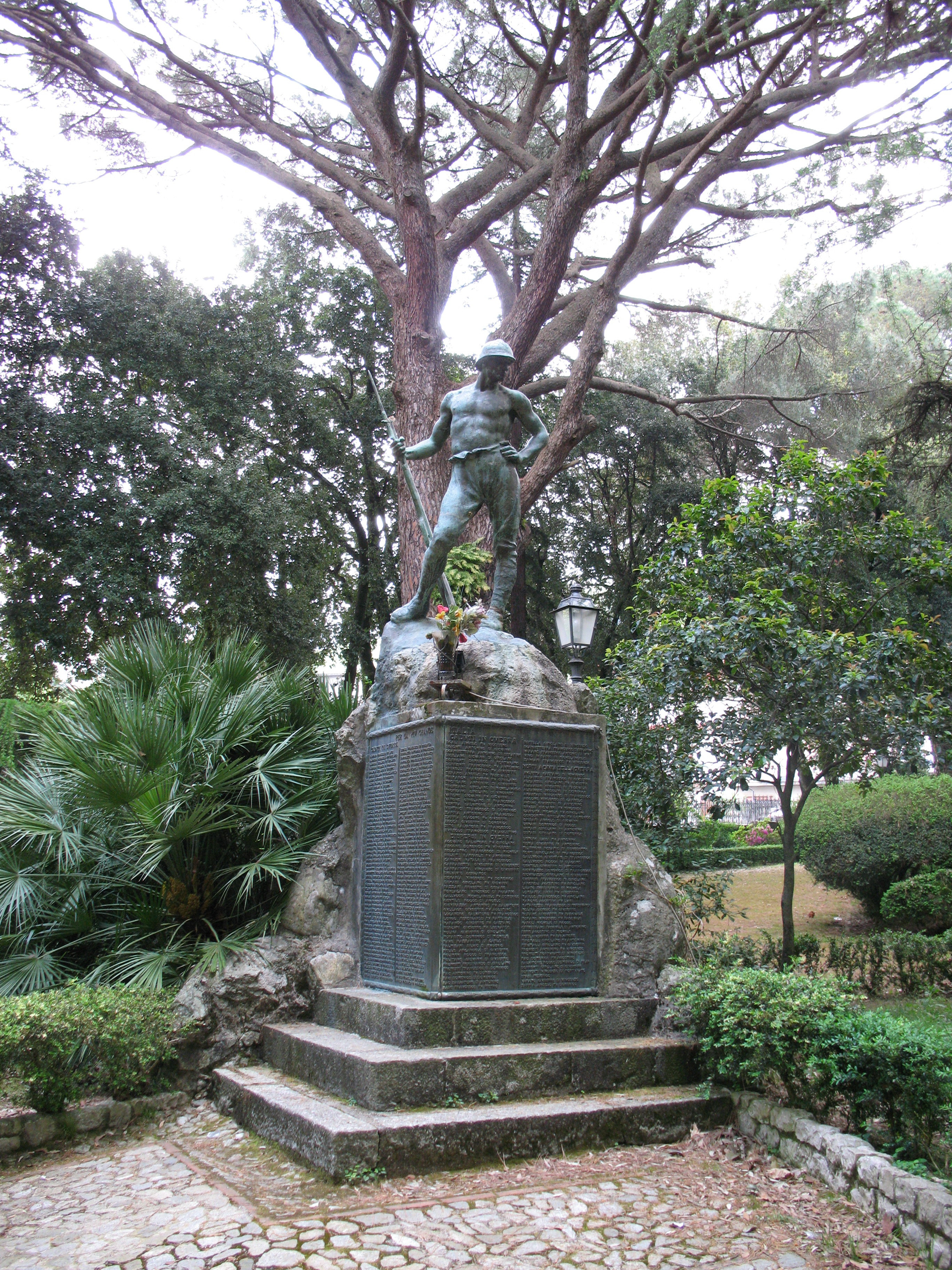
Il monumento ai caduti di Cittanova

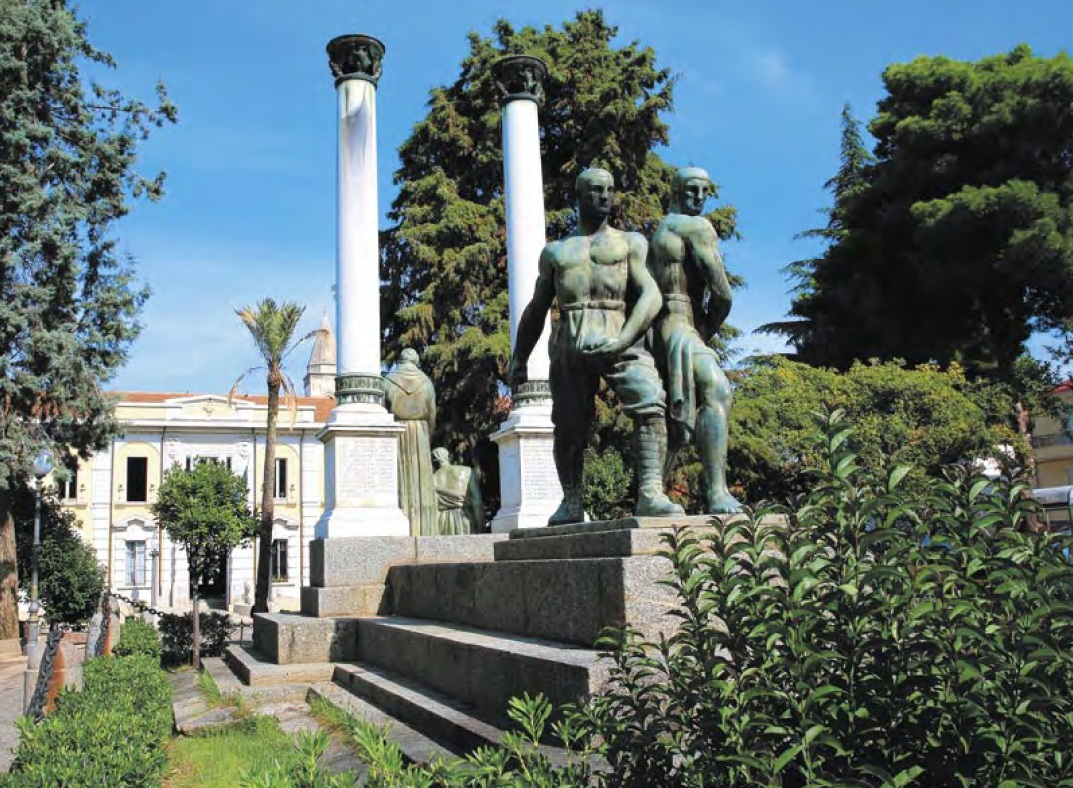
Il monumento ai Caduti di Palmi

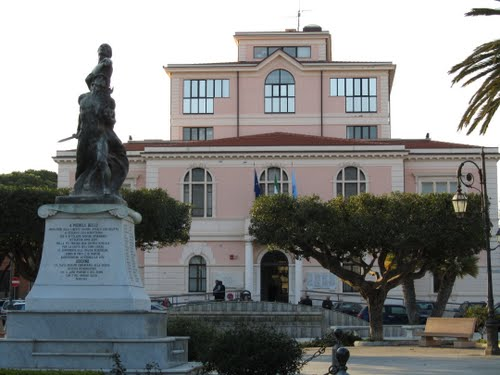
Il monumento ai caduti di Siderno

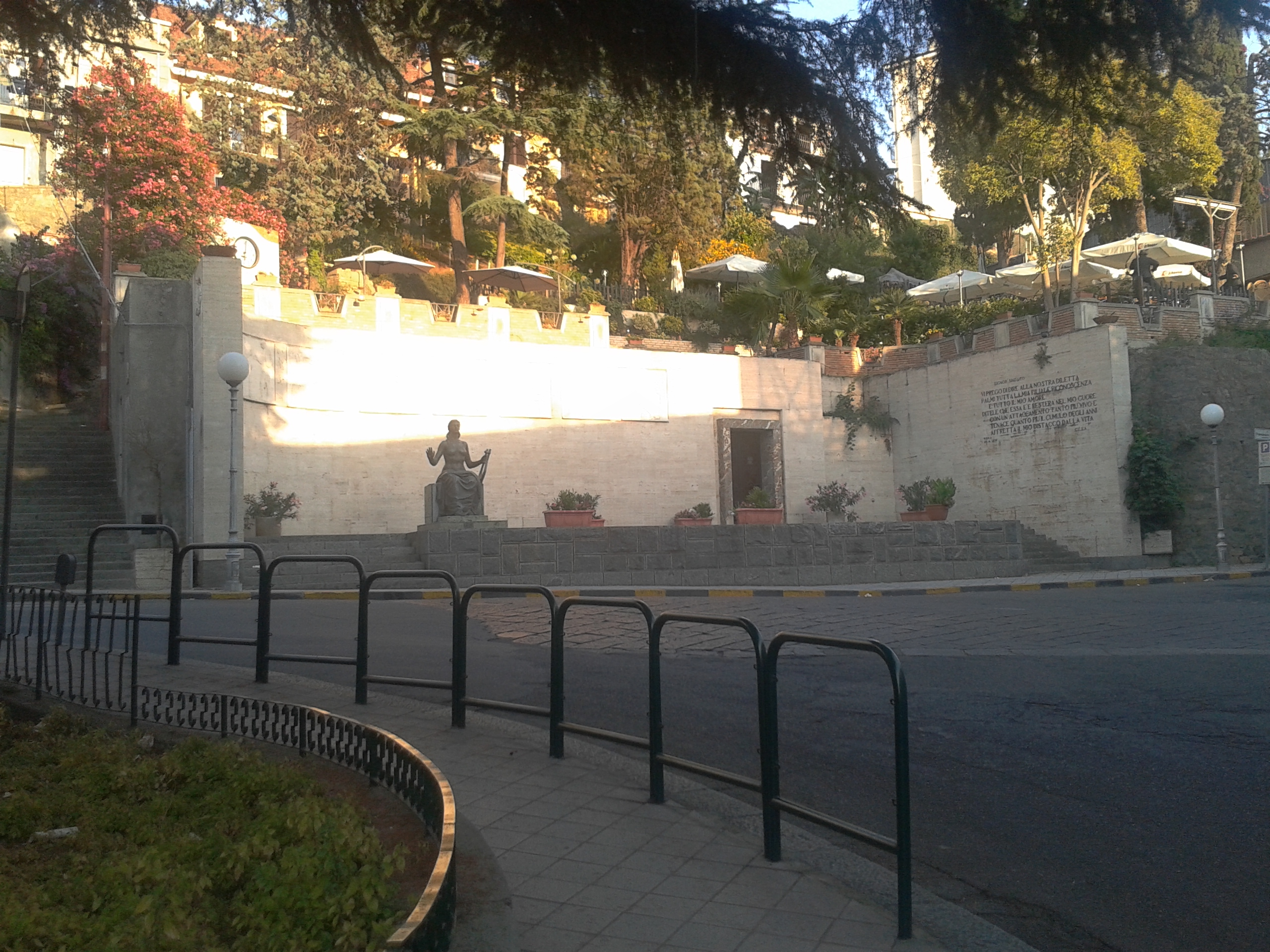
Il mausoleo a Palmi

== Artworks in museums ==
The Galleria civica d'arte moderna e contemporanea of Turin possesses the work Swimmer, exposed to the Venetian Biennial of 1934. A Portrait of Italo Cremona exhibited at the next edition (1936) was instead purchased by the Gallery of Modern Art of Milan.

Some vedute of Rome are in the Galleria Comunale d'Arte Moderna of Rome.

== Publications ==
- Dalle botteghe agli studi, Torino: Le Arti Belle, 1926
- Discorsi su la scultura, Torino: L'Erma, 1930
- Il Giudizio di Michelangelo, Rome: AVE, 1947
- L'idea figurativa, Milan: Mondadori
- L'errore di Cèzanne, Pisa: Nistri/Lischi, 1954.

== Acknowledgments ==
Michele Guerrisi has been entitled the Gipsoteca of Palmi, which houses plaster casts of his works and several watercolors offered by his wife, the Scientific High School of Cittanova, the Artistic High School of Palmi and the Technical Institute for Surveyors and Social Activities of Reggio Calabria Righi-Guerrisi. In addition, a square in Cittanova and two streets in Palmi and Cinquefrondi were named after him.
