= Isabelle Borg =

British-Maltese artist

- Born: 7 September 1959; London, United Kingdom
- Died: 23 September 2010 (aged 51); Floriana, Malta
- Education: Camberwell College of Arts, University of Malta
- Known for: Painting
- Notable work: Lovers in the Bull, 1984
- Website: http://www.isabelleborg.com/

Isabelle Borg (7 September 1959 - 23 September 2010) was a British-Maltese artist. Her work has appeared in several exhibitions in Malta and internationally. Borg was born in London in 1959 to a Maltese father and Italian mother. She studied painting at the Camberwell College of Arts, London, graduating BA (Hons) in 1986. She obtained an MA (History of Art) in 1994 and taught art at the University of Malta. She spent periods of her life in Berlin and West Cork, Ireland apart from Malta. Borg set up the Moviment Mara Maltija (Maltese Women's Movement) in the late 1980s and later became its president.

Borg exhibited her work in solo and group exhibitions internationally between 1985 and 2008. Notable exhibitions include her first solo exhibition at the National Museum of Archaeology, Malta in 1985, a solo exhibition at the Bank of Ireland Arts Centre in Dublin, Ireland in 2002 and two solo exhibitions at the Durham University in 1998 and 1999. A retrospective exhibition which featured her most notable work entitled 'Lover in the Bull' and a portrait of late journalist Daphne Caruana Galizia, was held at Saint James Cavalier in 2021.

== Personal life ==
Isabelle Borg was born in London in 1959 to a Maltese father and Italian mother. Borg travelled to Italy and later settled in London, before moving to Malta at the age of 14. Borg returned to London in 1979, where amongst others, she joined Decca Records as a graphic designer and typographer where she designed record sleeves until 1980. In 1982, she entered the Camberwell College of Arts where she graduated with a BA (Hons) in Fine Art Painting. On her return to Malta in 1988, she graduated with an M.A. in History of Art from the University of Malta, which she later joined as an Assistant Lecturer in Fine Art.

== Art and career ==
Isabelle Borg regularly exhibited her work both in Malta and internationally, in Ireland, England and Germany, amongst others. Her first work was exhibited at the National Museum of Fine Arts in Malta in 1985. She participated in various group exhibitions and had her research published.

One of her most notable works entitled 'Lovers in the Bull' was described by the Malta Council for Culture and the Arts (now Arts Council Malta) as "a milestone in Maltese twentieth century art,” which “quickly asserted itself as one of the foremost works by a Maltese artist inspired by the imagery of Malta’s prehistoric past.” The painting features a prehistoric motif of a bull, inspired by the prehistoric art found in Malta, with a depiction of the two lovers intertwined in the bull's belly.

Borg's landscapes were described as 'abstract landscapes ' where 'the meticulous study of the construction of spaces, situate her work between reality and spectacle'. Borg's landscapes featured predominantly Maltese and Irish scenes, clearly influenced by Borg's love of the two countries. This is also made evident by several solo exhibitions in the two countries, including Saint James Cavalier, University of Malta, Malta Museum of Fine Arts (now MUŻA), The Bank of Ireland Arts Centre and Grey College, Durham.

Other notable subjects in Borg's art included nudes, abstracts and portraits.

== Activism and Feminism ==
Isabelle Borg set up and was elected President of Moviment Mara Maltija (Maltese Women's Movement), a Maltese Non-governmental organization that aimed to speak out and bring awareness to injustice and inequality in Malta.

Borg was also active in other NGOs focusing on women's rights. Besides her work with Moviment Mara Maltija, Borg wrote privately about the situation of over-crowdedness and under-staffing at Dar Merħba Bik, a Maltese NGO that provides assistance to women who have experienced domestic violence which later led to the NGO's first fundraising events.

Borg's feminism is also evident in her art. When she was invited to exhibit a painting in a collective exhibition called 'Nude in Maltese Art', Rather than present a female nude, Borg presented a painting called 'Standing Nude', depicting a pair of black high heels occupying an empty alcove that stood in her studio in Floriana. In the context of the collection dominated by male artists who largely presented female nudes, Borg's work was considered a refusal to objectify the female form.

In her later life, Borg became an environmental activist, criticising construction works having been personally impacted by the effect of construction next door at a time when she was suffering from Idiopathic pulmonary fibrosis. Borg also criticised the disregard to heritage value in planning applications for the demolition of historical buildings.

== Death ==
Borg died in Malta in September 2010, having suffered from Idiopathic pulmonary fibrosis, a degenerative disease which became terminal. She spent the final years of her life working from her studio in Floriana.
