= St John's Square =

Square in Valletta, Malta

Coordinates: 35°53′51″N 14°30′44″E

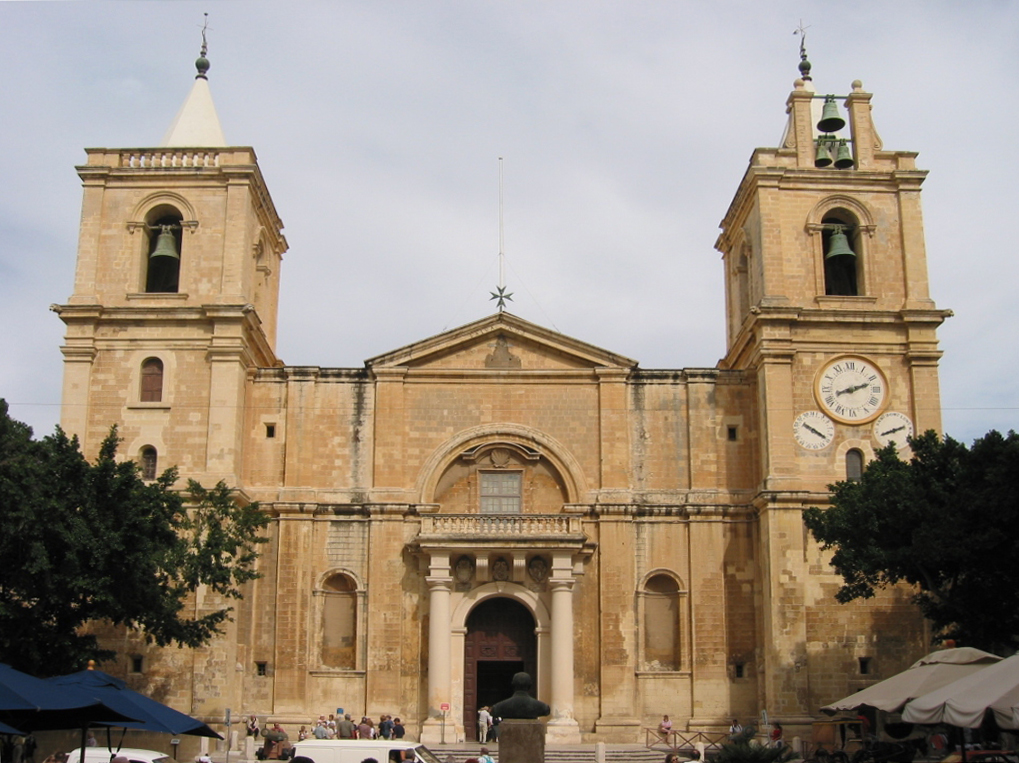
St John's Co-Cathedral

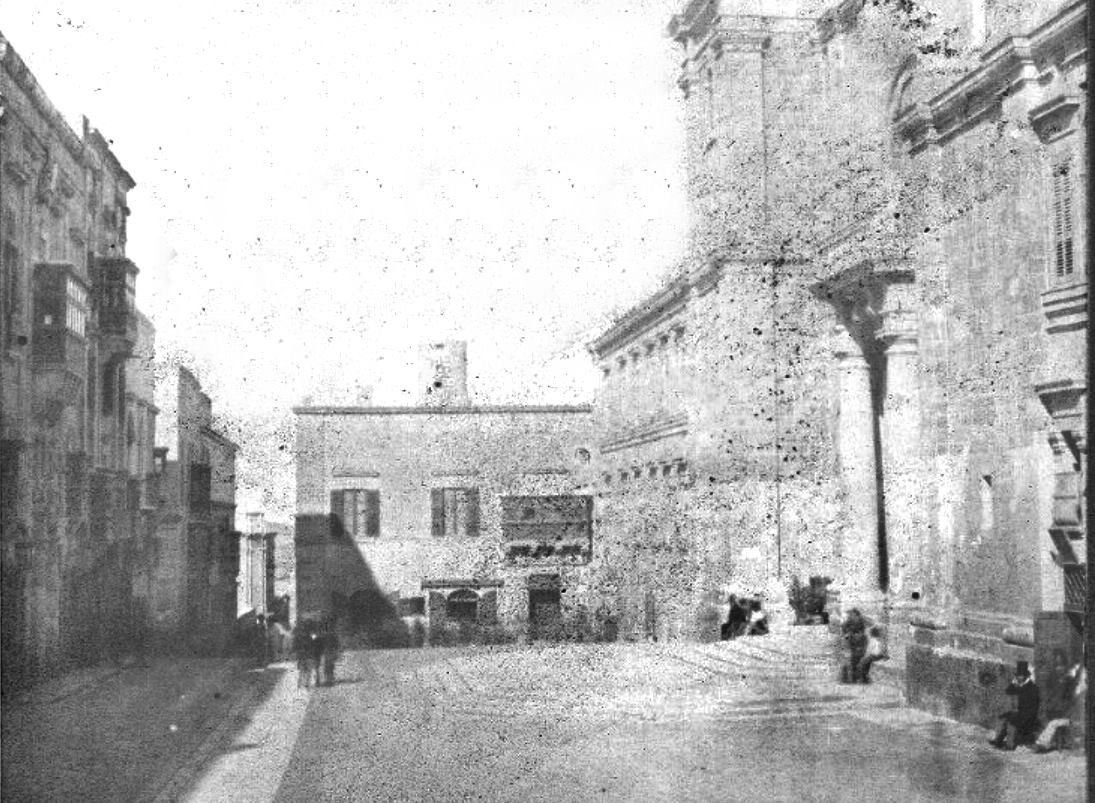
St John's Square in 1846, by Calvert Jones

St John's Square (Maltese: Pjazza San Ġwann, or Piazza san Giovanni) is found in front of St John's Co-Cathedral in Valletta, the capital of Malta. It has several outdoor cafés, surrounded by a graceful arcade.

In the middle of the square, facing the parvis and entrance to the cathedral, there is a small monument to former prime minister of Malta Enrico Mizzi, sculpted in 1964 by Vincent Apap (1909–2003). To the left and right of the cathedral entrance, are the Lion and Unicorn fountains, sculpted out of the native limestone by Maltese sculptor Mariano Gerada (1766–1823), which originally featured water transported to Valletta from the highlands around Mdina by means of the Wignacourt Aqueduct.

Although this pjazza is today a favourite meeting place in the heart of Malta's baroque capital city, its origins are relatively recent. It did not form part of the original plans of the city, as drafted by the Knights' architect, Francesco Laparelli. Prior to the Second World War, two large apartment buildings with street-level store fronts stood on this location, divided by the narrow street then referred to as Strada San Zaccaria (now, Triq San Żakkarija). However, these buildings suffered massive damage due to aerial bombardment during the War. During the reconstruction years following the War, the Government of Malta requisitioned the central portion of both these buildings, to create the square that exists today.

St. John's Square is one of the few "green" areas in Valletta, as it has several large ficus trees that were planted along the facade of the cathedral in the 1920s. A decision to remove some or all of these trees due to the potential damage that their roots might cause to the cathedral's priceless marble floors, was met with considerable public outcry. These trees are considered an important bird area for the white wagtail, which migrates from European breeding grounds every year to spend the winter in the Mediterranean, the Middle East and northeastern Africa. This decision is being challenged by, among others, the Valletta Rehabilitation Project, whose executive co-ordinator has been quoted as saying, "St John's is mostly built on solid rock, so there are no vaults through which the roots could penetrate the church as has been suggested."
