= Emvin Cremona =

Maltese artist

Emanuel Vincent "Emvin" Cremona
- Born: 27 May 1919; Valletta, Malta
- Died: 29 January 1987 (aged 67); Valletta, Malta
- Known for: Artist and stamp designer
- Spouse: Lilian Gatt
- Children: 4

Emanuel Vincent "Emvin" Cremona (27 May 1919 – 29 January 1987) was a Maltese artist and stamp designer. He was as one of Malta's leading artists of the 20th century, and a pioneer of modernism in Malta. Cremona is known for designing most Maltese stamps from 1957 to the 1980s, including the stamp issue commemorating Malta's independence from Great Britain in 1964. He studied at the Malta School of Arts and the Regia Accademia delle Belle Arti in Rome. Some of his works can be found at the parish churches of Msida and Ħamrun, Ta' Pinu Sanctuary, Our Lady of Lourdes parish in Paola and the Chapel of the Malta International Airport. The World Health Organization headquarters in Geneva and the United Nations Headquarters in New York also house paintings by Cremona.

Emanuel Vincent Cremona (his Christian names were informally shortened to Emvin from birth) was born in Valletta on May 27, 1919. Up to 1936 he attended the Scuola Umberto I for his formal education. In 1933, he was taken to Rome where he was overwhelmed by the experience. Later he attended the School of Art, finding himself in a class that composed Willie Apap, Anton Inglott, Esprit Barthet, and Victor Diacono. Their teachers were Edward Caruana Dingli and Carmenu Mangion, both of a mixed classicist and Romantic temperament.

At an early age, Cremona used to participate in the annual shows of the Malta Amateur Art Association. In 1937 he competed for the Government scholarship, placing third after Willie Apap and Anton Inglott. He went to Rome for a course of studies at the Regia Accademia di Belle Arti under Carlo Siviero between 1938 and 1940. In Rome he felt a closeness, a spiritual kinship to Anton Inglott. The two young artists were still in Rome just before Italy entered the war in 1940 but they returned to Malta together on the last boat to reach the island in peacetime.

In 1945 he won the Agnes Schembri Bequest, enabling him to proceed to London and Paris to deepen his studies in art. Between 1945 and 1947 he attended classes at the Slade School of Fine Art and later he attended lessons at the Parisian Ecole Superieur de Beaux Arts under professor Jean Dupas. Emvin returned to Malta in 1948. He represented the country in their first pavilion at the Venice Biennale in 1958. He married Lilian Gatt and had four children.

== See also ==
- Designers of Maltese stamps
- Postage stamps and postal history of Malta
