= Antoine Camilleri (artist) =

Maltese artist

Antoine Camilleri MQR
- Born: 5 February 1922; Valletta, Malta
- Died: 23 November 2005 (aged 83)
- Education: École Superieure des Beaux Arts
- Website: Official Website of Antoine Camilleri

Antoine Camilleri MQR, (5 February 1922 – 23 November 2005) was a Maltese artist and art teacher who made a lasting impact on the development of Maltese modern and contemporary art. He retains a special and unique place in Maltese Contemporary Art, mainly of a spirited father, loving teacher and as an artist who matured through the hardship of life. Camilleri's work is very personal, usually drawing from events or experiences in the artist's life. His self-image in particular is repeated throughout his work using various media including, oils, lino prints, clay and objet trouvé. Throughout the years, Antoine Camilleri experimented with a variety of media and he will be mostly remembered for his unique style as pictures in clay involving the working and manipulation of clay and its dry cracked textures.

== Personal life ==
Antoine Camilleri was born in Valletta to a Maltese father and a French-Algerian mother, the sixth of 11 children. Later in life the artist learned that he was born two months premature which he cites as being the reason he and his mother were so close. His father, a successful clothing merchant with an outlet in Valletta's St John's Square, realised his son's artistic ambitions and supported him throughout his career. In May 1954 his mother died and this had a lasting impact on the artist, many years later producing a work titled Gieħ lil Ommi (Homage to My Mother), 1982. In June of the same year Camilleri married Tereza née Tanti and together they had 5 children. His family feature in a number of his works.

Apart from being an artist Camilleri was also an art teacher. His career spanned from 1956 to 1979, where he taught at various institutions including teaching the Foundation Course in the Faculty of Architecture at the University of Malta.

== Early years ==
He became interested in art at a young age and received his earliest artistic training, aged 10, under Dwardu Zammit, who introduced him to the medium of oil painting. In 1936 he started attending the Malta Government School of Art studying under Vincent Apap, Edward Caruana Dingli, Carmelo Mangion and Carmel Attard Cassar. This was briefly interrupted by the war when he was conscripted with the 2nd Regiment, King's Own Malta Regiment, however Camilleri continued to attend lessons, where possible, until 1947.

== Paris ==
In 1948 and with the help of his father, Antoine went to study at the École Superieure des Beaux Arts in Paris. There he came under the influence of his teacher Nicolas Untersteller, a respected artist from Alsace who between 1939 and 1945 was the Director of the École des Beaux Arts. Untersteller was a specialist in stained glass, a medium which Antoine would experiment with in later years.

In Paris, Antoine was exposed to modern painting and the work of the Impressionists. The intellectual stimulating atmosphere of the city reinforced his vision, he painted many landscapes en-plein-air, but truly loved drawing and painting from live models. These studies reveal the artist's developing style, characterised by the flow and economy of line as well as a sense of elongation.

== Self-Portraits ==
With over 80 documented self-portraits produced, during different stages of his artistic career, Camilleri ranks as Malta's most revered self-portraitist who defined himself and his art through the promulgation of his own image. Antoine Camilleri's introspective nature is widely explored in his self-portraits. The artist recorded his physiognomic progression and experiences through the painted self-portraits. As a result, the depicted self-representations mediate the spiritual, intellectual and artistic psyche of the artist. He presented himself to the viewer in a series of moods and intensive looks, sharing joyful and difficult moments from his personal life. Camilleri's self-portraits acted as a therapeutic antidote where he exposes his inner self as if in an act of confession. Camilleri in his self-portraits sheds all religious inhibitions and disregards any conservative criticism by depicting himself in the guise of the resurrected Christ exposing the stigmata. The artist further elaborates on the idea of self-definition by incorporating in his works readymade objects, things that he was acquainted with in his studio or in his house. He petrified these found-objects with resin, and eternalised them to be viewed as natura morta itself, becomes the work of art. Camilleri does not tamper with, interpret or modify his surroundings from their pure state of being; he simply immortalises them and shares them with the viewer as part of his memory, as an extension of the self.

== New Realism ==
Antoine Camilleri experimented many forms of art, one of his experiments was the introduction of "objet trouve". Real food such as bread, cheese and wine were preserved forerever in his works concealed under a film of resin. Dr Joseph Paul Cassar contends that Camilleri anticipated New Realism artist, Daniel Spoerri’s famous breakthrough, known as his ‘snare pictures’ (tableaux piège), in which he fixed the remains of the ordinarily mundane, such as the constituents of a meal, crockery and glassware, in vertical tableaus. Camilleri evidently had embarked on such experimentation prior to the Swiss artist, as shown in Camilleri’s similarly themed work. Cassar states that he approached major art institutions with this claim and none of them negated its veracity. This adds another layer to the relevance of Camilleri as an artist of international importance.

== Exhibitions ==
Camilleri was among the first Maltese artists to exhibit in the Venice Biennale in the country's inaugural pavilion in 1958.

== Health and death ==
The artist suffered from various health problems throughout his life, in 1972 he had a heart attack which forced him to stop teaching for a short period of time. Later, in 1978, he underwent major surgery which he memorialised in a work called After Surgery, 1983. In 1996 Camilleri went through a by-pass, later producing a work titled After the By-Pass, 1999, in which he included the surgical knife that was used during the operation.

In 2003 he was diagnosed with Parkinson's disease and took up residence at St. Vincent de Paul Long Term Care Facility.

Antoine Camilleri died on 23 November 2005.
