= Senglea =

Senglea L-Isla Città Invicta, Civitas Invicta
- City and local council
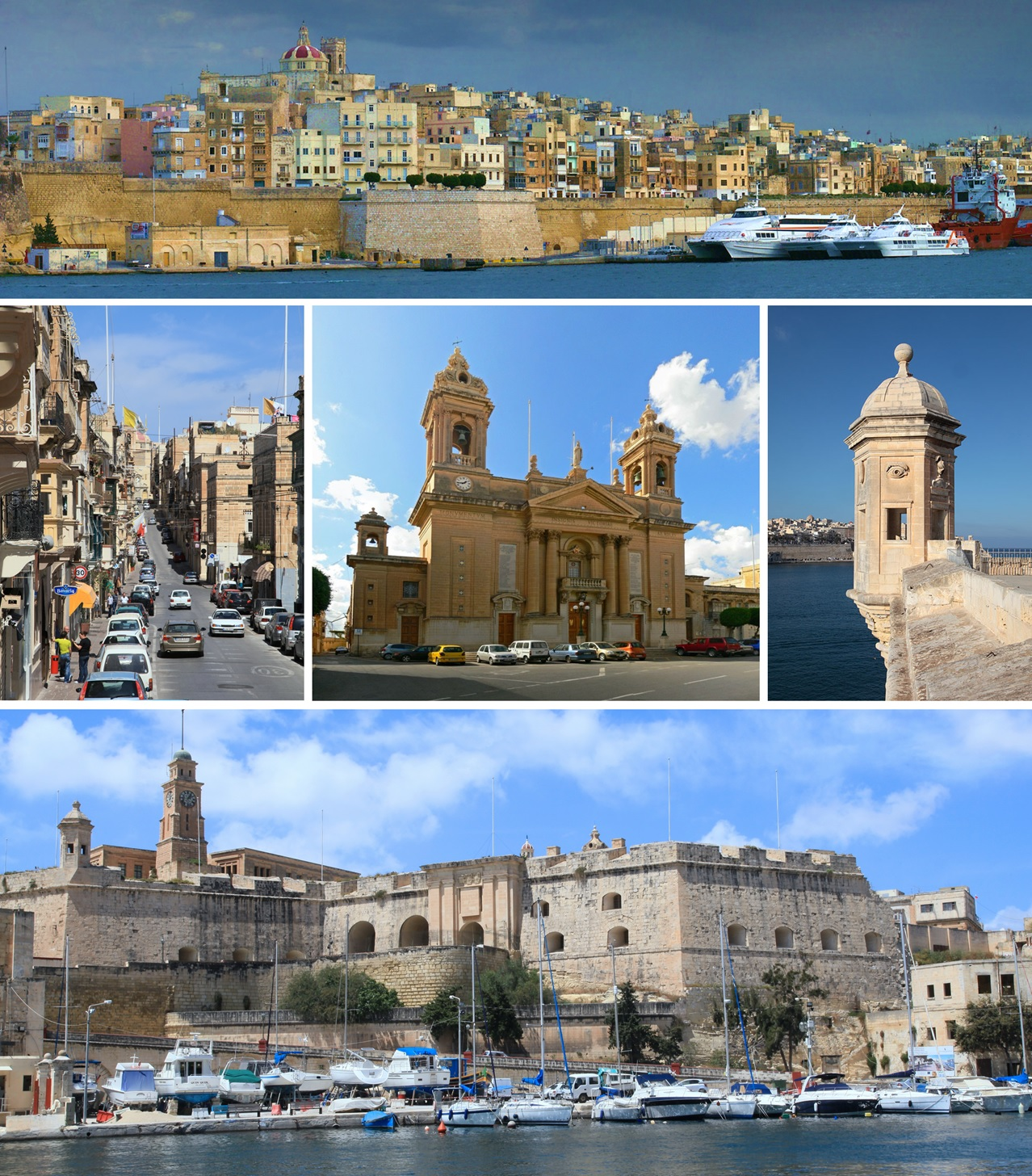
- From top: Skyline, typical street, Parish Church, Gardjola, Land Front

- Flag Coat of arms
- Motto: Civitas Invicta (Belt Qatt Mirbuħa) (Unconquered City)
- Location within Malta Location within Mediterranean
- Coordinates: 35°53′16″N 14°31′1″E
- Country: Malta
- Region: Port Region
- District: Southern Harbour District
- Borders: Cospicua

Government
  - Mayor: Clive Pulis (PL)

Area
  - Total: 0.2 km^{2} (0.077 sq mi)

Population (Jul. 2024)
  - Total: 2,408
  - Density: 12,000/km^{2} (31,000/sq mi)
- Demonym(s): Senglean (m), Sengleana (f), Sengleani (pl); Isolan (m), Isolana (f), Isolani (pl)
- Time zone: UTC+1 (CET)
  - Summer (DST): UTC+2 (CEST)
- Postal code: ISL
- Dialing code: 356
- ISO 3166 code: MT-20
- Patron saint: Marija Bambina; Christ the Redeemer
- Day of festa: 8 September; Third Sunday of June
- Website: Official website

Senglea (Maltese: L-Isla [ˈlɪslɐ]), also known by its title Città Invicta (or Civitas Invicta), is a fortified city in the Port Region of Malta. It is one of the Three Cities in the Grand Harbour area, the other two being Cospicua and Vittoriosa, and has a population of approximately 2,720 people. The city's title Città Invicta (lit. invincible city) was given because it managed to resist the Ottoman invasion at the Great Siege of Malta in 1565. The name Senglea comes from the Grand Master who built it, Claude de la Sengle, and gave the city a part of his name. While Senglea is the 52nd most populated locality on the island, due to its incredibly small land area, it is the 2nd most densely populated locality after Sliema.

In Senglea, locals speak the Cottonera dialect.

Senglea was part of a town named Birmula. When the order of St John came to Malta they planned to build 3 cities from this land. It started from Senglea, then Vittoriosa and Cospicua. The rest of the land was named Cottonera and it was surrounded with the Cottonera lines.

== History ==
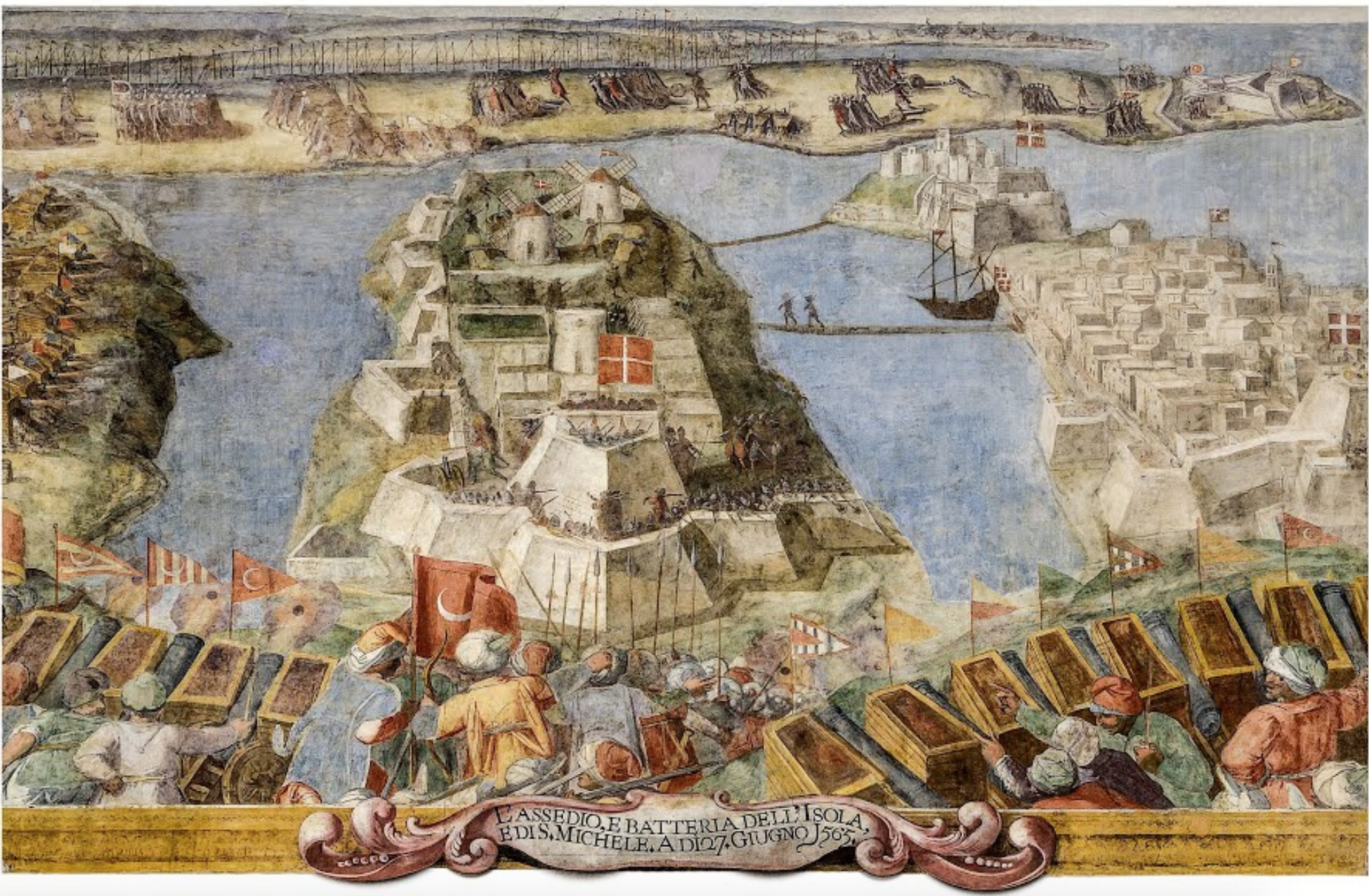
Senglea during the Great Siege of Malta in 1565

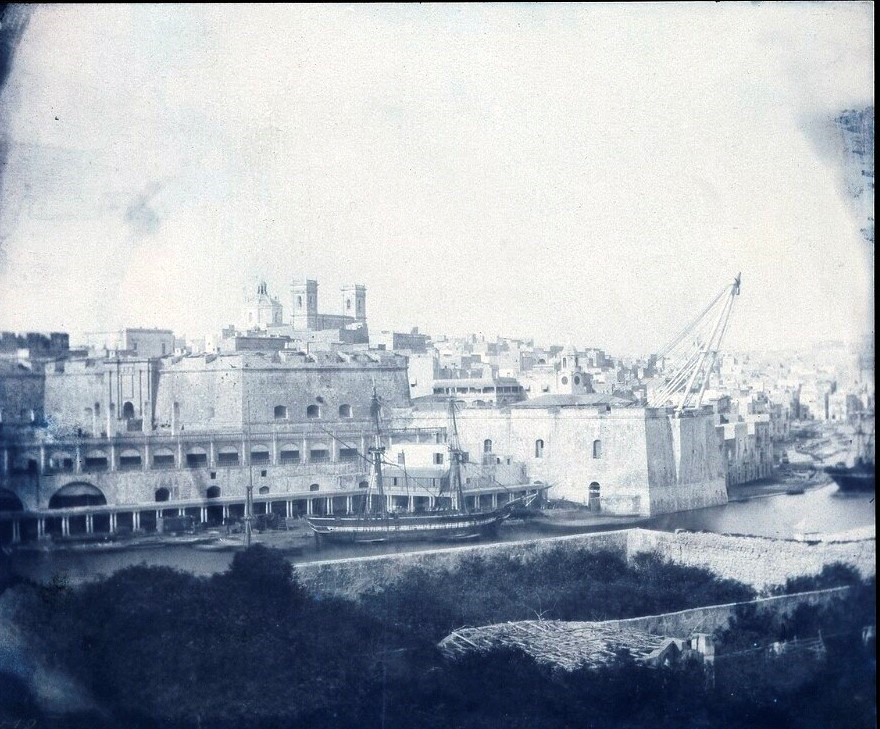
Dockyard at Senglea in 1846, calotype by Calvert Jones

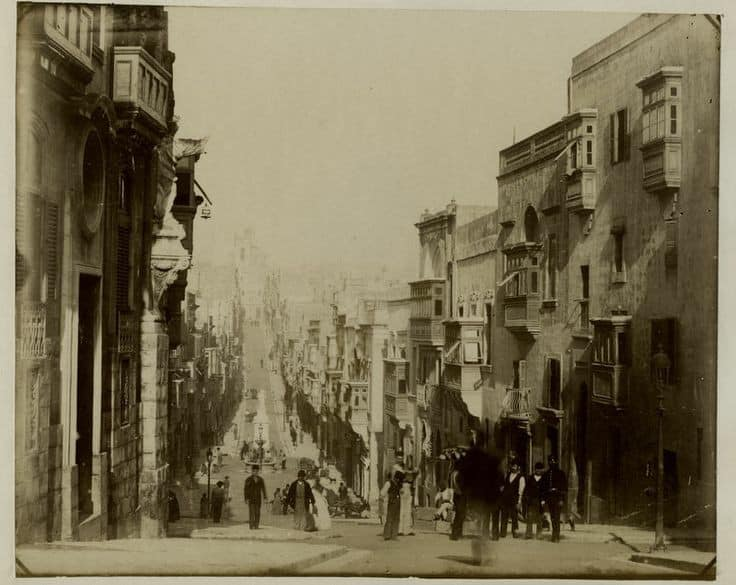
Victory St in Senglea, 1880

During the time of the Knights of St. John, Senglea was also used as a hunting area, and was known as L'Isola di San Giuliano.

In 1311 St. Julian's church or chapel was founded in Isola. This was the first building to be constructed on what later became Senglea. On 8 May 1552 the foundation stone of Fort St. Michael was laid. Work on the fort, which was designed by Architect Pedro Pardo, was completed in 1553. Construction of walled town Senglea took place during the following decade. The area, which had until the 1550s been known as Isola di San Giuliano or Isola di San Michele, was given city status by Grand Master Claude De La Sengle and was named after him.

Senglea played an important role in the Great Siege of Malta in 1565 and remained unconquered. The city was given the title Civitas Invicta (meaning "Unconquered City") by Grand Master Jean Parisot de Valette. In 1581 Senglea became a Parish dedicated to the Nativity of Our Lady. The donation of the statue of Our Lady, popularly known as "Il-Bambina", is estimated to have occurred in 1618. Thousands of inhabitants of the city were killed in a plague epidemic in 1676.

In 1798, Senglea was involved in the blockade against French forces, who were ousted from Malta in 1800. The city narrowly escaped being hit by another plague in 1813; a statue of Our Lady was erected in the city's centre as a sign of gratitude.

The parish church was bestowed with the title of Basilica by Pope Benedict XV in 1921. Senglean-born Ignazio Panzavecchia was elected as the first Prime Minister of Malta in the first Self Government Constitution in the same year. Because of his ecclesiastical status he decided not to take up the position. Following Panzavecchia's refusal Joseph Howard was appointed as Prime Minister.

During the Second World War Senglea suffered heavy bombardments which devastated most of the city and killed many of its citizens. On 16 January 1941 a blitz by the Luftwaffe on HMS Illustrious, docked at the nearby Corradino, caused 21 fatalities and destroyed most of the city's buildings including the Basilica. King George VI visited the devastated city on 20 June 1943.

The newly built Basilica was consecrated by Archbishop Sir Mikiel Gonzi on 24 August 1957. The following day the Basilica resumed its normal functions after almost 16 years and the statue of Marija Bambina was placed inside its new "temple" amongst huge celebrations.

Pope John Paul II visited Senglea in May 1990. To commemorate the 50th anniversary of the Luftwaffe bombing of the city, a monument which honours the local victims of both World Wars was unveiled besides the Basilica on 5 September 1991. The first Local Council of Senglea was formed after an election on 3 March 1994. The first mayor of the city was Stephen Perici.

The Italian city of Cassino became a twin city with Senglea in 2003. In 2010 Senglea won a European Destinations of Excellence award for aquatic tourism.

== Culture ==
Senglea is particularly famous for the statue of Jesus Christ the Redeemer (Ir-Redentur tal-Isla), located in the oratory of the basilica which is dedicated to the birth of the Virgin Mary (Marija Bambina).

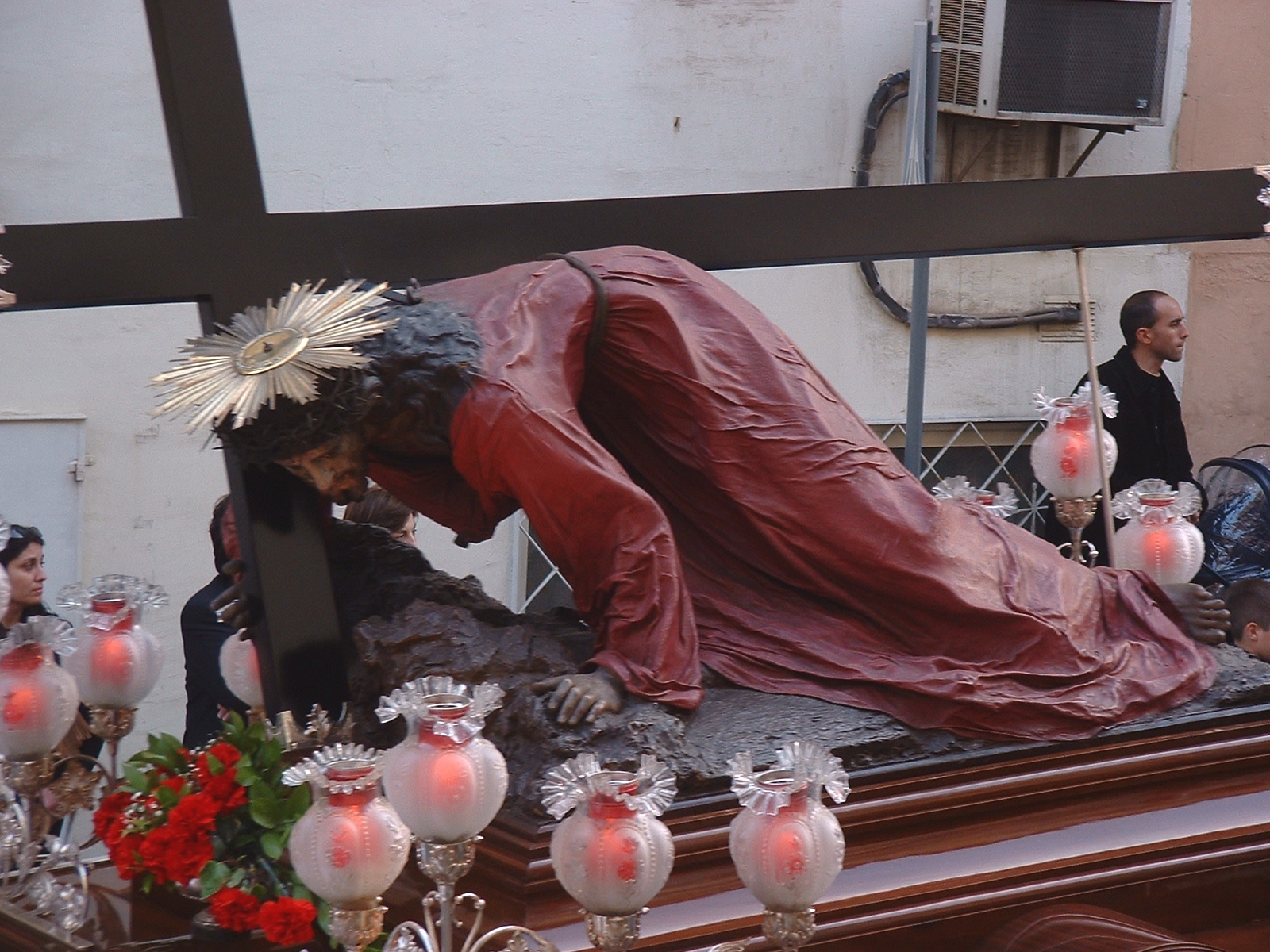
The Redeemer

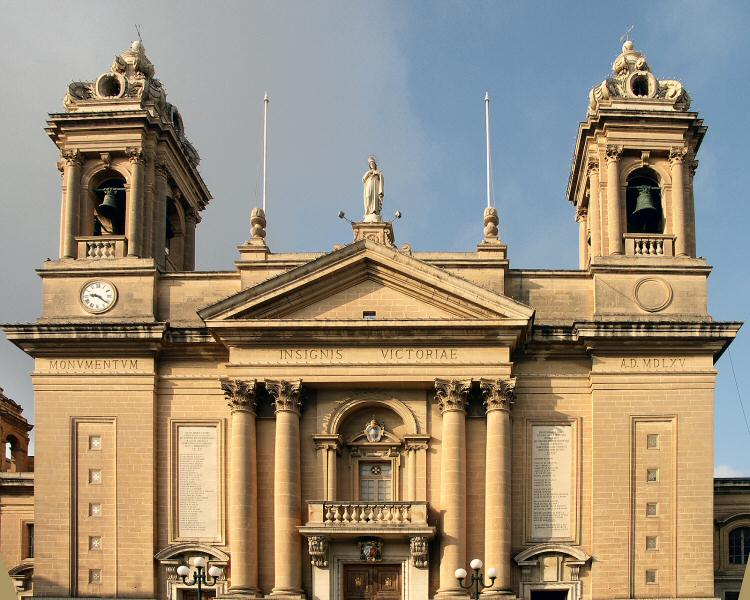
Senglea Basilica

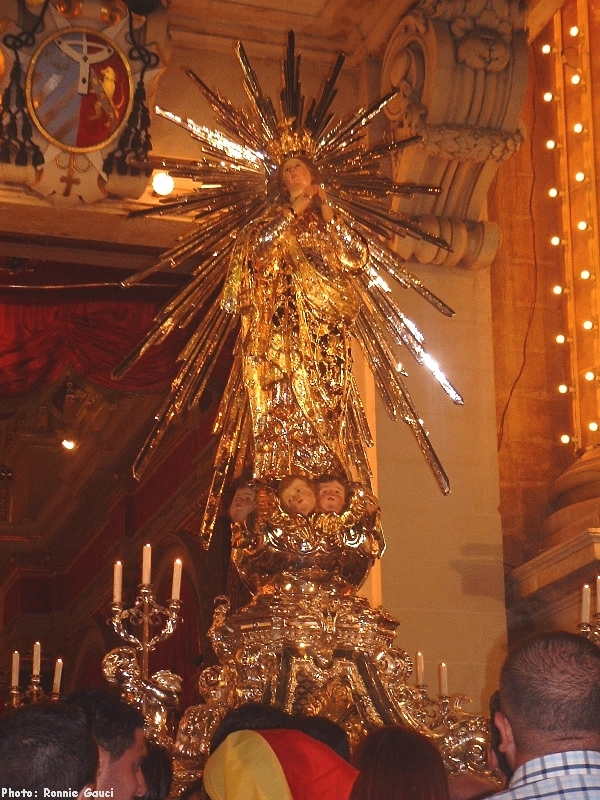
Marija Bambina

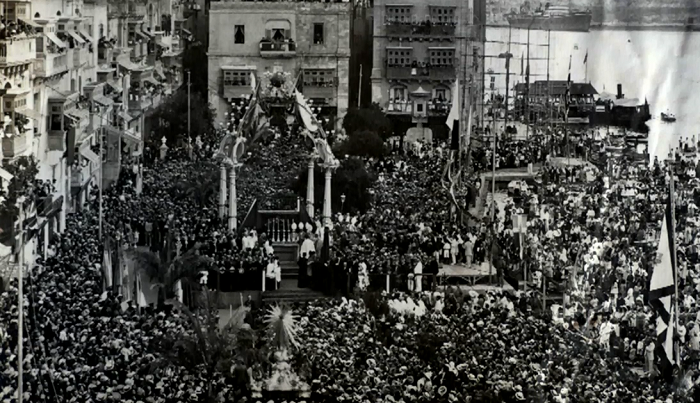
Parish feast in Isla in the 1910s, by Richard Ellis

Senglea also has a statue dedicated to Mary, mother of Jesus, which is often referred to as Il-Madonna tan-Nofs, literally meaning "Our Lady of the Centre". It was originally erected in the city centre during the time of the plague, as gratitude, for being the only town not contaminated.

The local band club is currently named "Socjeta' Filarmonika La Vincitrice". The city's semi-professional football team Senglea Athletic was formed in 1934 to replace the defunct Senglea United side.

== Population ==
The population of Senglea was 2,408 in July 2024. This included 1270 males and 1138 females; 2007 Maltese nationals and 401 foreign nationals.

With an area of just over half a square mile, Senglea is Malta's smallest locality. It is also its most densely populated. Around the start of the 20th century, Senglea had more than 8200 people, making it the most densely populated town in Europe. At the time, Senglea, as well as Cospicua, were the centre of Malta's elite and intelligentsia. The Second World War rapidly altered its social structure as many left to take refuge in outlying towns and countryside, never to return. In recent years, rehabilitation of the Cottonera Waterfront as a yacht marina has spurred a lot of interest from foreign expatriates and businessmen. A March 2011 estimate put its population at 2,964. Its population stood at 2,821 as of March 2013, and this decreased to 2,784 in March 2014.

== Transport ==
Senglea is linked to the capital city of Valletta by a network of bus services. Prior to their introduction in the early 20th century, the cities were connected by boat services. In July 2011, following the introduction of a new bus network by Arriva, boats between the two locations were restarted in response to complaints that bus journeys were too slow.

== Notable people ==
- Francesco Zahra (1710–1773), painter who worked on many churches in Malta
- Juan Bautista Azopardo (1772–1848), founder of the Argentinian Navy in 1810
- Giorgio Mitrovich (1795–1885), politician and activist who successfully campaigned for improved freedoms and rights for Maltese people in the 1830s
- Louis Shickluna (1808–1880), shipbuilder whose shipyards in Canada constructed over 140 ships between 1838 and 1880
- Andrea Debono (1821–1871), explorer of both the River Nile and the Sobat River in Africa
- Ignazio Panzavecchia (1855–1925), priest and politician who declined the position of Prime Minister of Malta in 1921 after his party won a majority
- Mauro Inguanez (1887–1955), priest at the Benedictine Abbey of Cassino, now a twin city of Senglea, and later librarian at the Valletta-based Royal Library
- John F. Marks (1894–1954), man of remarkable political foresight and intellectual initiative who was founder of Dar tal-Haddiema in Senglea. Active member of Labour Party Council instrumental in matters pertaining to the Constitution such as social, educational, industrial and legislative. Prepared the text for Dr. Boffa to propose Bills in Legislative Assembly for Workers Rights and the replacement of Italian with Maltese and English languages in courts and civil service. Leading promoter in the party ensuring that May Day was created in Malta in 1926.
- Gigi Gauci (1911–2003), politician and founder member of the Malta Labour Party
- Charles Clews (1919–2009), actor and comedian
- Anthony Perici (1920–2010), politician, first full-time Mayor of Twinsburg, Ohio
- Charles Thake (1927–2018), actor
- Lina Brockdorff (1930–2026), writer, playwright and radio broadcaster

== Twin towns – sister cities ==
Senglea is twinned with:

- Cassino, Italy
- Zarasai, Lithuania

== Gallery ==
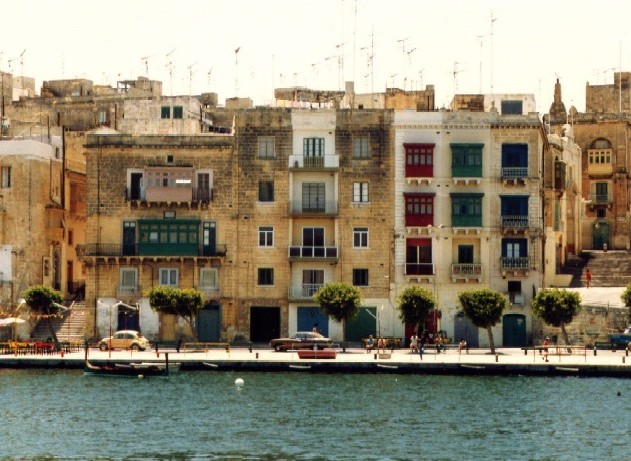
A view of Senglea from the Grand Harbour

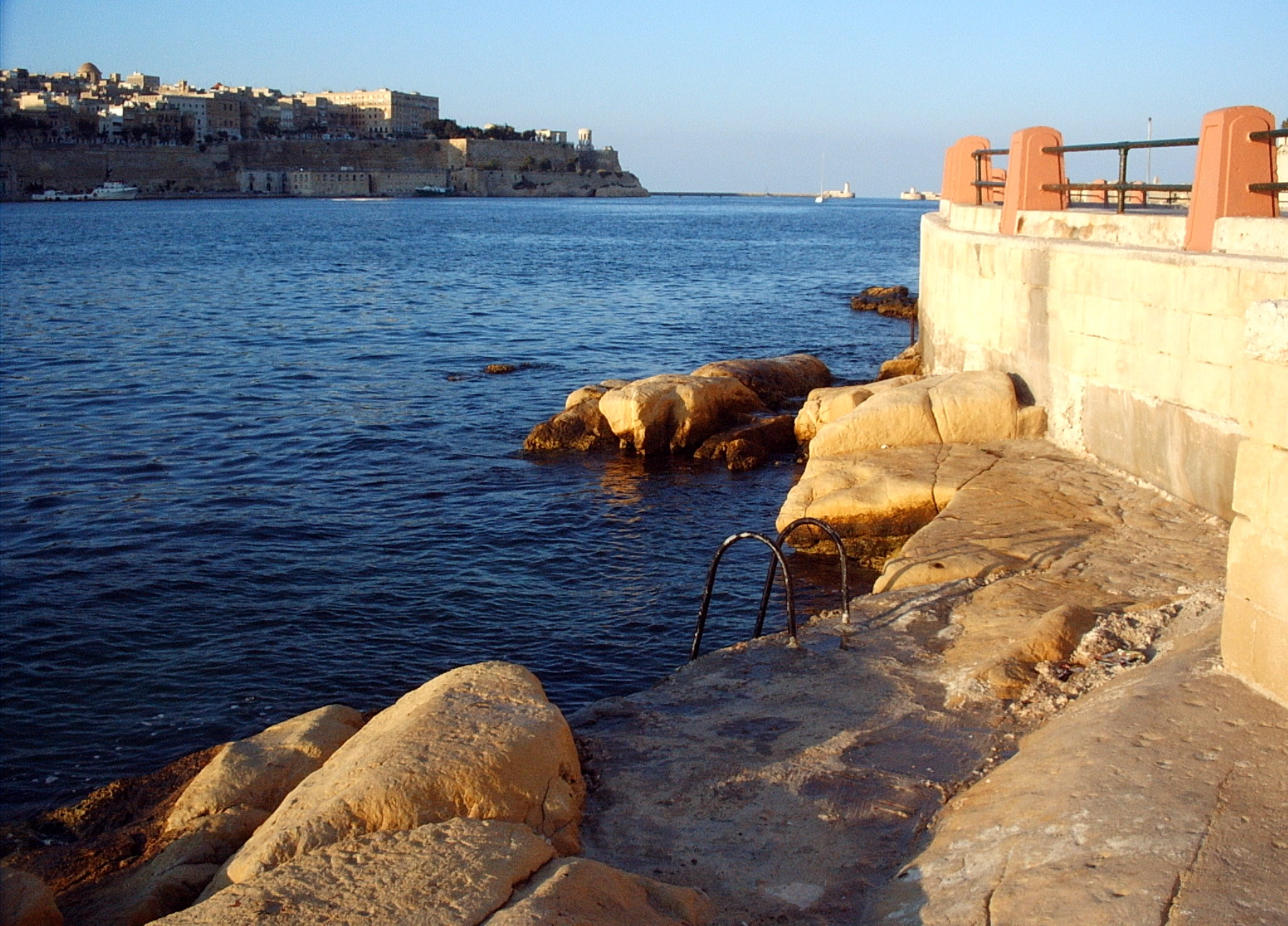
Senglea Point

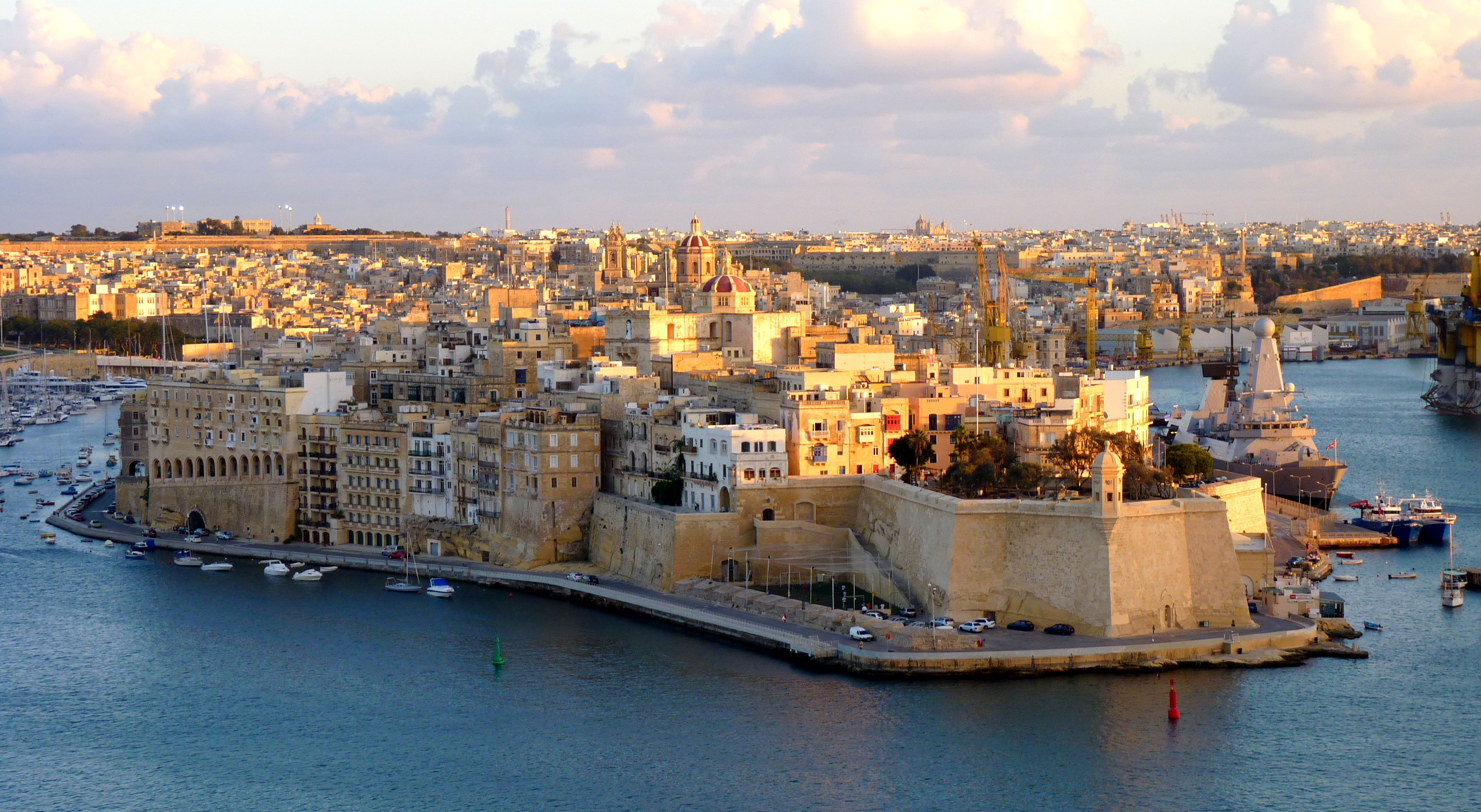
View of Senglea from the Upper Barrakka Gardens

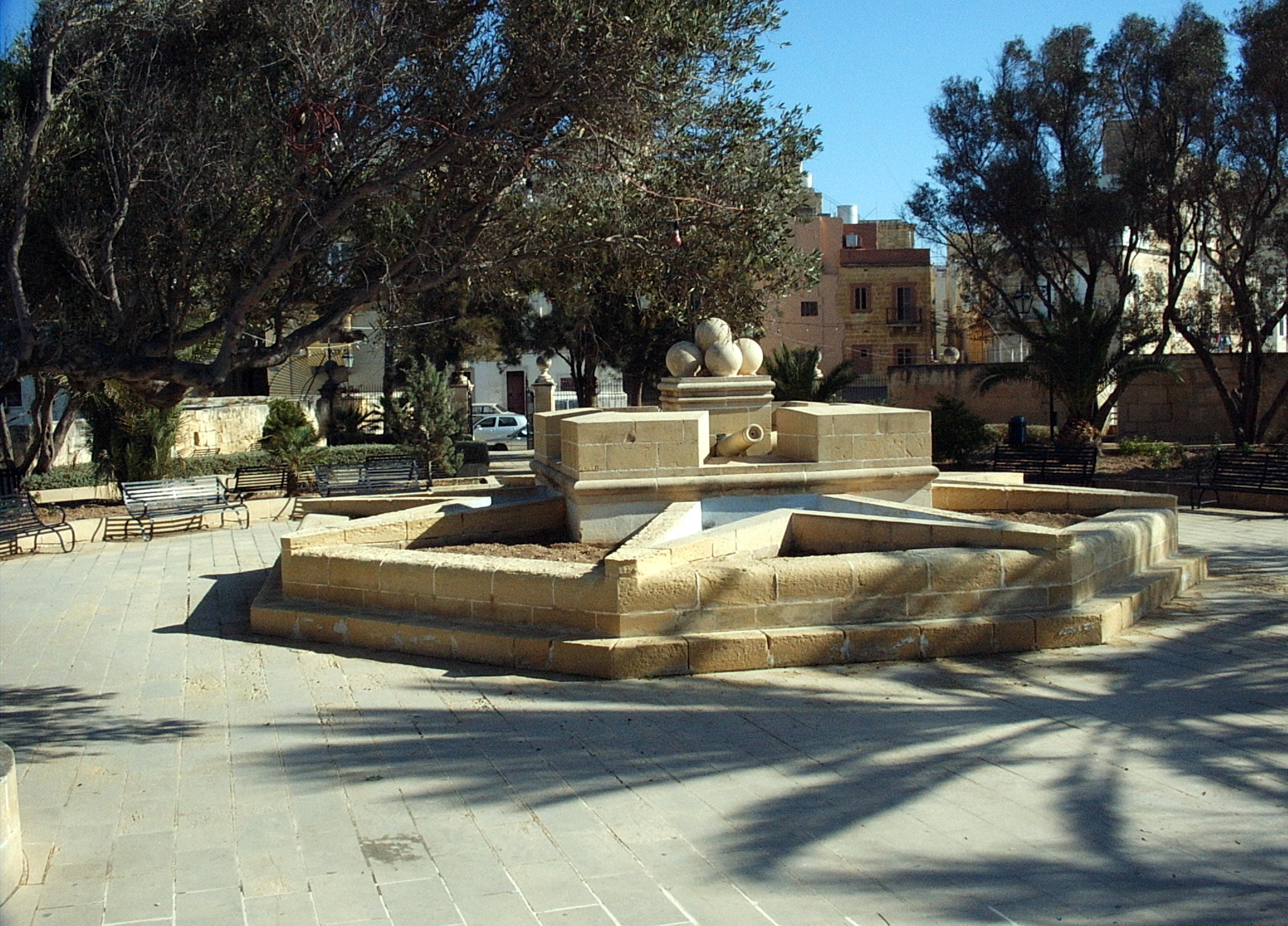
Gardjola Garden

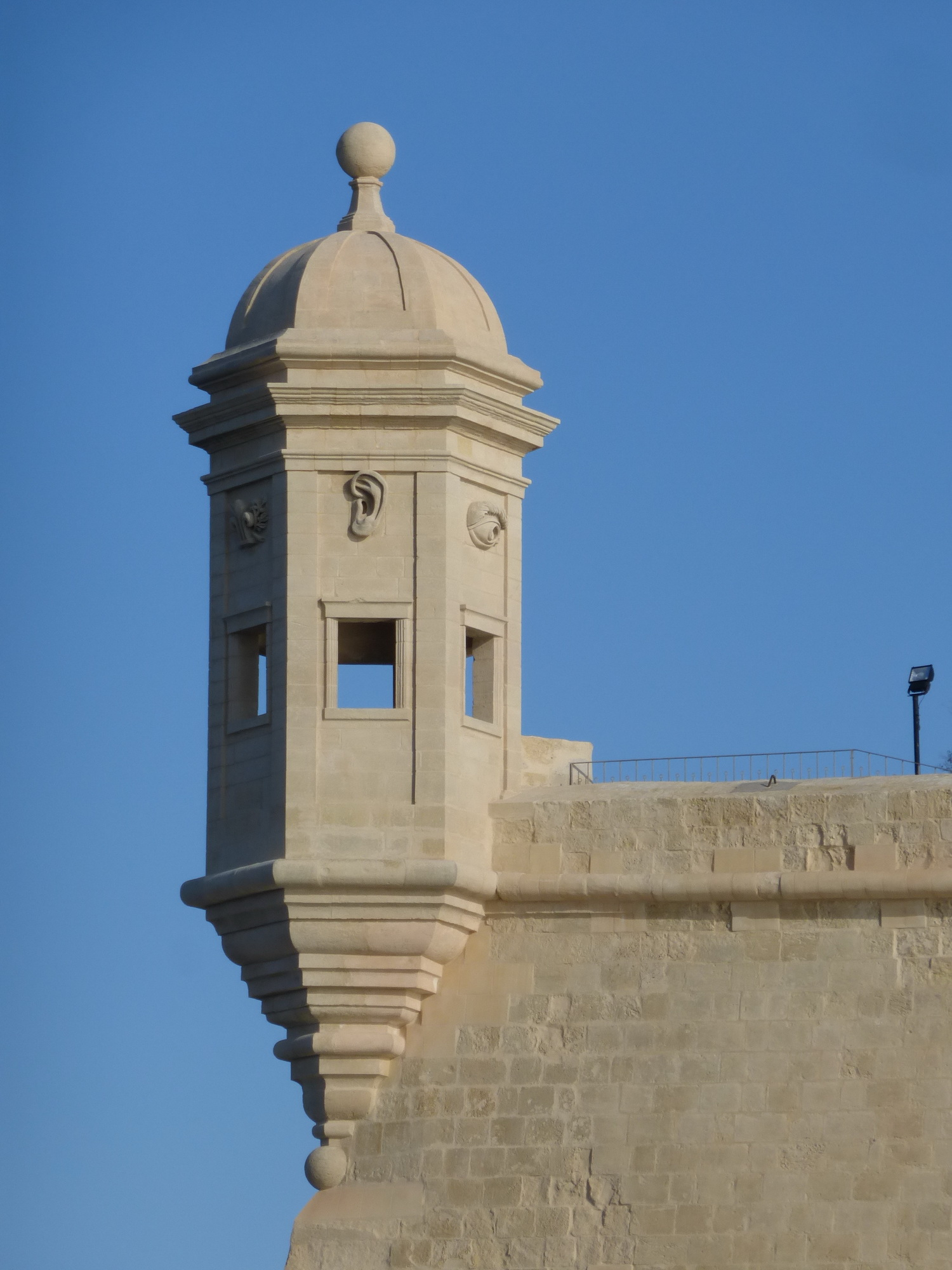
The Gardjola, Senglea

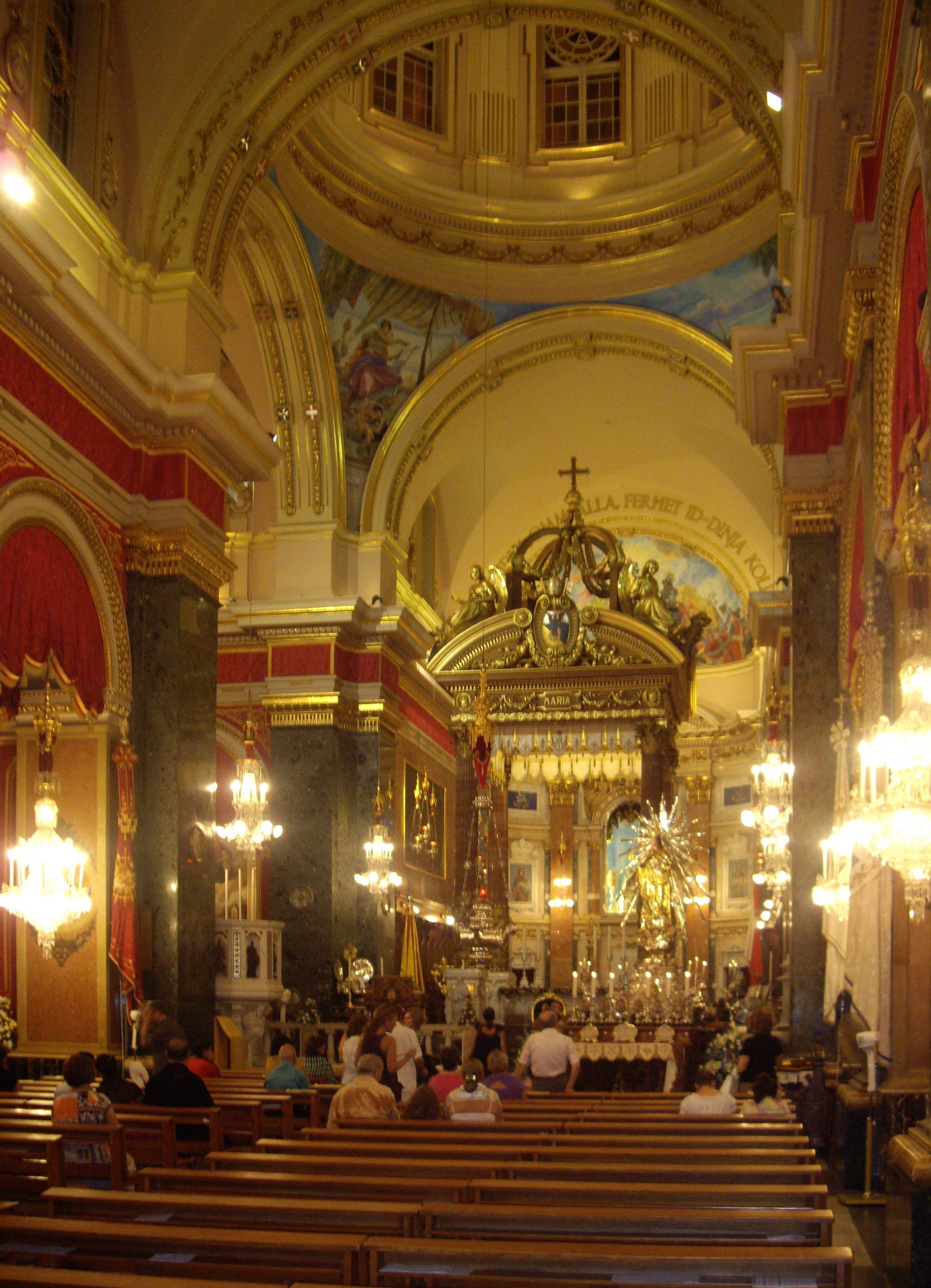
Inside Senglea's Basilica

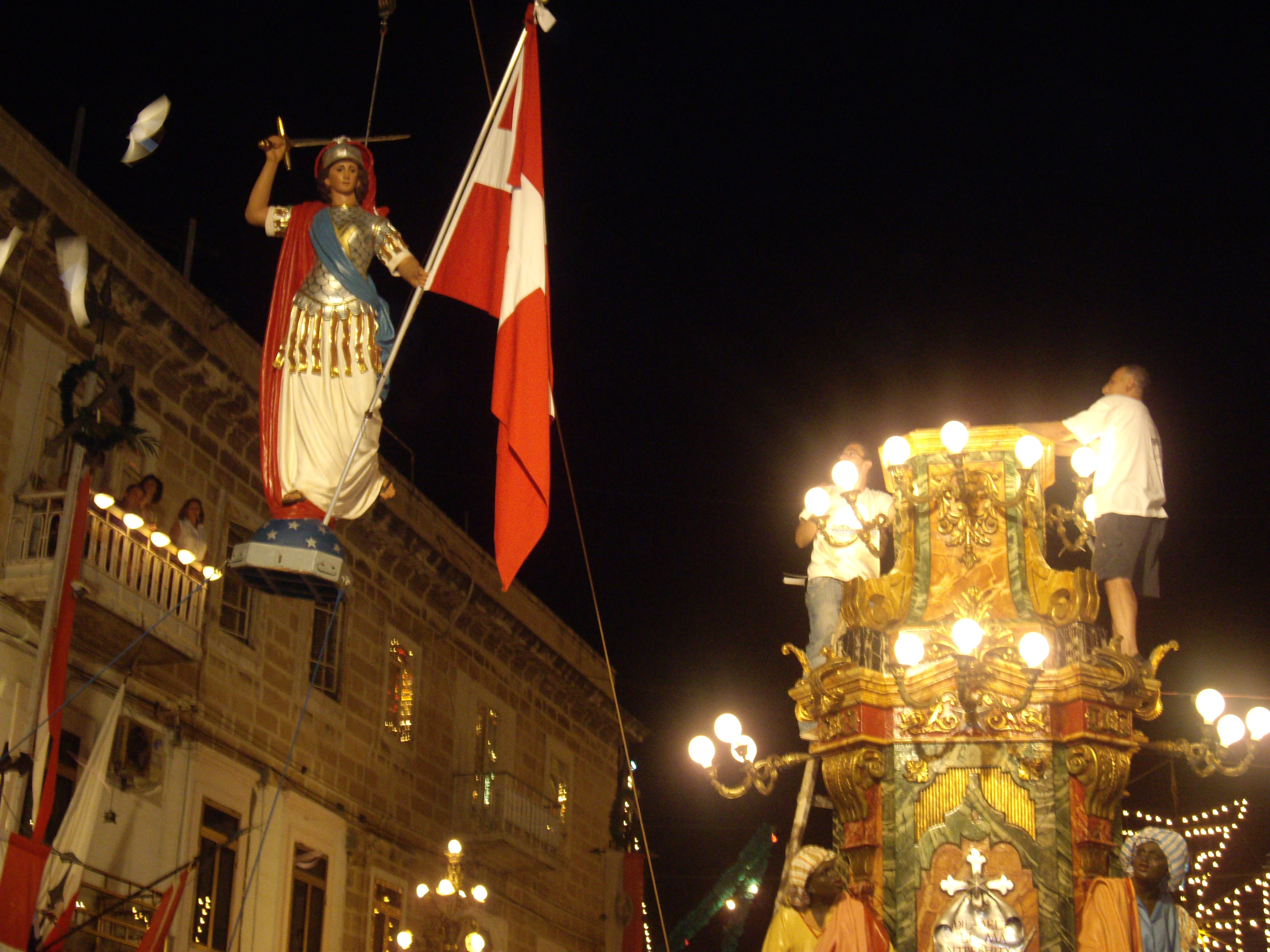
Senglea Feast - Il-Malta

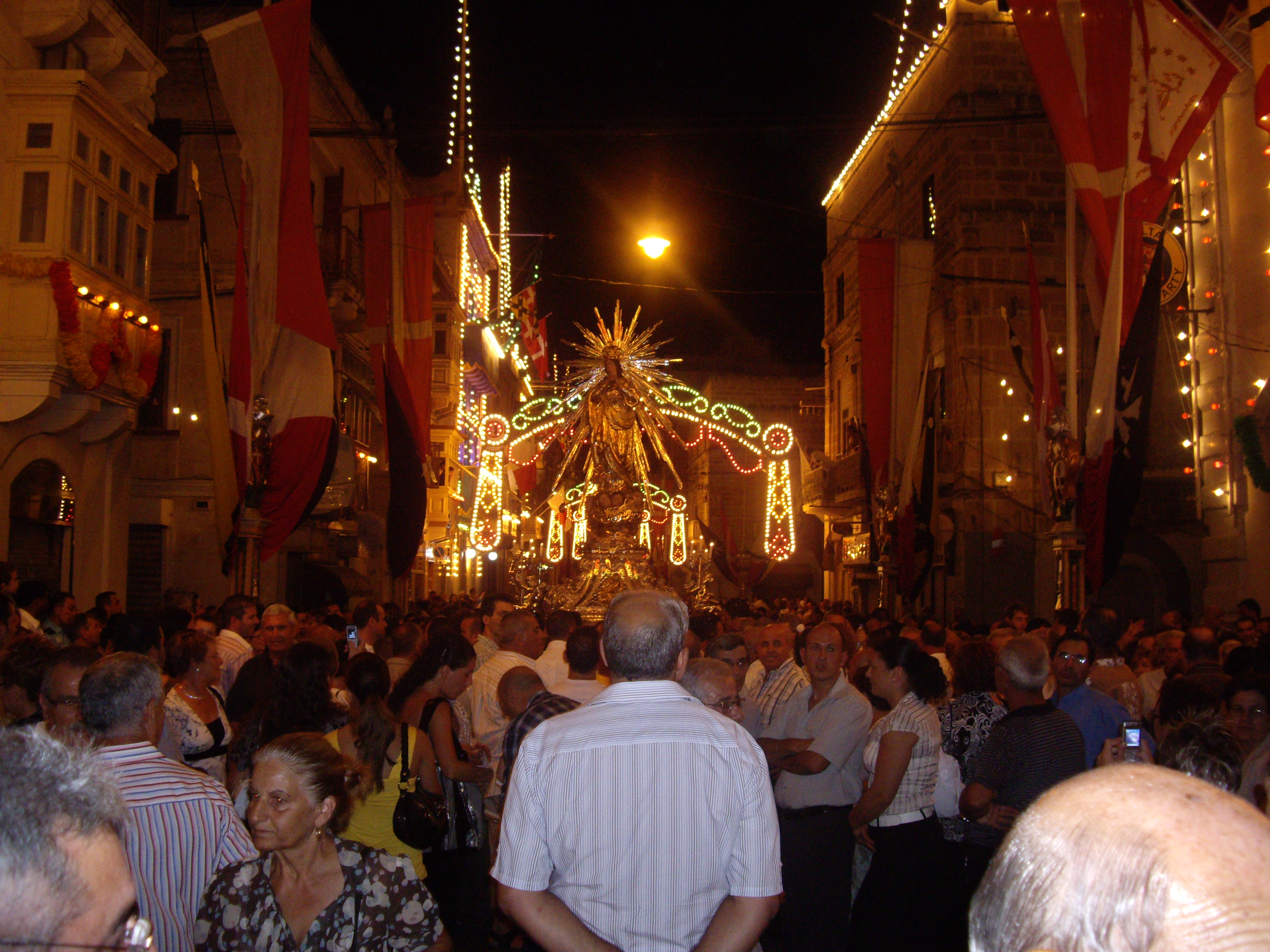
Senglea Feast - Marija Bambina

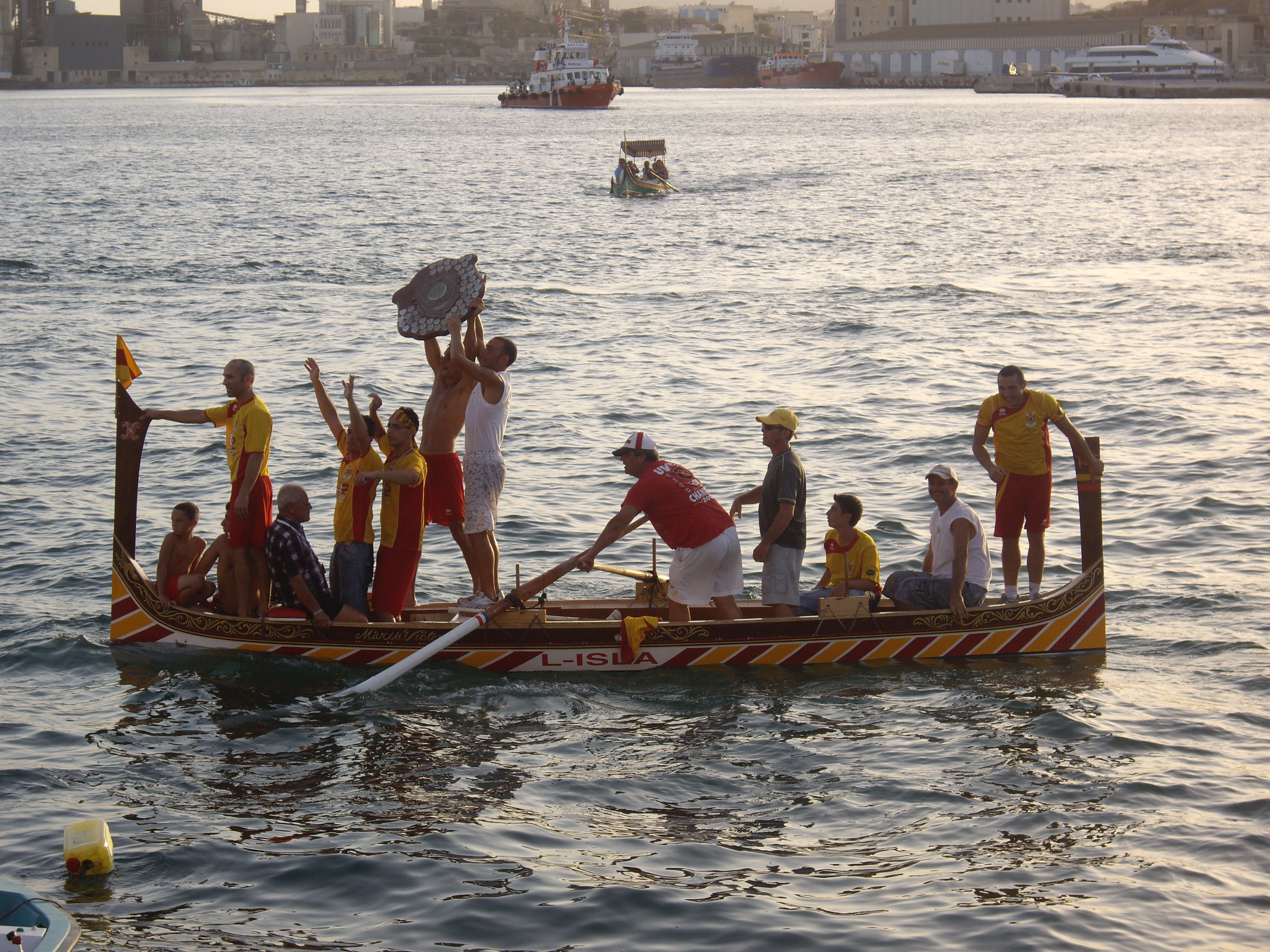
The Regatta, Senglea's most popular sport

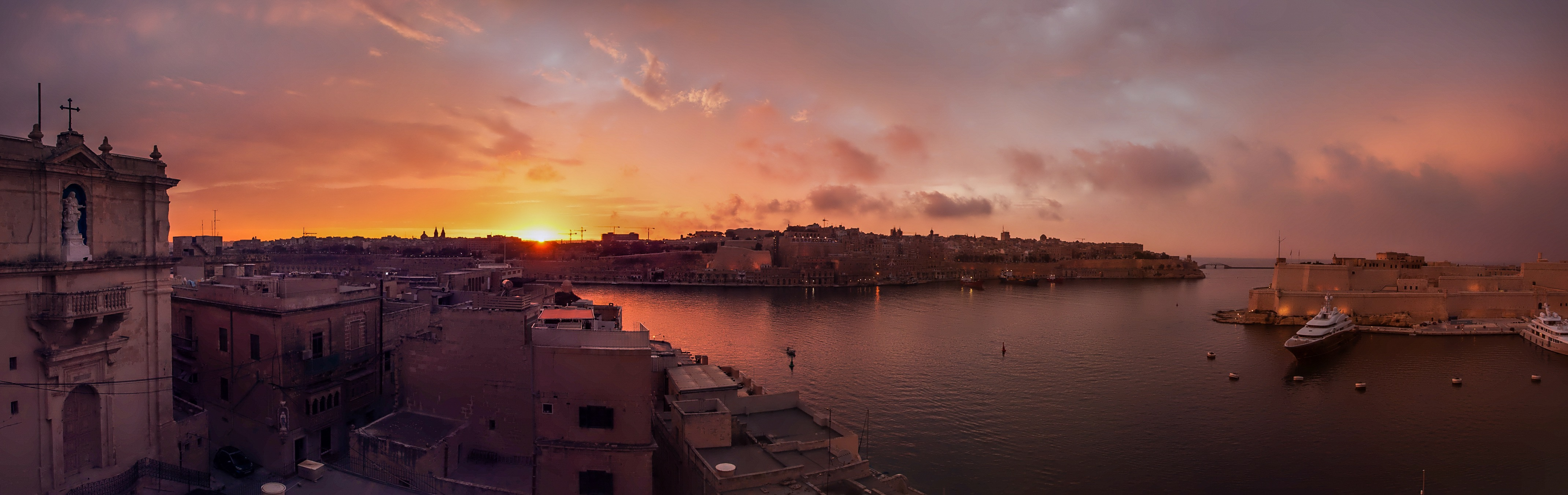
Panoramic view at sunset from Senglea towards Valletta

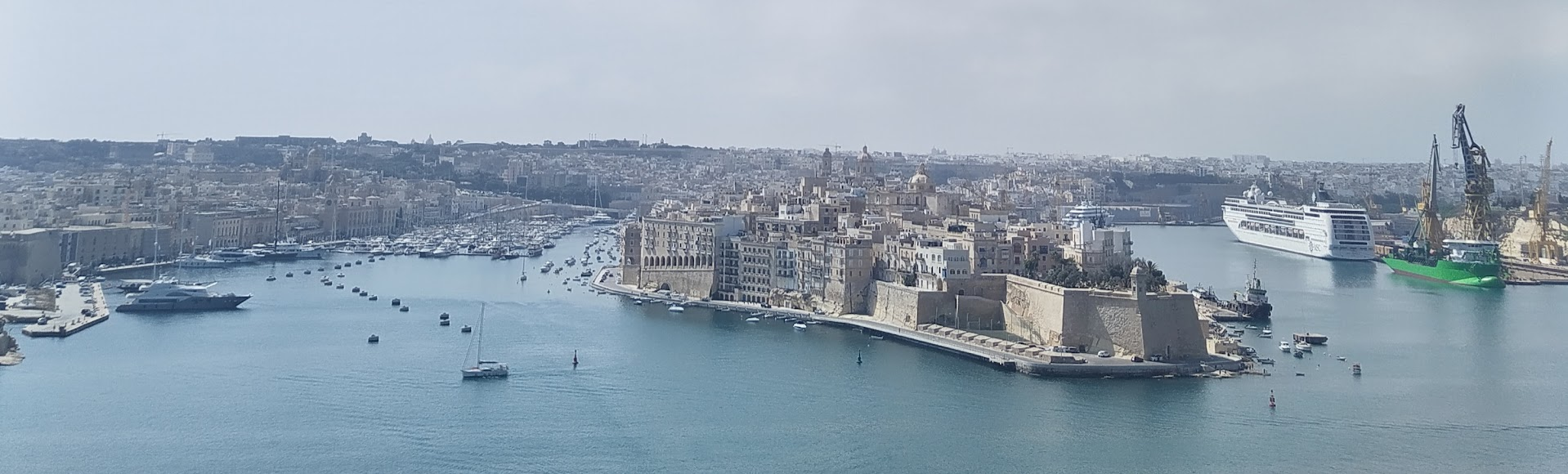
View of Senglea from Valletta
