= Zerafa =

Zerafa is a surname. Notable people with the surname include:

- Alison Zerafa Civelli, Maltese politician
- Benigno Zerafa (1726–1804), Maltese composer
- Francesco Zerafa (1679–1758), Maltese architect
- Jamie Zerafa (born 1998), Maltese football midfielder
- Jesmond Zerafa (born 1965), Maltese professional footballer
- Joseph Zerafa (born 1988), Maltese international footballer
- Michael Zerafa (born 1992), Australian professional boxer
