= St Monica Choir =

Choir

- St Monica Choir Logo & Motto

Background information
- Origin: Mosta, Malta
- Genres: Classical; Contemporary; Sacred
- Years active: 1964–present
- Members: 70–75
- Website: Official website

The St Monica Choir was a Maltese polyphonic choir founded in 1964 by Sr Beniamina Portelli. The choir was known for its polyphonic performances in Malta. The choir's music repertoire deviated from sacred to popular, early to contemporary. In 2018, following the retirement of Portelli, the choir was taken over by two long-serving members, Attard and Vella. This transition marked a new phase, during which the choir was rebranded and renamed as the St Monica Vocal Ensemble in 2019.

== History ==
The choir was founded in 1964 by Sr Beniamina Portelli. For over 20 years, it collaborated with other entities, exchanging visits with foreign choirs and travelling to European countries. The choir presented concerts at the Liverpool Philharmonic Theatre, the Vatican City, St. Stephen's Cathedral in Vienna, Esztergom Cathedral in Hungary and St Mary's Cathedral in Edinburgh, as well as televised and radio recordings for renowned media stations such as the BBC and the ARD. Its collaboration with foreign choirs included the Knox Academy Choir from Scotland and the Beethoven Society of Australia. With the latter, the St Monica Choir presented a production of Beethoven's 9th Symphony with Orkestra Nazzjonali under the baton of Dr Steve Watson at the Teatru Manoel in May 1999. The St Monica Choir was also commissioned to premiere local compositions, such as Stabat Mater by prolific Maltese composer Carmelo Pace together with Orkestra Nazzjonali (the national orchestra) and Mro Michael Laus. Early 2007 saw yet another collaboration come to fruition, this time together with Vocalise, when, for the first time in Malta, Johann Sebastian Bach's Christmas Oratorio Parts I, II & III were performed at St John's Co-Cathedral under the direction of international conductor and musicologist Hans Jürgen Nagel.

In November 1999, the St Monica Choir became the first Maltese choir to win the Malta International Choir Festival. Delegated to represent Malta during the first edition of the choral Olympics held in Linz, Austria in 2000, the choir was awarded bronze from amongst over twenty participants in the mixed choirs’ category.

In 2002, the choir was invited to make a guest appearance during a choral festival at the Dorog House of Culture in Hungary. Two years later, the choir was once again invited to participate in the "XIII Festival de Musica en Navidad" organized by the Cultural Department of Madrid. The St Monica Choir, the only foreign choir invited to participate, held its concert at the Sagrada Familia church in Madrid.

In 2004, to commemorate the 40th Anniversary of its foundation, the choir launched a comprehensive website and a documentary on DVD encompassing forty years of existence and achievements. The choir's Easter and Christmas concerts were used to raise funds for religious missions. In 2006, the St Monica Choir performed a concert in Haddington, Scotland to raise funds for the local church.

The choir was an affiliated member of Förderverein Interkultur, organizers of the Choir Olympics and other Musica Mundi concerts.

In late 2018, the Augustinian sisters ceased their involvement with the choir, which led to its disbandment. Many former members subsequently joined its successor, the St Monica Vocal Ensemble.

== Founder and director ==
From the city of Vittoriosa, Sr Beniamina Portelli, born Marion Portelli, is the eldest of five daughters and a son born to Carmelo and Ines née Calleja. The Portelli family took refuge in Siggiewi during the Second World War.

Portelli joined the Augustinian nuns at the age of sixteen. She began piano lessons at the age of five, studied with Sr Teresina Saliba, and completed her finals and LRSM under the guidance of Ms Bascetta.

Portelli attended various courses both in Malta and abroad. Her notable trips were to the Vatican City for choral singing (1953); Derbyshire for professional music teaching (1964); Harrogate for choral direction (1983); the London Royal Schools of Music with Mr A Kelly (1985); Edinburgh and London with EPTA (1993). She received a Licentiate of the London College of Music (LLCM) for choral direction and was awarded the Society of Music Medal as the first successful candidate worldwide.

In the early 1950s, Portelli spent a year teaching music in Rome. Upon returning to Malta, she continued teaching music and organized end-of-year concerts for her students that included dancing and choral singing. She also set up an accordion band.

In September 2000, the Mosta Local Council bestowed upon Portelli "Gieh il-Mosta". In November 2000, she was awarded the Society Music Medal by the Council of Arts, Manufacture and Commerce. On 13 December 2003, at the Grandmaster's Palace in Valletta, the President of the Republic, Guido de Marco, awarded Portelli the Midalja għall-Qadi tar-Repubblika for her efforts in promoting music and establishing the St Monica Choir.

Portelli taught students including composer Ray Agius, pianists Mark Darnford and Stefan Cassar (who also teaches music in France), John Attard (who teaches music in Austria) and Fr Aurelio Mule’ Stagno. Others included Claire Massa, Simone Attard and Maureen Galea, graduates of the University of Malta.

On 15 December 2023, Sr Beniamina Portelli died. Her funeral was held on 18 December 2023, at the Church of the Augustinian Fathers in Hal Tarxien.

As of April 2024, the St Monica Vocal Ensemble is led by Jean Paul Attard, the current choir director, and Roanna Vella, who performs a dual role as assistant director and choir pianist.

== Administration ==
The administrative committee was elected by the choristers for a two-year term and chaired by Portelli.

Voice-leaders sub-committee were headed by a coordinator acting in liaison with the committee. Leaders from each voice-section were selected by Portelli in consultation with the coordinator and the committee president.

== Awards and achievements ==
=== The 11th Malta International Choir Festival ===
St Monica Choir participated in the 11th Malta International Choir Festival in November 1999. The final night was held on 12, November 1999, at the Mediterranean Conference Centre. Other participating choirs included the Lakatamia Municipal Choir from Cyprus, the Děčínský pěvecký sbor from the Czech Republic and the St. Stythians Male Voice Choir, Cornwall, UK.

The repertoire included 'Magnus Dominus' by Benigno Zerafa and the test piece, 'Quam Dilecta Tabernacula Tua Domine' by Carlo Diacono (1876–1942). The choir's performance also included 'Rhythm of Life' from Sweet Charity, 'The Bare Necessities' from the motion picture The Jungle Book and the spirituals 'Hush, somebody’s Calling My Name and I Want Jesus.' The adjudicating panel awarded St Monica Choir the first prize and gold trophy, the first time ever that a Maltese choir had won the Malta International Choir Festival.

=== 2000 Choir Olympics ===
In Linz, Austria, the choir attended the official opening ceremony of the 1st Edition of the Choir Olympics at the multifunctional Design Center. During the Friendship Concert and the qualifying competition the choristers met with participants from Austria, Greece and Japan. The choir won the bronze award in the mixed choir category.

== Recordings ==
In September 2001, the choir released its first recording, titled Expressions. It was released in CD format for local distribution.
