= Birgu =

Birgu Il-Birgu Città Vittoriosa
- City and Local council
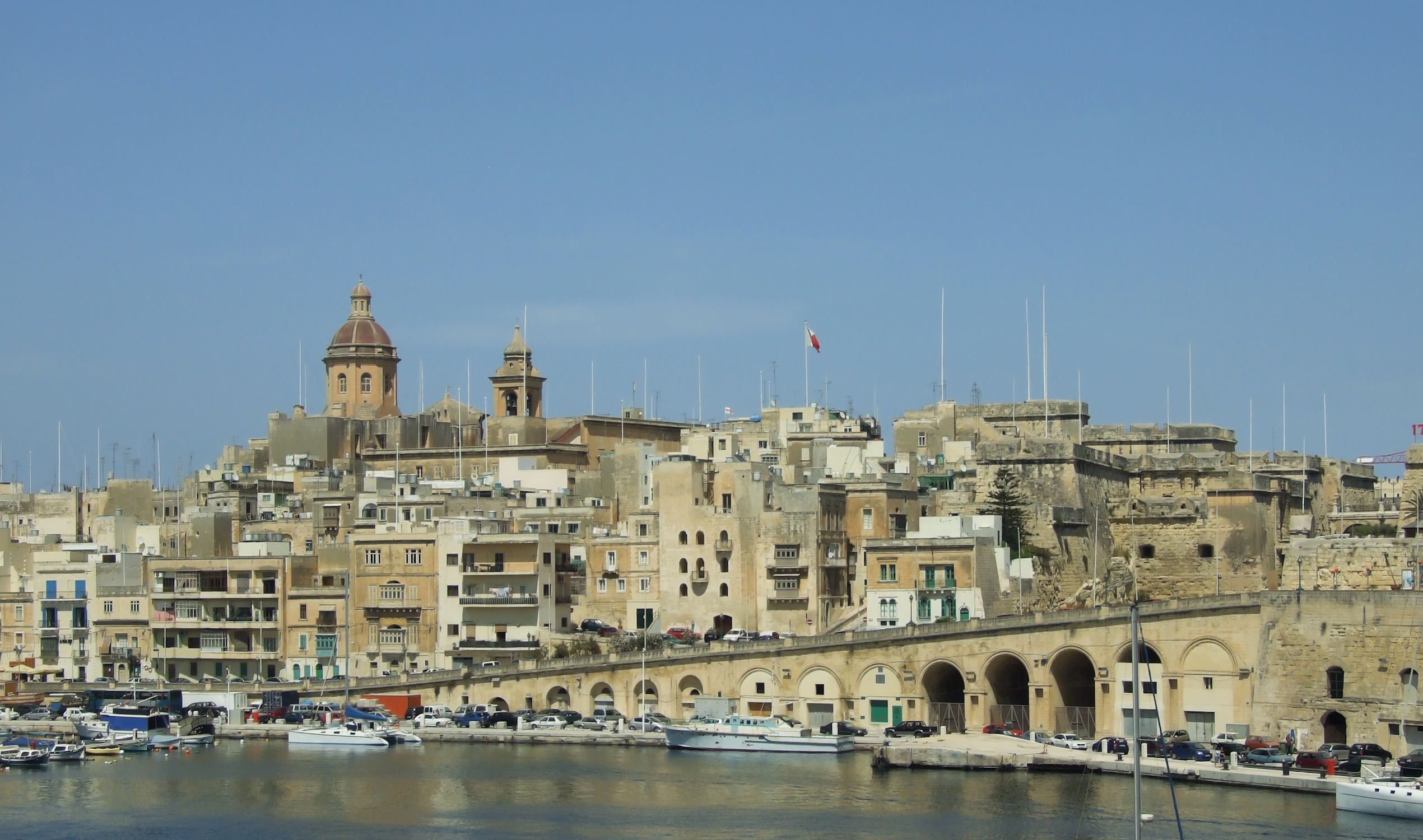
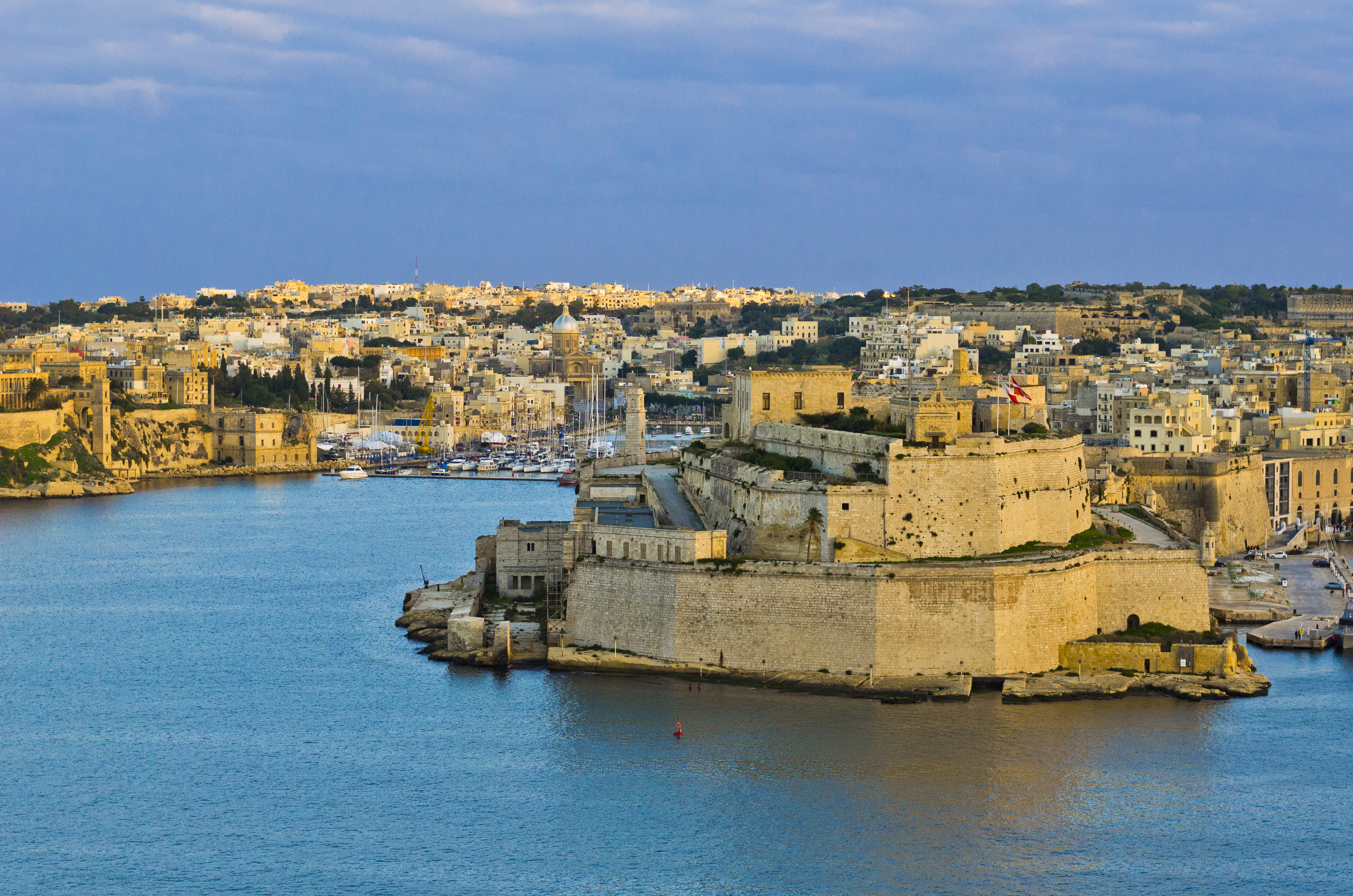
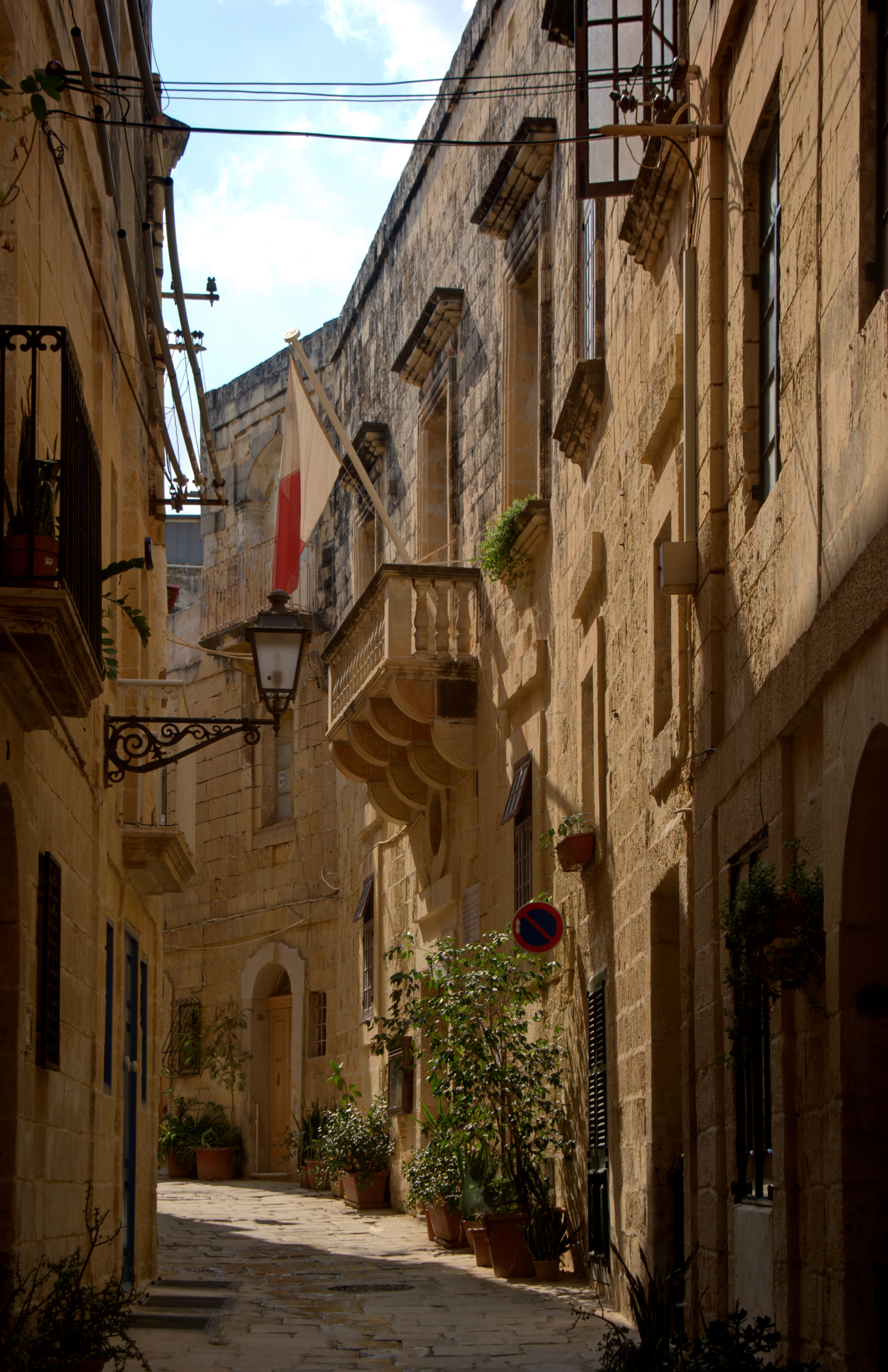
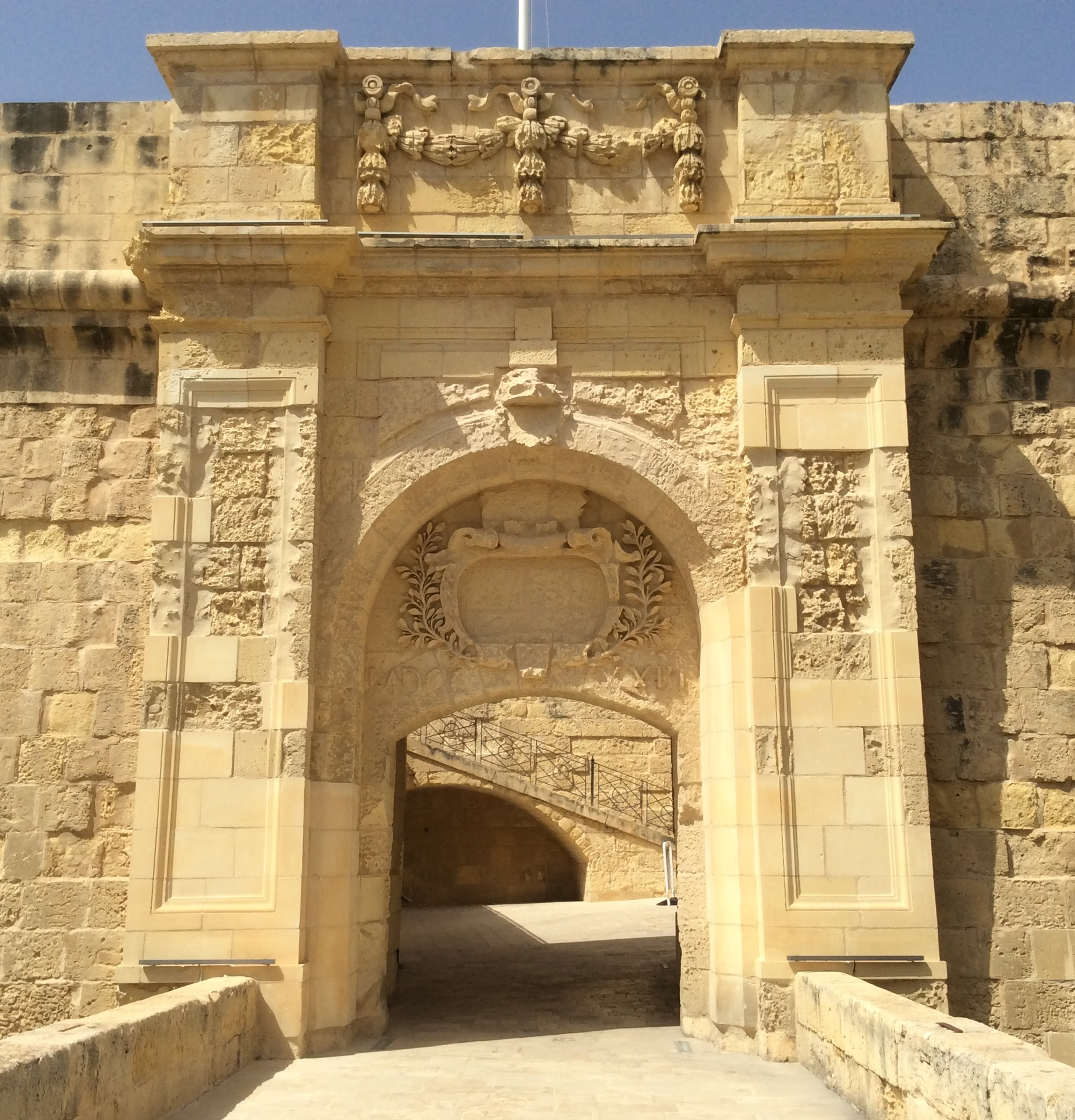
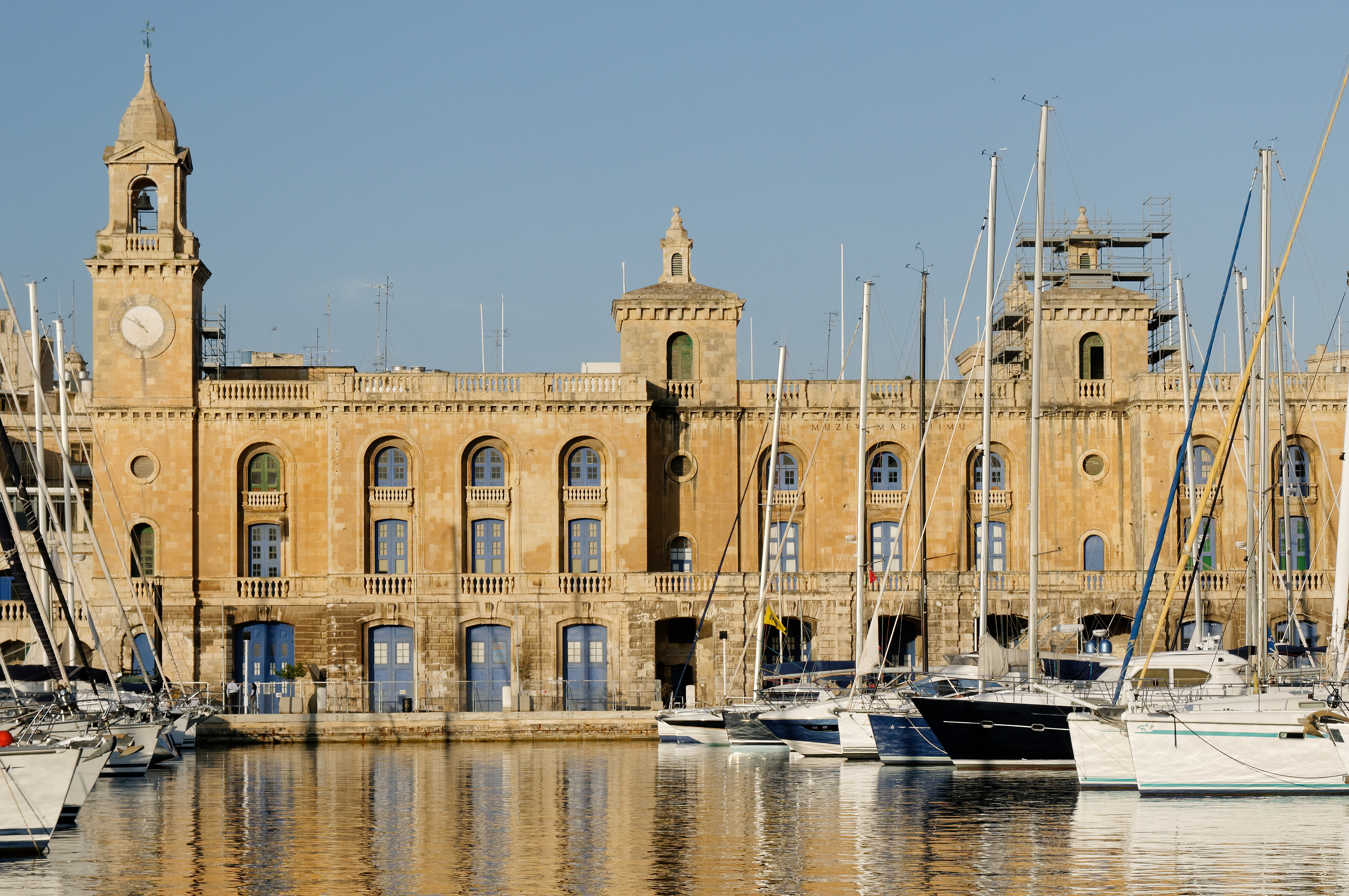
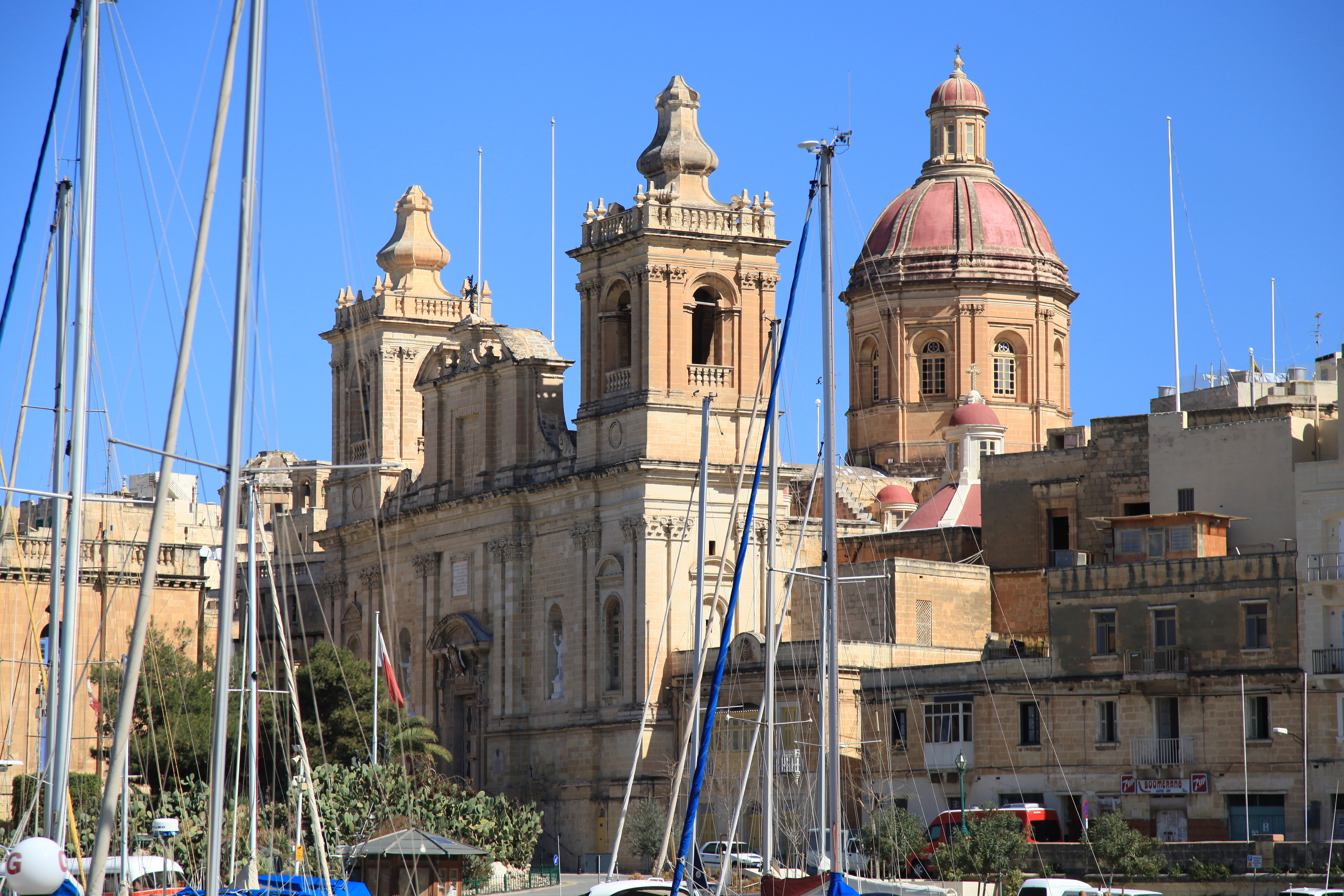
- From top: skyline, Fort Saint Angelo, Auberge d'Angleterre, Advanced Gate, Malta Maritime Museum, Church of St. Lawrence

- Flag Coat of arms

- Location within Malta Location within Mediterranean
- Coordinates: 35°53′17″N 14°31′21″E
- Country: Malta
- Region: Port Region
- District: Southern Harbour District
- Borders: Cospicua, Kalkara, Żabbar

Government
  - Mayor: John Boxall (PL)

Area
  - Total: 0.5 km^{2} (0.19 sq mi)

Population (Jul. 2024)
  - Total: 2,289
  - Density: 4,600/km^{2} (12,000/sq mi)
- Demonym(s): Ġirbi (m), Ġirbija (f), Ġirbin (pl)
- Time zone: UTC+1 (CET)
  - Summer (DST): UTC+2 (CEST)
- Postal code: BRG
- Dialing code: 356
- ISO 3166 code: MT-03
- Patron saint: St. Lawrence
- Day of festa: 10 August
- Website: Official website

Birgu (Maltese: Il-Birgu [ɪlˈbɪrɡʊ], Italian: Vittoriosa), also known by its title Città Vittoriosa ('Victorious City'), is an old fortified city on the south side of the Grand Harbour in the Port Region of Malta. The city occupies a promontory of land with Fort Saint Angelo at its head and the city of Cospicua at its base. Birgu is ideally situated for safe anchorage, and has a long history of maritime, mercantile and military activities.

Birgu was settled in medieval times. Prior to the establishment of Valletta as capital and main city of Malta, military powers that wanted to rule the Maltese islands would need to take Birgu in order to control the Grand Harbour. The city served as the base of the Order of Saint John and de facto capital city of Malta from 1530 to 1571. Birgu is well known for its vital role in the Great Siege of Malta of 1565.

In the early 20th century, Birgu had a population of over 6000. Over the years this decreased, and stood at 2,629 in March 2014. The local population speaks the Cottonera dialect, which is, however, most limited in Birgu.

== History ==
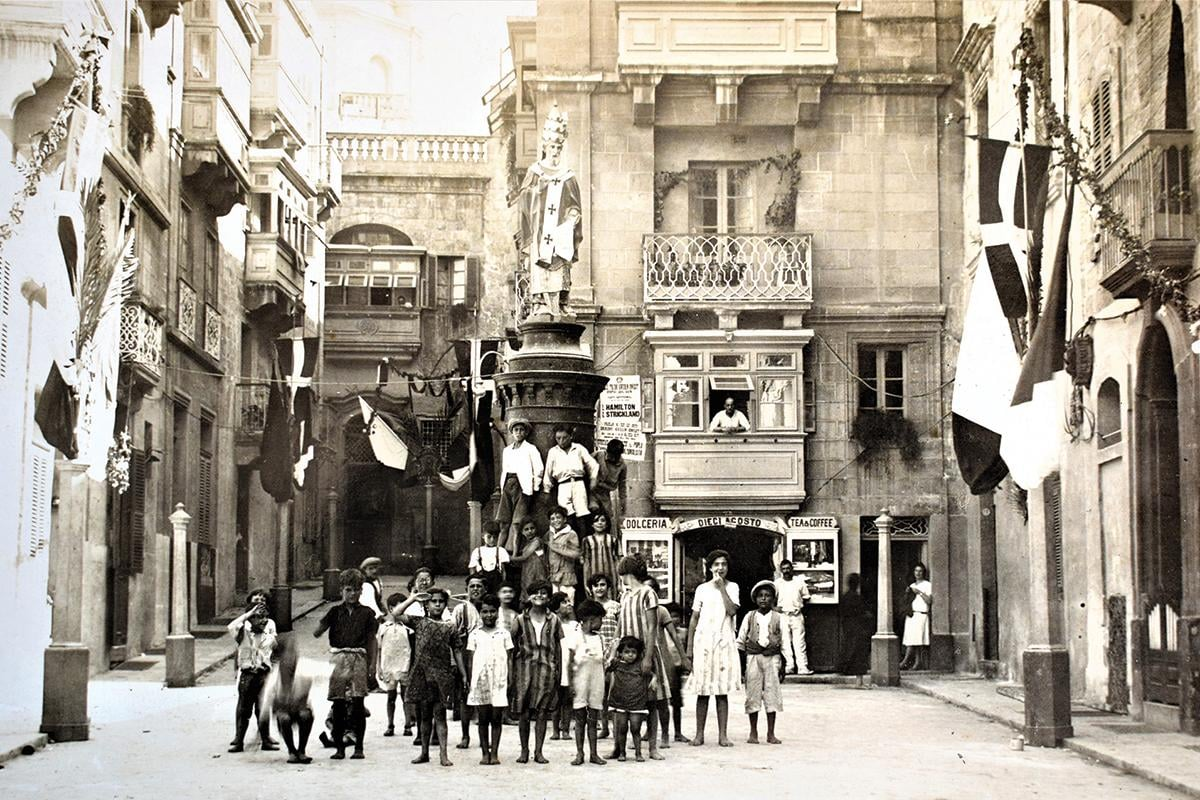
Feast of St Lawrence, 10 August 1927

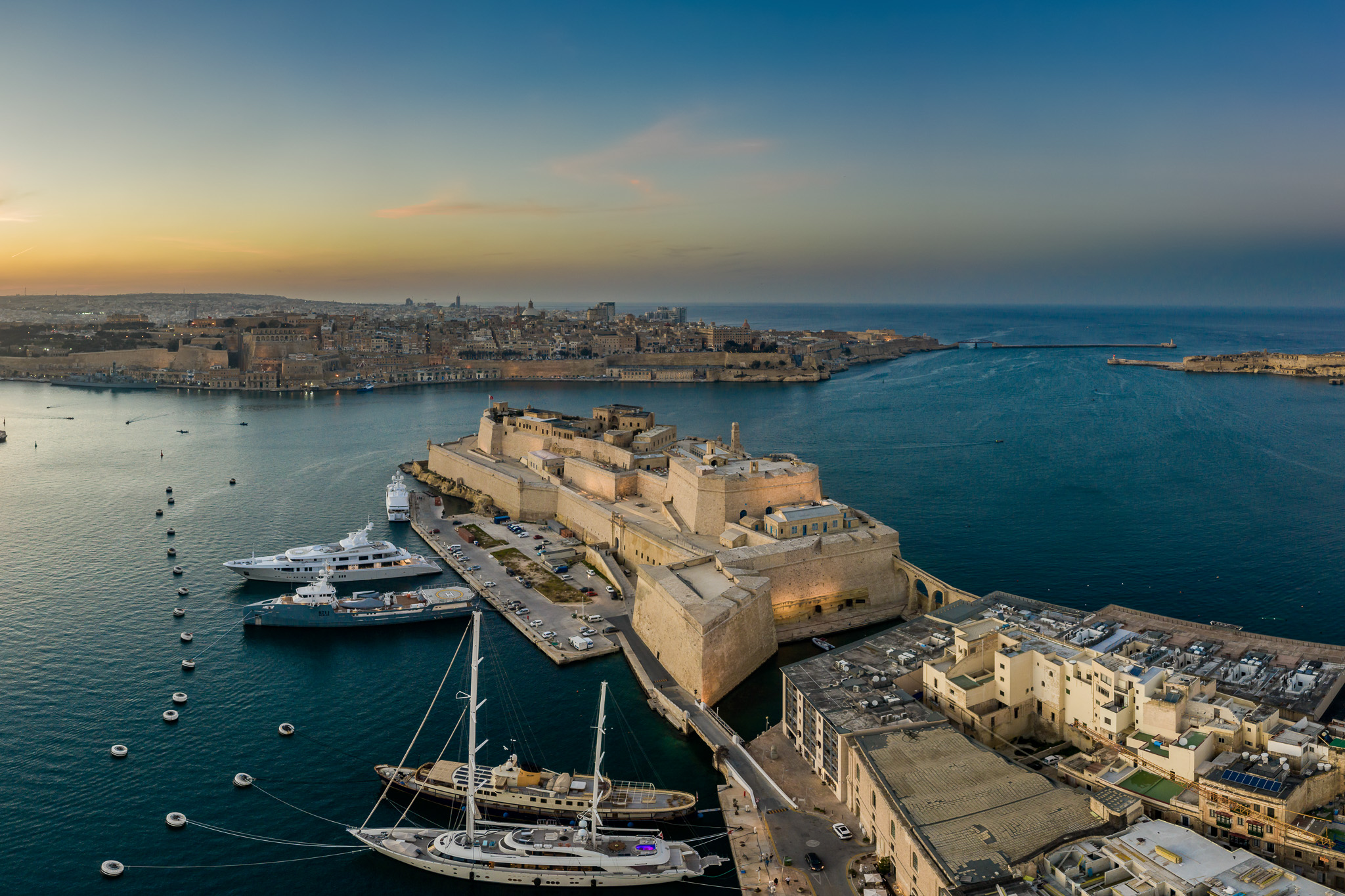
Fort Saint Angelo

Phoenicians, Greeks, Romans, Byzantines, Arabs, Normans, the Angevines, the Aragonese and the Order of Saint John all contributed to the development of Birgu.

Birgu was part of a town named Birmula. When the order of St John came to Malta they planned to build 3 cities from this land. It started from Senglea, then Vittoriosa and Cospicua. The rest of the land was named Cottonera and it was surrounded with the Cottonera lines.

In the Middle Ages, the islands' communal organisation in this period pitted the Mdina town-council, or Universitas, against the independent entity centred around the Castrum Maris. Many inhabitants of Birgu, and the neighbouring villages argued that they were not liable to pay taxes to the Mdina town-council, as they fell within Castrum Maris jurisdiction. For example, this was the case with the inhabitants of Żejtun, who refused to pay the taxes due to the Mdina council in 1473, even if as late as 1494 they were expected to take refuge in Mdina, rather than Birgu.

After being driven out of Rhodes by the Ottoman Empire, the Order of Saint John were granted Malta as their new home. In 1526, the Order sent a commission made up of eight knights to Malta, representing each of the langues. They described Birgu as a small defenceless town with old houses in poor condition. When they arrived in 1530, they decided to make Birgu the capital city of Malta, since the former capital, Mdina, was inland and did not suit their naval requirements.

The city was fortified in the 1530s and strengthened in the 1550s in preparation for an attack by the Ottoman Empire. This included the construction of the Castle of St Angelo, a large fortification separated from the city by a narrow channel, instead of the ancient Castrum Maris. The castle was connected to the city by means of a drawbridge.

Birgu was the site of major battles between the Knights and the Ottoman Empire during the Great Siege of Malta in 1565. After four months of successful defence by the Knights, the city was almost captured by the Ottoman army in August, but was recaptured by the Knights under Grand Master Jean Parisot de Valette. Reinforcements from Sicily arrived a month later, and the siege was abandoned by the Ottomans. After this, a new capital city was built on Mount Sceberras, bearing the name Valletta. In 1571, the Knights transferred their convent and seat to the new capital and Birgu lost some of its importance. Despite this, after the siege, Birgu was given the title Città Vittoriosa, Italian for "victorious city".

After the taking of Malta by Napoleon in 1798, French forces were garrisoned in the city. Soon after the Maltese rebelled and the Grand Harbour area was blockaded by Maltese rebels aided by Britain, Portugal and Naples. The French eventually capitulated in September 1800, and Malta became a British protectorate. The Royal Navy's Mediterranean Fleet established its base in Birgu, and British forces remained stationed in Birgu until 1979.

In 1806, Birgu's gunpowder magazine exploded, killing over 200 people.

Birgu was heavily bombed during World War II due to its proximity to the Malta Dockyard. A number of historic buildings were destroyed, including the Birgu Clock Tower and the Auberge d'Allemagne.

In recent years, due to an agreement made by the Maltese Government with Sovereign Military Order of Malta, this Catholic Order of Knighthood has returned to the Island. This agreement, which has a duration of 99 years, grants the Knights of Malta the exclusive use of Fort St. Angelo in Birgu.

== Attractions ==
Birgu is the location of several tourist attractions. The historic Vittoriosa Waterfront contains the former Palace of the General of the Galleys and the Order of St John's treasury. The area was refurbished in the early 2000s, and both buildings are used for other activities: the former is now a casino, while the latter is home to the Malta Maritime Museum. A second museum, the Vittoriosa 1565 Museum, is also located in the town and is dedicated to the siege and the battle in the town in 1565.

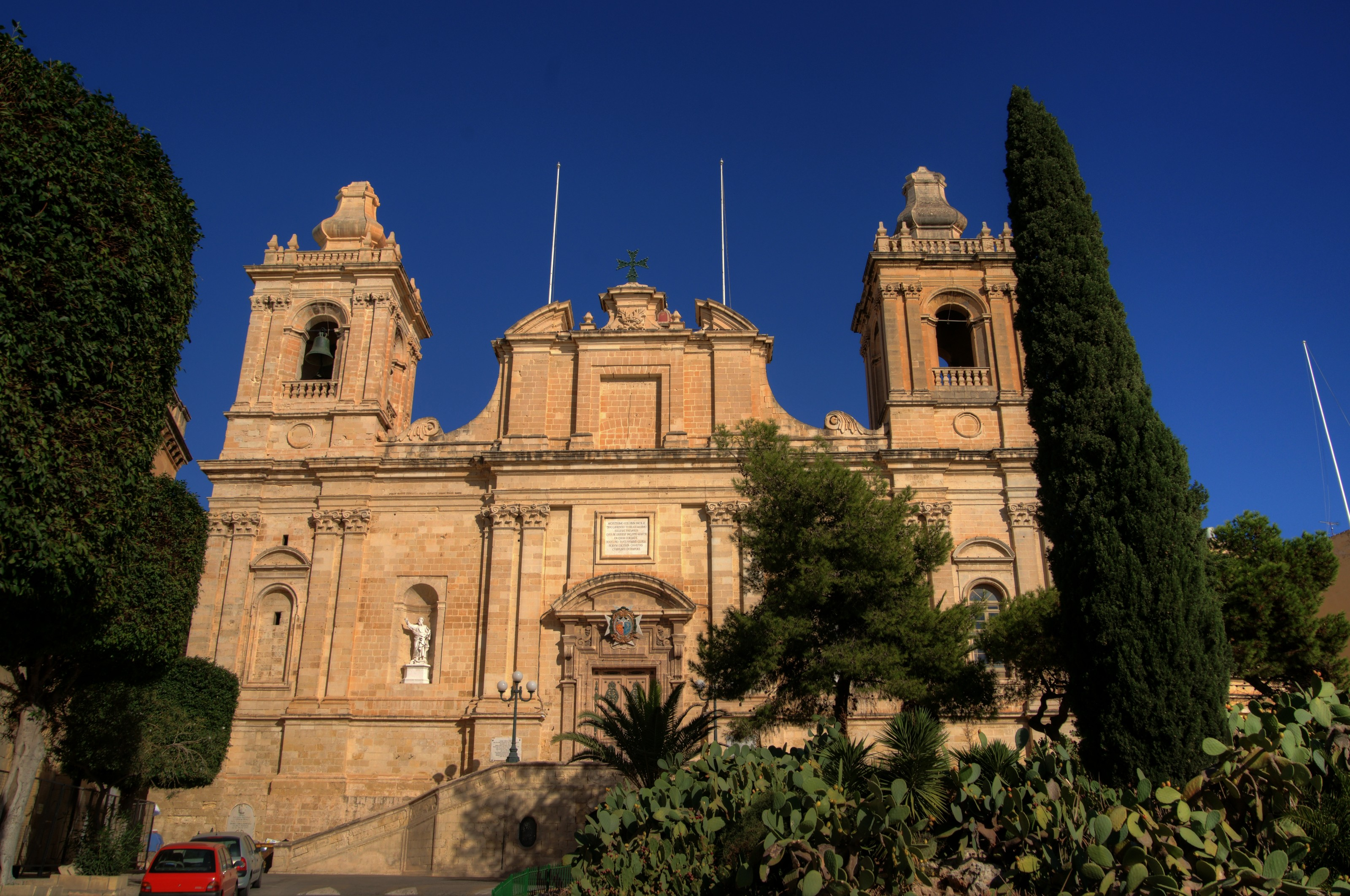
Collegiate Church of St Lawrence

St. Lawrence's Church, one of several churches in the parish, was once the Conventual Church of the Order of St John. It is dedicated to St. Lawrence of Rome, and the feast is very popular among locals for the decorations in the local streets. The celebrations start on 31 July and continue till 10 August, the saint's feast day. Other churches in Birgu include the Monastery of St Scholastica and the Our Lady of Annunciation Church which is run by the Dominican Order. This church is also known as St. Dominic's Church. The feast of Saint Dominic is held every last Sunday of August. The Freedom Monument commemorates the departure of British forces from the island in 1979. Birgu also contains five Auberges of the Knights, including the Auberge d'Angleterre, for some time the home of the English Knights of St John on the island, which now contains a public library.

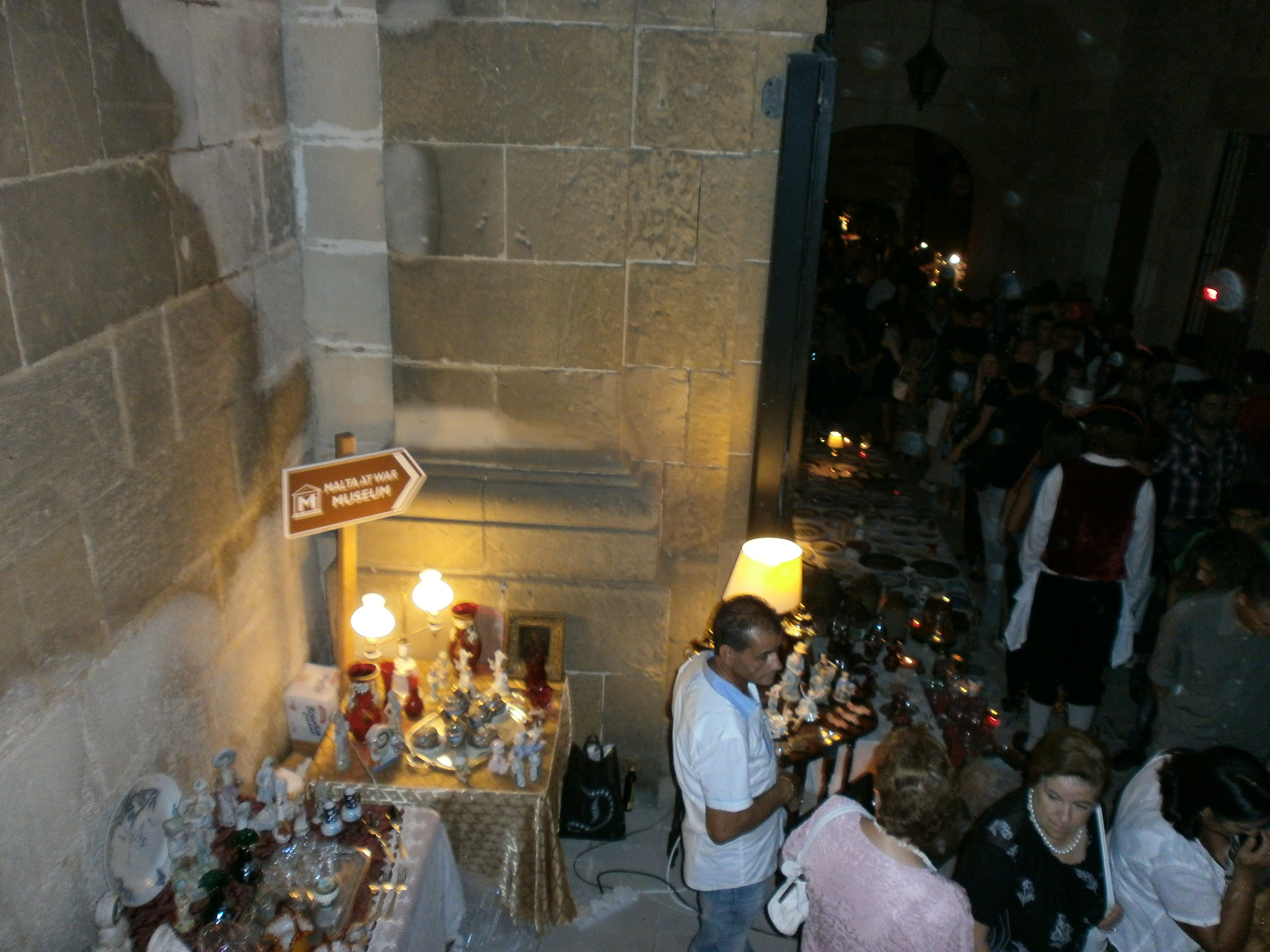
Birgu Festival of Candle Lights

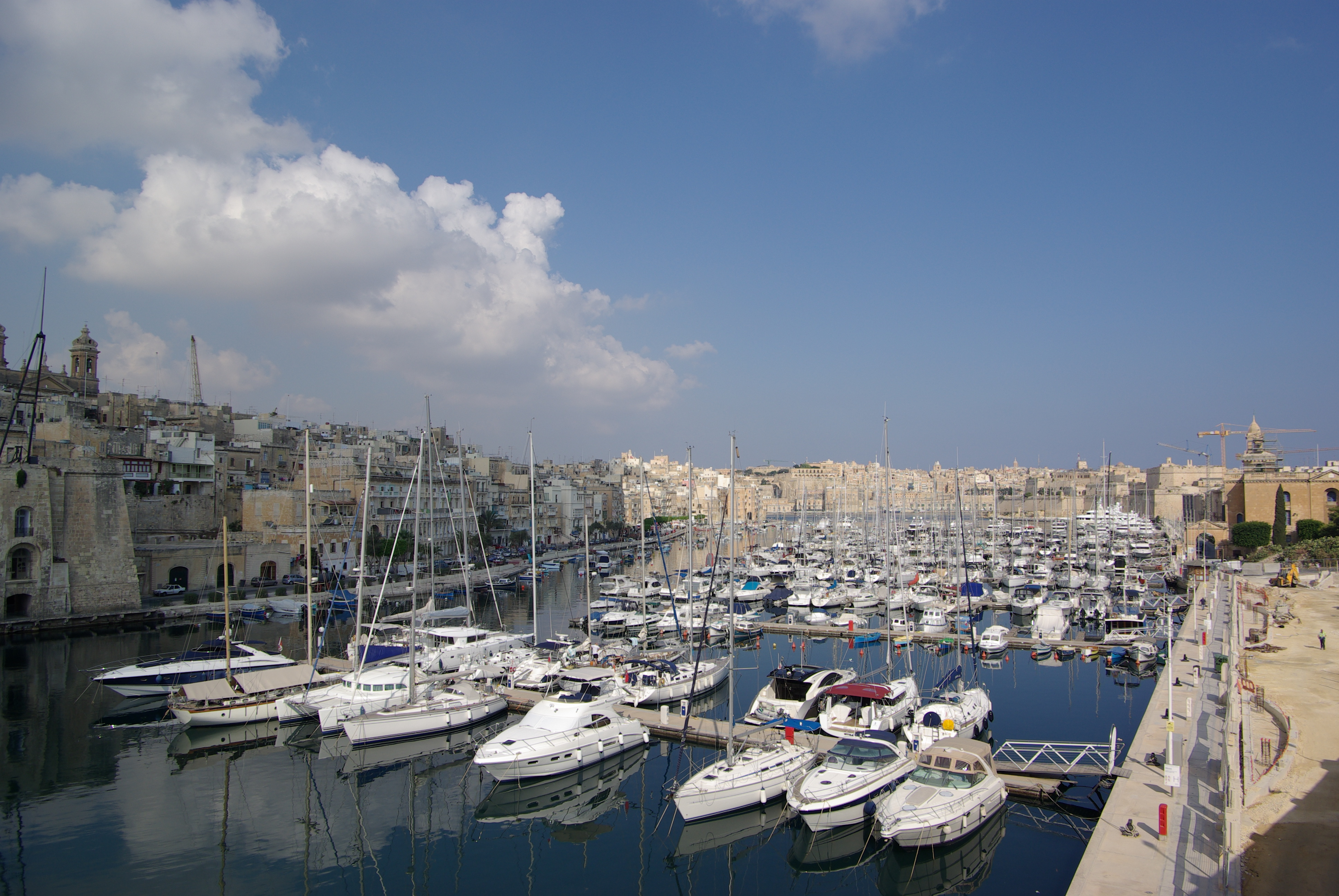
Grand Harbour Marina

At the centre of the Grand Harbour, the 16th-century Fort St Angelo still stands and is currently undergoing restoration. The central piazza in Birgu was badly damaged by bombing during World War II, but one 19th-century palace thought to have been designed by Giuseppe Bonavia survives, and is used as the headquarters of the St Lawrence Band Club.

== Demographics ==
The population of Birgu was 2,289 in July 2024. This included 1187 males and 1102 females; 1893 Maltese nationals and 396 foreign nationals.

In 1901, Birgu had a population of 6,093 people. After falling slightly over the following 20 years, this figure had increased to 6,673 in 1931. However, in 1948 the population stood at just 3,816, although it had increased slightly by 1957. The city's population fell in the following four censuses, and in 2005 was recorded as 2,701. By 2011 the estimated value had risen slightly to 2,758. In March 2013 the population stood at 2,673, and it was slightly lower in March 2014, when it stood at 2,629.

== Government ==
Birgu's local council was established by the Local Councils Act of 1993. The first election was held on 19 February 1994 and John Boxall was elected as mayor. In 1995 Joseph C. Azzopardi took over as mayor but in the 1998 local elections Boxall became the mayor once again. He contested in later elections in 2001, 2004, 2007 and 2012 and has held the office ever since. The present council is made up of the following people:

- John Boxall (PL) - mayor
- Jason Portelli (PL) - vice-mayor
- Ian Barbara (PN)
- Rianne Cini (PL)
- Tristan Duncan (PL)

The Birgu Local Council is housed at Auberge de France.

== Notable people ==
The architects and engineers Girolamo Cassar, his brother Andrew Cassar, and his son Vittorio Cassar were all born in Birgu in the sixteenth century. The Cassar family moved to Valletta after the new city was built in the 1570s.

Architect Lorenzo Gafà (1638–1703), who worked on a number of churches in Malta including St. Paul's Cathedral in Mdina, was born in Birgu. He also designed many of the historic buildings in the Vittoriosa Waterfront area, some of which have recently been restored.

Paul Boffa (1890–1962), the Prime Minister of Malta between 1947 and 1950 and the country's first Labour Party Prime Minister, was also born in the city.

Sr. Beniamina Portelli, founder and director of the St. Monica Choir was born in Birgu.

Prospero Grech (1925–2019) was an Augustinian friar, who co-founded the Patristic Institute Augustinianum in Rome and was created a cardinal in 2012.

=== Honorary citizens ===
People awarded the honorary citizenship of Birgu are:

Date	Name	Notes
27 April 2003	Andrew Bertie	78th Grand Master of the Knights Hospitaller 1988-2008.
15 April 2015	Matthew Festing	79th Grand Master of the Knights Hospitaller 2008-2017.

== Twin towns ==
Birgu is twinned with:

- Licata, Italy
- Saint-Tropez, France

== In fiction ==
Dorothy Dunnett's novel The Disorderly Knights, the third volume of her Lymond Chronicles series, covers the events in Birgu in 1551 around the events of the Dragut Raid.

== Zones in Birgu ==
- Bighi Sally Port
- Couvre Porte
- It-Toqba tal-Birgu
- Post is-Sagra Infirmerija
- Xatt Tal-Birgu
- Xatt il-Forn
- Xatt ir-Risq
- Xatt iż-Żejt
- Xatt Sant' Anġlu
