= Carmelo Pace =

Maltese composer and music professor

Maestro Chev Carmelo Pace
- Born: August 17, 1906; Valletta, Malta
- Died: May 20, 1993 (aged 86)
- Occupations: composer, and a professor of musical theory and harmonics.

Maestro Chev. Carmelo Pace (August 17, 1906 – May 20, 1993) was a Maltese composer, and a professor of music theory and harmony. Born in Valletta, Malta on August 17, 1906, Pace was the eldest of three children. His parents were Anthony Pace and Maria Carmela née Ciappara.

== Education ==
In his childhood, Pace's family lived in an apartment on Strada Mercanti, Valletta, which they shared with his maternal uncle, Vincenzo Ciappara. Ciappara was himself a musician of some repute, and he was Pace's earliest tutor. Pace attended Saint Augustine College in Valletta, where he became very active in the student choir. During frequent visits to his father's workplace at the Commerce movie theatre on Strada Reale in Valletta, Pace became enamoured of the impromptu style of live musical accompaniment played by the resident quartet during screenings of silent films. He soon became a regular player at the movie theatre.

Following an introduction by his uncle, Pace took up the violin under the tutelage of Prof. Carlo Fiamingo, and studied harmony, counterpoint, orchestration and composition with Vincenzo Ciappara, Antonio Genova and Thomas Mayne. In 1931, he received a Diploma in Musical Instruction from the Royal School of Music, London, and promptly took in several students. One of his more notable students was Charles Camilleri.

== World War II and after ==
His early career was interrupted by the outbreak of the Second World War. With Malta under near constant bombardment by the Axis powers, Pace was appointed Shelter Supervisor with responsibility over more than five hundred refugees, and subsequently took a position as a clerk in the Royal Air Force offices in Valletta. As the War raged on, Pace resumed teaching after hours, and even founded a small orchestra for the entertainment of refugees.

The Pace family abandoned their Valletta home after it was demolished by aerial bombardment, and relocated to the town of Sliema on the opposite shore of Marsamxett Harbour.

In 1948 Pace founded and conducted the Malta Cultural Institute Orchestra and Choir to expand opportunities for his music students. He stayed there until 1987, organizing monthly concerts between October and June of each year.

== Musical works ==
A prolific composer, Pace produced over 500 scores throughout his life, including operas, symphonies, concertos and ten numbered string quartets. By the time he was 20 he had composed suites for piano, violin and violoncello, followed by numerous cantatas, orchestral and chamber music, sacred hymns, two ballets, band marches, concertos, and an oratorio. His 1931 composition, Maltesina, a musical fantasy based largely on traditional Maltese folk tunes and għana, was premiered by the Highland Fusiliers' Band in Palace Square. It remains a popular choice among marching bands during Malta's village festa season.

Among his most notable works are four operas, all of which are based on Maltese history, legend and folklore. His first opera, Caterina Desguanez (1965), libretto by Ivo Muscat Azzopardi, tells the story of a Turkish slave who falls in love with his master's daughter. I Martiri (1967), libretto by Vincenzo Maria Pellegrini, features the uprising against the French occupiers in Napoleonic Malta. Angelica (1973), libretto also by Vincenzo Maria Pellegrini, is based on the Maltese legend of the Bride of Mosta. Ipogeana (1976), libretto by Pellegrini, is about Neolithic Malta during the age of the mysterious temple builders.

In 1982 he composed the Stabat Mater for soprano, tenor, bass, mixed choir and orchestra. This was premiered by the St Monica Choir, under the direction of Sister Beniamina Portelli. The popular set of choral pieces L-Imnarja (1960) draws on Maltese folk melodies and rhythms.

Orchestral works include the symphonic overture Simoisius (1929), the Symphonie Dramatique (1931) and the Symphony No. 2 (1966). Pace achieved international recognition when his symphonic poem Jubilamus was played by the Kyoto Symphonic Orchestra during Expo '70 in Japan. His works have also been played in the United States, Russia, England, Wales, France, Italy, Germany, Norway, Sweden, Poland, Egypt, India and Argentina. Charlene Farrugia has recorded the single movement Piano Sonata No. 2 (1975), and his Four Bagatelles (1979).

Carmelo Pace's music is often melodious, but at times quite characteristic of the early 20th century music tendencies. In his more lyrical moments, his music shows some references to versimo as well as Ravelian harmonies. Often of an intimate character, his more adventurous language is more abstract and atonal without necessarily being dodecaphonic.

== Honours and awards ==
In 1955, 1956, 1957 and 1958, Pace took first place in Rediffusion's annual international contest for musical composition. He won a chamber music contest organized by the Performing Rights Society in London in 1962 and again in 1972. In 1975, he took both first and second place in a chamber music contest organized by the Manoel Theatre in Valletta. In 1964, he was created a Knight of the Sovereign, Military and Hospitaller Order of St. John of Jerusalem (the Order of Malta), and in 1992, President Vincent Tabone made him an Officer of the National Order of Merit.

Pace is buried at the Santa Maria Addolorata Cemetery in Paola, the largest burial ground of Malta.

== Archives ==
Following Pace's death, on May 20, 1993, his manuscripts and other works were transferred to the Cathedral Museum in Mdina, although the musical scores to his operas remain at the Manoel Theatre Museum in Valletta.
