= Birgu Clock Tower =

- It-Torri tal-Arloġġ tal-Birgu
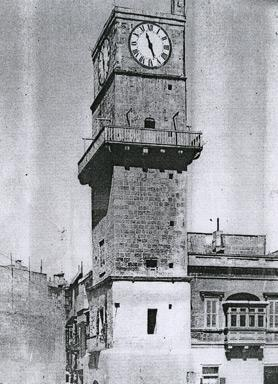
- View of the Birgu Clock Tower c. 1930s or early 1940s
- Interactive map of the Birgu Clock Tower area
- Alternative names: Vittoriosa Clock Tower

General information
- Status: Destroyed
- Type: Clock tower
- Architectural style: Siculo-Norman
- Location: Birgu, Malta
- Coordinates: 35°53′16.9″N 14°31′19″E
- Construction started: Middle Ages
- Renovated: possibly rebuilt 1549
- Destroyed: April 1942 (bombed); October 1944 (ruins cleared)

Height
- Height: 40 m (130 ft)

Technical details
- Material: Limestone
- Floor count: 5

The Birgu Clock Tower (Maltese: It-Torri tal-Arloġġ tal-Birgu), also called the Vittoriosa Clock Tower and originally the Civic Clock Tower, was a clock tower in Birgu, Malta. It was located in Victory Square, the city's main square, and it was a prominent landmark in Birgu and the rest of the Three Cities. The tower was probably built in the Middle Ages, although some sources state that it was constructed in 1549. It served as a watchtower since it had views over the Grand Harbour and the surrounding countryside, and it saw use during the Great Siege of Malta in 1565. A clock was installed in the tower in the 17th century.

The building was destroyed by aerial bombardment during World War II. Some of its foundations still exist, and plans have been made for rebuilding the structure.

== History ==
The Birgu Clock Tower is believed to have been built in the medieval period as a watchtower, and had views of the Grand Harbour and the surrounding countryside. An alarm bell was installed in the tower in 1504.

Following the arrival of the Order of St. John in Malta, their coat of arms and the date 1549 were inscribed on the façade. According to some sources, the tower was rebuilt at this point.

According to Francisco Balbi di Correggio, Grand Master Jean Parisot de Valette used the tower for surveillance during the Great Siege of Malta in 1565. Following the transfer of the capital city from Birgu to Valletta, in 1572 the Order sold part of the tower to a family from Għaxaq, who used it as a private residence.

The upper parts of the tower remained public property. A clock was placed on the tower's top floor in 1629 that was built to the designs of Antonio Garsin, during the magistracy of Antoine de Paule, and this was commemorated by a Latin inscription on the tower which read;

Evantunellu Carbuni

me fecit nobili civitati
Messanæ
MCCCCCIIII
(Meaning: alarm bell - requested [paid] by city nobles - [manufactured in] Messina - 1504)

In 1921, a marble tablet commemorating Malta's new constitution was affixed to the tower. The tower was included on the Antiquities List of 1925.

=== Destruction ===
During World War II, Birgu was heavily bombarded by Italian and German bombers due to its proximity to the Malta Dockyard. On 4 April 1942, a bomb fell close to the tower. Part of the structure collapsed on the night between 11 and 12 April due to the damage sustained. The remaining part of the tower was hit again two weeks later, causing further damage. The ruins were completely demolished in October 1944.

Most of the mechanism of the clock still exist, and it is in storage at the local council premises. The clock's hands are displayed at the Church Museum in Birgu and Palazzo Falson in Mdina.

=== Plans for reconstruction ===
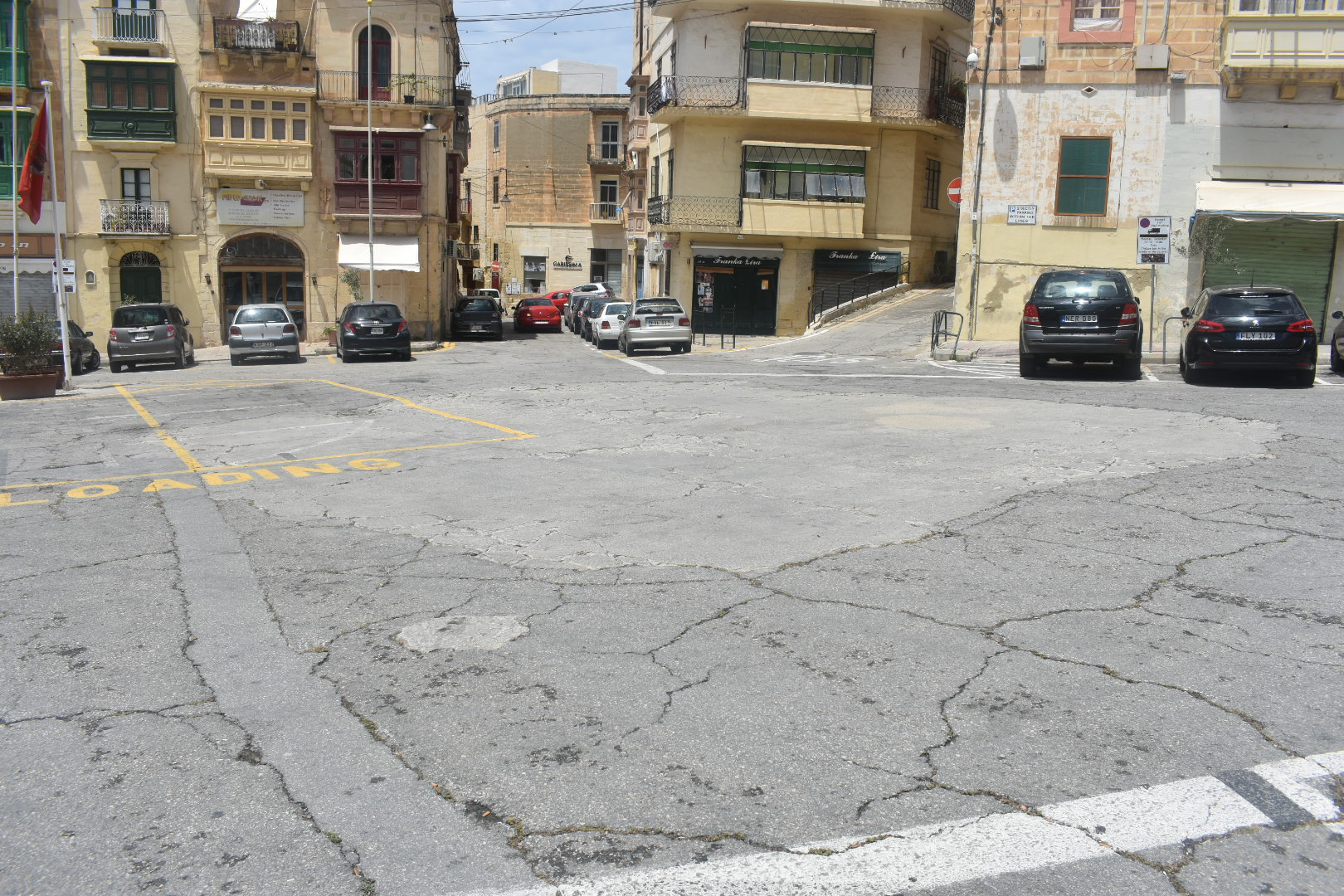
Victory Square before the regeneration in 2025, with the patch of lighter tarmac showing where the clock tower stood

The debate as to whether or not to rebuild the tower began soon after its destruction. The Historical and Cultural Society of Vittoriosa organized a meeting requesting the rebuilding of the tower on 19 December 1954.

In 2004, part of the tower's foundations consisting of original cut rock on site was uncovered during an archaeological excavation by the Superintendence of Cultural Heritage. This find caused a dispute among Birgu residents as to whether the tower should be rebuilt or not. Some argued that it is a historical site which deserves to be rebuilt, while others said that it would not be the same as the original, and it would take up scarce parking spaces.

In the budget of 2006, the Government of Malta voted funds for rebuilding the tower. The Birgu Local Council agreed on rebuilding it during a council meeting on 26 April 2007, and submitted a development permit to construct the replica. In January 2015, The Alfred Mizzi Foundation announced that it will finance the reconstruction of the tower, to coincide with the 450th anniversary of the 1565 siege. The replica is estimated to cost around €300,000. This move was welcomed by the Birgu Local Council and the Ministry of Infrastructure.

In July 2015, Birgu mayor John Boxall announced that a referendum might be held among Birgu residents in order to decide whether or not to rebuild the tower.

== Architecture ==
The tower had a quadrilateral plan, and it was around 40 m (130 ft) high. It had five floors of different heights, with a balcony supported on corbels surrounding the fourth floor. A small turret was located on one corner of the tower.
