= Shickluna Shipyard =

Former shipyard in St. Catharines, Ontario

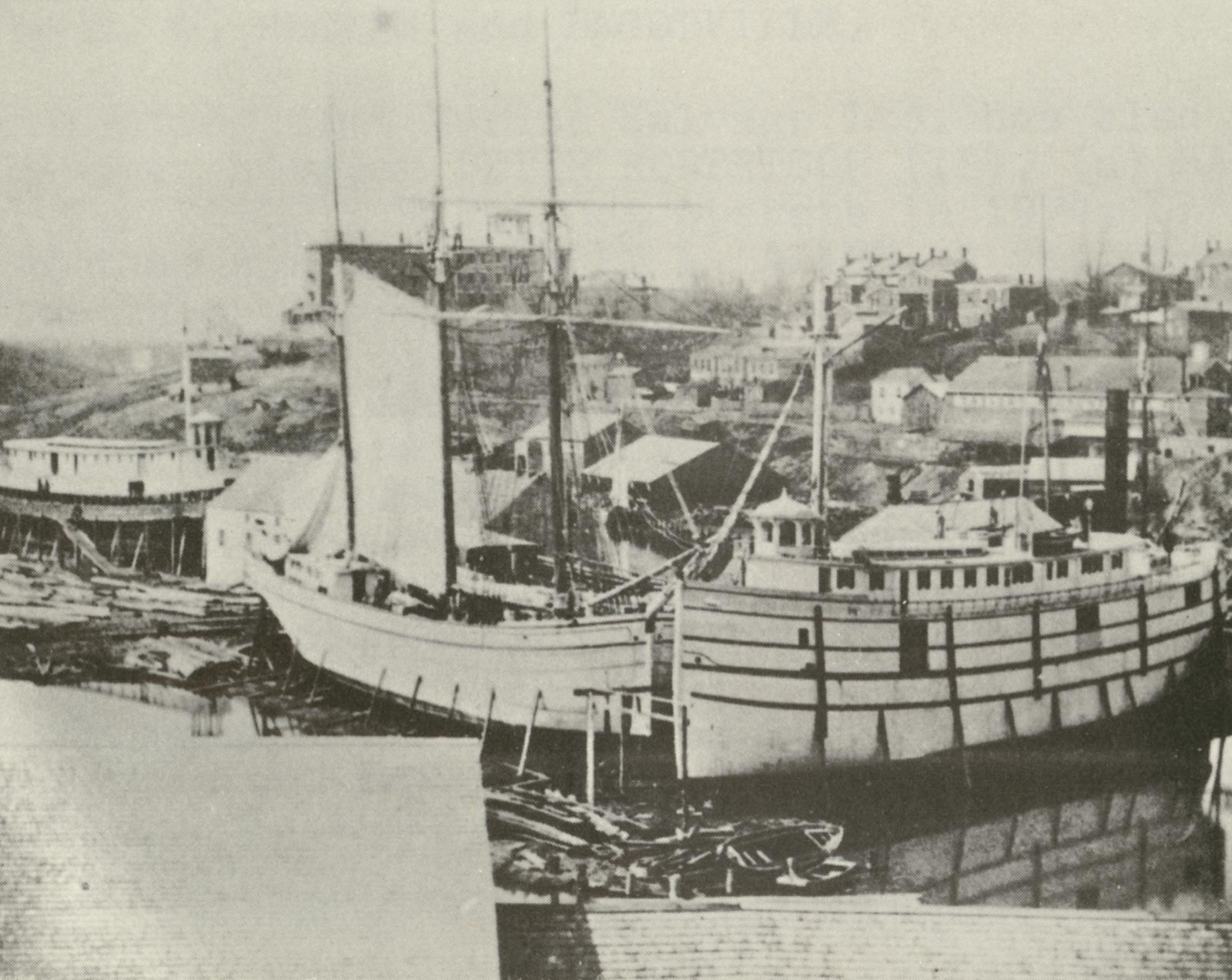
The shipyard as photographed in 1863

The Shickluna Shipyard was crucial to the early history of Downtown St. Catharines. It operated from 1838 to 1901. A previous shipyard existed in the location before Louis Shickluna started his own. During his lifetime, an estimated 150 ships were built in the shipyard.

== History ==
The shipyard's namesake is Louis Shickluna, who emigrated from Malta. He was from a family of shipbuilders. He started working in a shipyard when he was 11 at the Royal Navy in Valletta. Shickluna emigrated after the local economy worsened so he could find work. At first, he worked in Youngstown, New York. Shickluna later moved to Trois-Rivières, Quebec, where he helped build the SS Royal William. In 1836, he began leasing land for his own business in St. Catharines from William Hamilton Merritt for $15 annually. He hired more than 300 employees, many of whom were former slaves from the United States. The location was ideal for a shipyard thanks to its proximity to the Welland Canal and the Great Lakes. Shickluna invented the snub-nosed schooner design for use in ships traversing these waters. After Shickluna's death in 1880, his son ran the shipyard until 1891. Then it was leased to the St. Catharines Box and Basket Company until 1901.

== Legacy ==
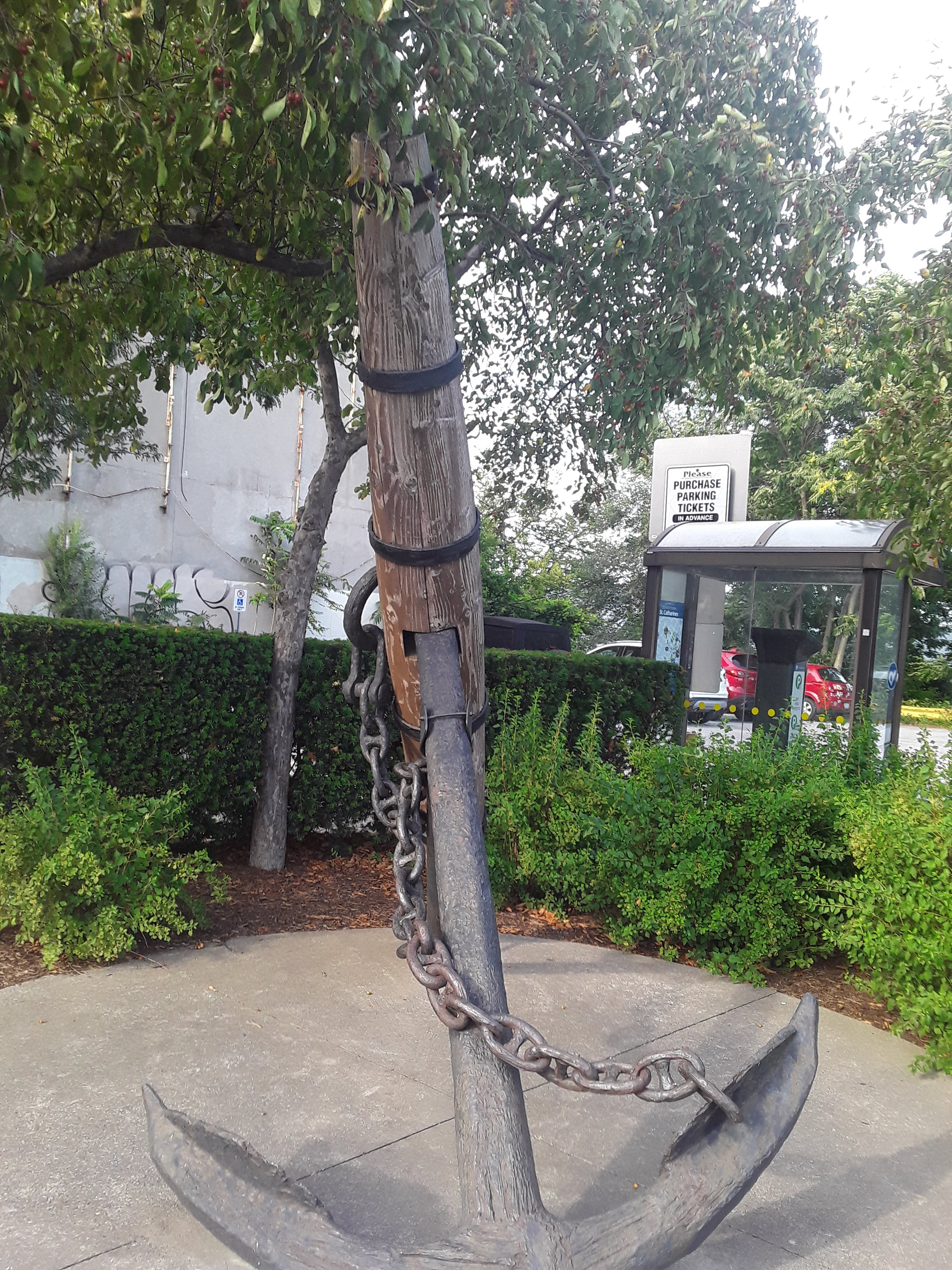
Monument commemorating the history of Shickluna Shipyard in Downtown St. Catharines

The site of the former shipyard is near Burgoyne Bridge and the Twelve Mile Creek. This location has been the subject of archaeology digs. These digs began in 2019 but were halted due to the COVID-19 pandemic in Ontario, before resuming in 2022. The archaeology team was led by Kimberly Monk, a history professor at Brock University. She and other researchers recovered 2,000 artifacts from the site. The work was funded through a federal grant and corporate sponsors.

A plaque commemorating Shickluna is present near the Welland Canal. A mural commemorating the shipyard was produced by Matthew Vizbulis. His work was commissioned by the St. Catharines Downtown Association.
