= Cottonera dialect =

Dialect of the Maltese Language

- Kottoneran
- Pronunciation: [kɔtːɔnɛˈrɐn]
- Region: Three Cities and surrounding area
- Native speakers: About 10,000 (2014)
- Language family: Afro-Asiatic: Semitic; West Semitic; Central Semitic; Arabic; Maghrebi Arabic; Pre-Hilalian; Sicilian Arabic; Maltese; Cottonera dialect
- Writing system: Maltese alphabet

Language codes
- ISO 639-3: –

One of the dialects of the Maltese language is the Cottonera dialect, known to locals as Kottoneran. Many inhabitants of the Three Cities speak the local dialect, and thus roughly amount to 10,000 speakers.

The most distinctive feature of this dialect is its treatment of vowels i and u after the silent consonant għ. In Standard Maltese, and other dialects, these vowels are realized as diphthongs after għ. However, in most situations, they remain monophthongs in the Cottonera dialect.

== The vowel I after Għ ==
The vowel i after għ remains an /i/ as in the English fleece, instead of diphthongizing to /ai/ as in the English price.

| English | Standard Maltese | Cottonera dialect |
|---|---|---|
| my/mine | tiegħi [ˈtiɐɪ] | tiegħi [ˈtiːɪ] |
| he curses | jidgħi [ˈjɪdɐɪ] | jidgħi [ˈjɪdɪ] |
| with me | miegħi [ˈmiɐɪ] | miegħi [ˈmiːɪ] |

This dialectal change does not occur with the words għid (easter), erbgħin (forty), sebgħin (seventy), and disgħin (ninety).

The local poet from Senglea, Dwardu Cachia (1858–1907), formed part of the Xirka Xemija in 1882, an organization which formulated one of the first standardized versions of written Maltese. Moreover, Cachia wrote a poem about this very alphabet, in which he made use of the 4-line rhyme. Coincidentally, the ABCB rhyme of the second stanza only works if read in his Cottonera dialect.

"Ebda ħażż ma jibdel leħnu
fil-fonetiku, qed ingħid:
Ga, Ge, Gi ibsin jinstemgħu
"Għax tgħid", ħadthom bla taħbit"

— Dwardu Cachia (1858–1907)
Translation:

[ɪˈniːt], not [ɪˈnɐɪt]

[tɐhˈbiːt]

== The vowel U after Għ ==
The vowel u after għ remains an /u:/ as in the English goose, instead of diphthongizing to /au/ as in the English mouth.

| English | Standard Maltese | Cottonera dialect |
|---|---|---|
| his | tiegħu [ˈtiɐu] | tiegħu [ˈtiːʊ] |
| sent (passive participle) | mibgħut [mɪˈbɐʊt] | mibgħut [mɪˈbuːt] |
| a piece of wood | għuda [ˈɐʊdɐ] | għuda [ˈuːdɐ] |
| we can/could | nistgħu [ˈnɪstɐʊ] | nistgħu [ˈnɪstʊ] |
| we sell | nbigħu [mˈbiɐʊ] | nbigħu [mˈbiːʊ] |
| with him | miegħu [ˈmiɐʊ] | miegħu [ˈmiːʊ] |

== The vowel E after Għ ==
Although in contemporary Maltese (21st Century), the combination għe sometimes produces an /a/ vowel, the Cottonera dialect has widely kept the /e~i/ realization comparable to Standard Maltese.

| English | Standard Maltese | Cottonera dialect | Contemporary Maltese |
|---|---|---|---|
| she remained | baqgħet [ˈbɐʔɛt] | baqgħet [ˈbɐʔɛt] / [ˈbɐqɪt] | baqgħet [ˈbɐʔɐt] |
| she fell | waqgħet [ˈwɐʔɛt] | waqgħet [ˈwɐʔɛt] / [ˈwɐqɪt] | waqgħet [ˈwɐʔɐt] |
| he tired them | għejjiehom [ɛjˈjiːɔm] | għejjiehom [ɛjˈjiːɔm] | għejjiehom [ɐjˈjiːɔm] |

== The consonant Q ==
In Cottonera, most notably among the eldest demographic of Senglea, the consonant q is still pronounced as a voiceless uvular plosive /q/, as its counterpart in Classical Arabic. This sound survived in Modern Maltese only through the Cottonera dialect, instead of being replaced with the Standard glottal stop /ʔ/. However, it is severely in decline.

| English | Standard Maltese | Cottonera dialect (archaic pronunciation) |
|---|---|---|
| never | qatt [ʔɐtt] | qatt [qɐtt] |
| he told me | qalli [ˈʔɐllɪ] | qalli [ˈqɐllɪ] |
| we reside | noqogħdu [nɔˈʔɔːdʊ] | noqogħdu [nɔˈqɔːdʊ] |
| artichokes | qaqoċċ [ʔɐˈʔɔtʃtʃ] | qaqoċċ [qɐˈqɔtʃtʃ] |
| poverty | faqar [ˈfɐʔɐr] | faqar [ˈfɐqɐr] |
| he reached | laħaq [ˈlɐhɐʔ] | laħaq [ˈlɐhɐq] |
