= Benigno Zerafa =

Benigno Zerafa (1726–1804) was a Maltese composer. He studied first under Pietro Gristi, maestro di capella at St. Paul's Cathedral, Mdina, and from 1738 with Girolamo Abos at the Conservatorio dei Poveri di Gesù Cristo in Naples. He himself was appointed maestro di capella at Mdina Cathedral in 1744 until 1787, when he retired from the position and was succeeded by his assistant Francesco Azopardi. Eighty-three substantial sacred compositions survive at Mdina Cathedral.

Recordings:

- Confitebor Tölzer Knabenchor, SM 1997
