= List of Maltese people =

This is a list of notable Maltese people including those not born in, or current residents of, Malta; they are Maltese nationals.

== Actors ==
- Angelo Muscat (1930–1977)
- Anthony J. Mifsud - actor, (singer, songwriter)
- Charles Clews (1919–2009)
- Charles Thake (1927–2018)
- Davide Tucci (born 1987) – actor
- Eileen Montesin
- Ivan De Battista (born 1977)
- Joseph Calleia (1897–1975)
- Joseph Gatt (born 1974) actor, model, voice artist
- Madeleine Collinson (1952–2014) – actress, model
- Marisa Abela (born 1996)
- Mary Collinson (1952-2021) – actress, model, twin sister of Madeleine Collinson
- Simone De Battista (born 1977)
- Terry Camilleri (born 1949)
- Valerie Buhagiar (born 1964)

== Architects ==
- Andrea Belli (1703–1772) – architect and businessman
- Andrea Vassallo (1856–1928) – eclectic architect
- Antonio Cachia (1739–1813) – architect, civil and military engineer and archaeologist
- Antonio Falzon (16th century) – military engineer, worked in Germany
- Carlo Gimach (1651–1730) – architect, engineer and poet
- Cesar Castellani (died 1905) – worked in Guyana
- Domenico Cachia (c. 1690–1761) – master builder
- Emanuele Luigi Galizia (1830–1907) – designed many public buildings
- Francesco Zerafa (1679–1758) – architect and capomastro
- Giorgio Costantino Schinas (1834–1894) – architect and civil engineer
- Giorgio Grognet de Vassé (1774–1862) – architect and antiquarian
- Giorgio Pullicino (1779–1851) – painter and architect
- Giovanni Attard (c. 1570–1636) – architect, military engineer and stone carver
- Giovanni Barbara (1642–1728) – architect and military engineer
- Girolamo Cassar (c. 1520 – c. 1592) – designed many buildings in Valletta
- Giuseppe Bonavia (1821–1885) – draughtsman and architect
- Giuseppe Bonici (1707–1779) – architect and military engineer
- Giuseppe Psaila (1891–1960) – Art Nouveau architect
- Gustavo R. Vincenti (1888–1974) – architect and developer
- Isabelle Barratt-Delia (born 1938) – architect
- Joseph G. Huntingford (1926–1994) – Modernist architect
- Lorenzo Gafà (1638–1703) – Baroque architect
- Michele Cachia (1760–1839) – architect and military engineer
- Richard England (born 1937)
- Roger de Giorgio (1922–2016) – architect
- Tommaso Dingli (1591–1666) – designed various churches
- Vittorio Cassar (c. 1550 – c. 1609) – military engineer

== Composers ==
- Albert Garzia (born 1977)
- Alessandro Curmi (1801–1857)
- Benigno Zerafa (1726–1804)
- Carmelo Pace (1906–1993) – composer, professor of musical theory and harmonics
- Charles Camilleri (1931–2008)
- Francesco Azopardi (1748–1809)
- Girolamo Abos (1715–1760)
- Nicolas Isouard (1775–1818)
- Reuben Pace (born 1974)
- Robert Samut (1869–1934) – composer of "L-Innu Malti" (the national anthem of Malta), professor of physiology and bacteriology

== Filmmakers ==
- Jon Cassar (born 1958) – director; producer
- Rebecca Cremona – director

== Military figures ==
- Antonio Williams (1825–1908) – United States Navy seaman
- Brigadier Martin Xuereb (born 1968) – former commander of the Armed Forces of Malta
- Clemente Tabone (c. 1575–1665) – landowner and militia member
- Juan Bautista Azopardo (1772–1848) – founder of the Argentine Navy
- Orlando E. Caruana (1844–1917) – fought during the American Civil War
- Toni Bajada (16th century) – spy during the Great Siege of Malta

== Military figures - Siege of Malta (1798–1800) ==
- Emmanuele Vitale (1758–1802) – general of the Maltese forces and representing Città Vecchia or Città Notabile (Mdina), Rabat and Dingli
- Don Francesco Saverio Caruana – rebel leader
- Vincenzo Borg – rebel leader and representing Birkirkara

Other National Assembly representatives coordinating the Maltese Battalions:

- Chierico Giuseppe Abdilla for Safi
- Notary Pietro Buttigieg for Zebbug
- Michele Cachia for Zejtun
- Parish Priest Don Felice Calleja for Mosta
- Parish Priest Don Bartolomeo Caraffa for Mqabba
- Rev. Fr. Giuseppe Casha for Luqa
- Filippo Castagna for Gudja
- Parish Priest Don Salvatore Corso for Siggiewi
- Rev. Fortunato Dalli for Zurrieq
- Giuseppe Frendo for Balzan
- Chevalier Giovanni Gafa' for Gharghur
- Salvatore Gafà for Lia (Lija)
- Stanislao Gatt for Casal Fornaro (Qormi)
- Don Pietro Mallia for Ghaxaq
- Gregorio Mifsud for Qrendi
- Giuseppe Montebello for Tarxien
- Chev. Baron Paolo Parisio Muscati for Naxxar
- Agostino Sayd for Zabbar
- Dr Enrico Xerri for Kirkop
- Notary Saverio Zarb for Attard

Leaders of the Gozitan Battalion:

- Leader: Rev Saver Cassar, Archpriest of the Matrice assisted by Fortunato Spiteri
- Tommaso Cassar and Felice Grech for Gharb
- Liberato Grech and Liberato Sultana for Xagħra
- Giuseppe Grima and Martino Asciak for Zebbug
- Dr Francesco Pace for Rabat
- Angelo Vella and Giuseppe Zammit for Sannat
- Francesco Zammit and Francesco Refalo for Xewkija

== Musicians (including singers) ==
- Aidan Zammit (born 1965) – composer, musician and singer
- Albert Garzia (born 1977) – composer and musician
- Amber Bondin (born 1991) – singer
- Anthony J. Mifsud – singer-songwriter
- Antoinette Miggiani (born 1937) – opera singer
- Antonio Olivari (born 1980) – songwriter and composer
- Brent Muscat (born 1967) – guitarist
- Capitol K – musician
- Chiara Siracusa (born 1976) – singer
- Christabelle (born 1992) – singer-songwriter
- Claudette Pace (born 1968) – singer and politician
- Claudia Faniello (born 1988) – singer
- Daniel Testa (born 1997) – singer, radio and television presenter
- Debbie Scerri (born 1969) – singer and television presenter
- Destiny Chukunyere (born 2002) – singer, winner of the Junior Eurovision Song Contest 2015
- Eleanor Cassar (born 1982) – singer
- Emma Muscat (born 1999) singer, model (from one of Malta's wealthiest families)
- Enzo Gusman (1947-2021) broadcaster – singer-songwriter
- Fabrizio Faniello (born 1981) – singer
- Federica Falzon (born 2003) – operatic pop singer
- Freddie Portelli (born 1944) – singer-songwriter
- Gabriela N (born 1993) – singer-songwriter
- Gaia Cauchi (born 2002) – child singer, winner of the Junior Eurovision Song Contest 2013
- Gerard James Borg – songwriter
- Gianluca Bezzina (born 1989) – singer; medical doctor
- Glen Vella (born 1983) – singer
- Hooligan (born 1980) – rapper
- Ira Losco (born 1981) – singer-songwriter
- Jes Psaila (born 1964) – guitarist
- Joe C. (1974–2000) – rapper; of Maltese descent
- Joe Camilleri (born 1948) – singer-songwriter; saxophonist
- Joe Grech (born 1934) – singer-songwriter
- Joseph Calleja (born 1978) – tenor singer
- Julie Zahra (born 1982) – singer, member Parliament of Malta
- Kevin Borg (born 1986) – singer-songwriter; producer; winner of the Swedish reality-competition talent show Idol 2008
- Kurt Calleja (born 1989) – singer
- La Barokka – singer
- Lawrence Gray (born 1975) – singer
- Ludwig Galea (born 1977) – singer
- Lydia Caruana – soprano
- Lynn Chircop (born 1980) – singer and television presenter
- Marc Storace (born 1949) – singer of the Swiss hard-rock band Krokus
- Mario Vella (born 1976) – singer and songwriter, frontman of Brikkuni
- Martin Grech (born 1983) – singer-songwriter
- Mary Spiteri (born 1947) – singer
- Melissa Tkautz (born 1974) – singer
- Miriam Christine (born 1978) – singer
- Miriam Gauci – opera singer
- Miriana Conte – singer
- Morena (born 1984) – singer
- Muxu (born 1990) – singer-songwriter
- Natalie Gauci (born 1981) – singer
- Nicky Bomba (born 1963) – drummer; leads the Australian funk and reggae band Bomba.
- Olivia Lewis (born 1978) – singer
- Oreste Kirkop (1923–1998) – opera singer; film actor
- Pawlu Camilleri (born 1958) – harmonica musician
- Philip Vella
- Renato Micallef (born 1951) – pop singer
- Renzo Spiteri – percussionist
- Robert Galea (born 1981) – Christian singer-songwriter
- Roger Scannura – flamenco guitarist
- Rosa Judge (born 1919) – musician
- Sarah Bonnici (born 1998) – singer
- Sarah Harrison (born 1993) – singer, DJ, producer, musician
- Sebastian Calleja (born 1998) – singer; winner OGAE Eurovision Weekend 2016 Berlin, Germany
- Sharleen Spiteri (born 1967) – singer-songwriter; guitarist; lead vocalist of the Scottish pop-rock band Texas
- Sigmund Mifsud – trumpeter, CEO Malta Philharmonic Orchestra
- Stefan Galea (born 1996) – singer
- Thea Garrett (born 1992) – singer
- Tony Camilleri (born 1949) – singer
- Veronica Rotin (born 2004) – child singer
- Walter Micallef (born 1955) – singer-songwriter
- William Mangion (born 1958) – singer

== Painters and sculptors ==
- Alberto Pullicino (1719–1759) – painter
- Alessio Erardi (1669–1727) – painter
- Amedeo Preziosi (1816–1882) – painter
- Andrew Micallef (born 1969) – painter and musician
- Antoine Camilleri (1922–2005) – painter; teacher; stamp designer
- Antonio Sciortino (1879–1947) – sculptor
- Carlo Zimech (1696–1766) – painter and priest
- Debbie Caruana Dingli (born 1962) – painter
- Edward Caruana Dingli (1876–1950) – painter
- Emvin Cremona (1919–1987) – painter; stamp designer
- Francesco Noletti (1611–1654) – Baroque painter
- Francesco Zahra (1710–1773) – painter
- Gabriel Caruana (1929–2018) – artist
- Gianni Vella (1885–1977) – painter
- Gio Nicola Buhagiar (1698–1752) – painter
- Giorgio Pullicino (1779–1851) – painter and architect
- Giuseppe Calì (1846–1930) – painter
- Isabelle Borg (1959–2010) – painter
- Jean Zaleski (1920–2010) – Maltese-American painter
- Maria de Dominici (1645–1703) – Baroque painter & sculptor
- Melchiorre Gafà (1636–1667) – Baroque sculptor
- Pietro Erardi (1644–1727) – painter; chaplain
- Pietro Paolo Troisi (1686–1743) – sculptor, silversmith, designer, engraver
- Stefano Erardi (1630–1716) – painter
- Tony Briffa (artist) (born 1959)
- Vincent Apap (1909–2003) – sculptor
- Vincenzo Dimech (1768–1831) – sculptor
- Willie Apap (1918–1970) – painter

== Poets and writers ==
- Antoine Cassar (born 1978) – poet
- Anton Buttigieg (1912–1983) – poet
- Anton Sammut – author
- Carlo Gimach (1651–1730) – architect, engineer and poet
- Clare Azzopardi (born 1977) – writer
- Daphne Caruana Galizia (1964–2017) – journalist; writer; activist
- Doreen Micallef (1949–2001) – poet
- Dun Karm Psaila (1871–1961) – poet; lyricist of the national anthem of Malta
- Elizabeth Grech (born 1978) – writer; poet; translator
- Francis Ebejer (1925–1993) – dramatist; novelist
- Frans Sammut (1945–2011) – novelist, short-story writer, essayist, historian
- Immanuel Mifsud (born 1967) – novelist; poet
- Joe Friggieri (born 1946) – philosophy professor; poet
- John Peter Portelli (born 1954) – professor, poet
- Karl Schembri (born 1978) – poet; novelist; journalist
- Louis Briffa (born 1971) – poet
- Mario Vella (born 1953) – poet; philosopher; economist; political theorist
- Marjanu Vella (1927–1988) – poet; writer
- Mark Camilleri (born 1988) – historian, writer, publisher
- Mary Meilak (1905–1975) – poet
- Michael Zammit (born 1954) – philosophy professor; poet
- Nadia Mifsud (born 1976) – poet; writer; literary translator
- Oliver Friggieri (1947–2020) – novelist; poet; minor philosopher
- Pierre J. Mejlak (born 1982) – short-story writer
- Pietru Caxaro (c. 1400–1485) – poet; philosopher
- Ray Buttigieg (born 1955) – composer; poet; producer
- Rużar Briffa (1906–1963) – poet
- Saviour Pirotta (born 1958) – author and playwright
- Trevor Żahra (born 1947) – novelist, poet and illustrator

== Politicians ==
- Agatha Barbara (1923–2002) – government minister; member, Parliament of Malta; President of Malta (1982–1987)
- Albert Hyzler (1916–1993) – Acting President of Malta (1981–1982)
- Alfred Sant (born 1948) – Prime Minister of Malta (1996–1998)
- Anthony Mamo (1909–2008) – Governor-General of Malta (1971–1974); President of Malta (1974–1976)
- Anton Buttigieg (1912–1983) – President of Malta (1976–1981)
- Arnold Cassola (born 1956) – professor of comparative literature; former chairperson, Democratic Alternative
- Carm Lino Spiteri (1932–2008) – Nationalist Party politician
- Ċensu Tabone (1913–2012) – government minister; President of Malta (1989–1994)
- Ċettina Darmenia Brincat (1931–2023) – businesswoman and politician
- Claudette Abela Baldacchino (born 1973), journalist, Labour Party politician and Member of the European Parliament
- Cyrus Engerer (born 1981) – Member of European Parliament (2020-present)
- Dom Mintoff (1916–2012) – Prime Minister of Malta (1955–1958, 1971–1984)
- Eddie Fenech Adami (born 1934) – Prime Minister of Malta (1987–1996, 1998–2004); President of Malta (2004–2009)
- Enrico Mizzi (1885–1950) – Prime Minister of Malta (1950)
- Francesco Buhagiar (1876–1934) – Prime Minister of Malta (1923–1924)
- Francesco Masini (1894–1964) – founder, Gozo Party; member, Parliament of Malta (1947–1950)
- George Abela (born 1948) – President of Malta (2009–2014)
- George Borg Olivier (1911–1980) – Prime Minister of Malta (1950–1955, 1962–1971)
- George William Vella (born 1942) – government minister; Deputy Prime Minister of Malta (1996–1998)
- Gerald Strickland (1861–1940) – Prime Minister of Malta (1927–1932); Governor of Tasmania; Governor of Western Australia; Governor of New South Wales
- Giovanni Felice (1899–1977) – Minister of Industry and Tourism (1962–1966); Finance Minister of Malta (1966–1971) in the Giorgio Borġ Olivier cabinet
- Guido de Marco (1931–2010) – Deputy Prime Minister of Malta; President of Malta (1999–2004)
- Joe Borg (born 1952) – European Commissioner for Maritime Affairs and Fisheries; European Commissioner for Humanitarian Aid and Civil Protection
- Joe Debono Grech (born 1939) – member, Parliament of Malta (since 1971)
- John Aquilina (born 1950) – Australian politician and Maltese diplomat
- John Dalli (born 1948) – European Commissioner for Health and Consumer Policy (2010–2012)
- Joseph Cefai (1921–1996) – member, Parliament of Malta (1947–1953); Secretary of Gozo Affairs (until 1981)
- Joseph Flores (1907–1974) – Speaker of the House of Representatives of Malta; judge
- Joseph Howard (1862–1925) – Prime Minister of Malta (1921–1923)
- Joseph Muscat (born 1974) – Member of the European Parliament (2004–2008); leader, Labour Party (2008–2020), Prime Minister of Malta (2013–2020)
- Karmenu Mifsud Bonnici (born 1933) – Prime Minister of Malta (1984–1987)
- Lawrence Gonzi (born 1953) – Prime Minister of Malta (2004–2013)
- Leo Brincat – Member of the European Court of Auditors
- Lorry Sant (1937–1995) – government minister
- Louis Grech (born 1947) – Deputy Prime Minister of Malta (since 2013)
- Mabel Strickland, journalist, newspaper proprietor and politician, daughter of the above
- Manwel Dimech (1860–1921) – politician; social reformer; philosopher; journalist; writer
- Marie Louise Coleiro Preca (born 1958) – President of Malta (since 2014)
- Myriam Spiteri Debono (born 1952) – President of Malta (2024–)
- Norman Lowell (born 1946) – founder and leader, Imperium Europa
- Paul Boffa (1890–1962) – Prime Minister of Malta (1947–1950)
- Paul Xuereb (1923–1994) – Speaker of the House of Representatives of Malta (1986–1987); Acting President of Malta (1987–1989)
- Robert Abela (born 1977) – Prime Minister of Malta (since 2020)
- Simon Busuttil (born 1969) – leader, Nationalist Party (2013-2017), Member of European Parliament (2004-2013)
- Tonio Borg (born 1957) – European Commissioner for Health and Consumer Policy
- Ugo Mifsud Bonnici (born 1932) – government minister; President of Malta (1994–1999)
- Wistin Abela (1933–2014) – Deputy Prime Minister of Malta (1981–1983)
- Sir Ugo Pasquale Mifsud (1889–1942) – Prime Minister of Malta (1932–1933)

== Religious dignitaries ==
- Donat Spiteri (1922–2011) – Biblical scholar; founder and editor, booklet Kliem il-Hajja (English language: The Word of Life)
- Dun Mikiel Xerri (1737–1799) – national hero of Malta
- Joseph De Piro (1877–1933) – founder, Missionary Society of St. Paul
- Saint George Preca (1880–1962) – canonized saint, Roman Catholic Church; founder, Society of Christian Doctrine
- Saint Publius (33–112) – first Bishop of Malta; martyr and saint.

== Scholars and academics ==
- Anthony Valletta (1908–1988) – lepidopterist and educationalist
- Arvid Pardo (1914–1999) – diplomat
- Dominic Pace (1851–1907) – theologian; philosopher
- Edward de Bono (1933–2021) – creator, lateral thinking
- Eric Scerri (born 1953) – author; historian; philosopher of chemistry; educator
- George Mifsud Chircop (1951–2007) – linguist
- Gorg Mallia (born 1957) – communications academic; author; cartoonist
- Henry Frendo (born 1948) – historian
- James J Busuttil (born 1958) – legal scholar
- Joe Friggieri (born 1946) – professor of philosophy; poet
- Joseph Aquilina (1911–1997) – author and linguist
- Joseph Baldacchino (1894–1974) – archaeologist
- Joseph Buttigieg (1947–2019) – literary scholar and translator
- Mikiel Anton Vassalli (1764–1829) – promoter, Maltese language; compiler, first Maltese dictionary
- Oliver Friggieri (born 1947) – poet; novelist; literary critic
- Peter Serracino Inglott (1936–2012) – Roman Catholic priest; philosopher; former rector, University of Malta
- Stephen C. Spiteri (born 1963) – military historian
- Suzanne Mizzi (1969–2011) – assistant principal, educator
- Themistocles Zammit (1864–1935) – archaeologist; historian
- Andrew B. Raupp (American entrepreneur and educator)

== Sports figures ==
- Aaron Falzon (born 1996) – basketball player
- Alex DeBrincat (born 1997) – ice hockey player
- André Schembri (born 1986) – football player
- Andrew Chetcuti (born 1992) – swimmer
- Anthony Zarb (1904-1993) – strongman
- Carlo Zammit Lonardelli (born 2001) - football player
- Carmel Busuttil (born 1964) – football player
- Charles Saliba (1929-1982) – strongman
- Charlie Magri (born 1956) – boxer
- Charlie Williams (born 1944) – football player (Malta and the United States)
- Christian Brown (born 1989) – amateur golfer & triathlete
- David Millar (born 1977) – racing cyclist
- Etienne Barbara (born 1982) – football player
- Francesca Vincenti (born 1965) – Windsurfing/Sailing/Hall of Fame
- Gilbert Agius (born 1974) – football player
- Jamie Carragher (born 1978) – football player of Maltese descent
- Jeff Fenech (born 1964) – boxer; former world champion
- Joe Cordina (born 1991) – Boxer and former IBF super-featherweight title champion
- Joe Falzon (strongman) (1932-2023) – strongman
- John Magri (born 1941) – cyclist; participated in two Olympics
- Kevin Muscat (born 1973) – former football player; head coach, Melbourne Victory FC
- Larry Attard (born 1951) – jockey; inductee, Canadian Horse Racing Hall of Fame
- Laurie Pace (born 1966) – judo player; bronze medalist, 1990 Commonwealth Games
- Luke Dimech (born 1977) – football player
- Mario Fenech (born 1961) – former rugby league footballer (South Sydney Rabbitohs)
- Michael Mifsud (born 1981) – football player
- Mikel Scicluna (1929–2010) – professional wrestler; inductee, WWE Hall of Fame
- Nino Schembri (born 1974) – martial artist
- Paul Grima (born 1950) – strongman
- Paul Tisdale (born 1973) – football coach
- Ray Farrugia (born 1955) – football coach
- Rebecca Madyson (born 1979) – sport shooter
- Samuel Deguara, (born 1991) – basketball player
- Sid C. Attard (born 1950) – thoroughbred-horse trainer in Canada
- Teddy Teuma (born 1993) – football player
- Tony Drago (born 1965) – snooker player
- Tony Farrugia – strongman
- Tony Tanti (born 1963) – ice-hockey player
- William Chetcuti (born 1985) – sport shooter
- Xandru Grech (born 1974) – athlete and coach

== Others ==
- Adelaide Conroy (1839–?) – photographer
- Alex Vella (born 1954) – businessman, boxer and outlaw motorcycle club leader
- Alfred Pisani – businessmen
- Andrea Ashworth (born 1969) – English author of Italian-Maltese descent
- Angelik Caruana – alleged Marian visionary
- Charlon Gouder – journalist
- Christopher Sutton-Mattocks (born 1951) – British-Maltese barrister, coroner and former first-class cricketer
- Grandayy (born 1994) – YouTuber, memer and music producer
- Joe Sacco (born 1960) – cartoonist
- Karin Grech (1962–1978) – letter bomb victim
- Massimo Ellul (born 1970) – businessman
- Maxim Gauci (1774–1854) – lithographer
- Mikiel'Ang Grima (1729–1798) – surgeon
- O. J. Borg (born 1979) – English radio and television personality of Maltese descent
- Paul Gauci (19th century) – lithographer of Maltese descent
- Peppi Azzopardi (born 1959) – television presenter
- Ruth Baldacchino – LGBT activist
- Suzanne Mizzi (1967–2011) – glamour model
- Tiffany Pisani (born 1992) – fashion model

== See also ==
- List of people on stamps of Malta
- Lists of people by nationality
