= Walter Micallef u l-Ħbieb =

Maltese musical band

- Origin: Malta
- Genres: Modern Folk
- Instrument(s): Vocals; Guitar; Harmonica; Accordion; Bass; Percussion
- Years active: 2004 – present
- Labels: Independent

Walter Micallef u l-Ħbieb is a modern folk sextet from Malta, featuring Walter Micallef on vocals and guitar, Renzo Spiteri on percussion, Jes Psaila on acoustic and electric guitar, Eric Wadge on bass, Pawlu Camilleri on harmonica and Albert Garzia on piano and accordion.

They have given many performances in Malta and on Gozo and all their songs are original and in Maltese, the European Union's smallest official language. On 23 March 2007 they launched the album Ħamsin, that topped the Maltese music charts on its release.
