= Spiteri =

Spiteri is a Maltese and southern Italian surname. The name originated as a shortening of the Sicilian surname Spitaleri from Catania, which itself came from the Norman French word hospitalier, meaning a hostel keeper. Similarly, it may also have been a shortening of the Greek Spiteris, from a derivative of the Latin word hospitarius, also meaning "hostel worker". In Malta, Spiteri is associated with the knights of the Hospitaller Malta, with folk stories attributing the name to the illegitimate children of the knights. However, the name Spiteri predates the arrival of the Knights Hospitaller in Malta, making this origin of the surname likely inaccurate. As of 2005, Spiteri is the tenth most popular surname in Malta, making up 1.8% of the total population of the country.

Notable people with the surname include:

- Amanda Spiteri Grech, Maltese politician
- Carm Lino Spiteri (1932–2008), Maltese architect and politician
- Charles Spiteri (1944–2025), Maltese footballer
- Curtis Spiteri (born 1981), American footballer
- Dalila Spiteri (born 1997), Italian tennis player
- Donat Spiteri (1922–2011), Maltese religious leader and author
- Emanuel Spiteri (1951/1952–1993), Maltese chef and murder victim
- Ernest Spiteri-Gonzi (born 1955), Maltese footballer
- Ioanna Spiteri (1920–2000), Greek Expressionist sculptor
- Jenise Spiteri (born 1992), Maltese-American snowboarder
- Jodie Spiteri, fictional character from the Australian television drama Wentworth
- Joe Spiteri (born 1973), Maltese-Australian footballer
- Joseph Spiteri (born 1959), Maltese prelate
- Joseph M. Spiteri (1934–2013), Maltese architect
- Kimberley Spiteri, American make-up artist
- Lino Spiteri (1938–2014), Maltese writer and politician
- Mary Spiteri (born 1947), Maltese cabaret artiste
- Michael Spiteri (born 1969), Maltese footballer
- Myriam Spiteri Debono (born 1952), Maltese politician
- Oliver Spiteri (born 1970), Maltese football manager and former player
- Renzo Spiteri, Maltese musician
- Sharleen Spiteri (born 1967), Scottish singer-songwriter; guitarist; lead vocalist of the pop-rock band Texas
- Sharleen Spiteri (sex worker) (died 2005), Australian sex worker
- Stephen C. Spiteri (born 1963), Maltese military historian
- Stephen Spiteri (politician), 21st-century Maltese politician
- Suzanne Spiteri (born 1978), Maltese sprinter
- Vicente Spiteri (1917–2003), Spanish conductor
