= List of people from Peterborough =

This is a list of people from Peterborough, in Cambridgeshire. This list may include people from Greater Peterborough, an area which includes a number of surrounding villages. This list is arranged alphabetically by surname:

== A ==
- George Alcock – astronomer who was one of the most successful visual discoverers of novas and comets.
- Annabelle Davis - British actress of The Dumping Ground and Hollyoaks fame, daughter of Warwick Davis

== B ==
- Andy Bell – lead singer of the English synth-pop duo Erasure
- David Bentley – former Tottenham Hotspur and England footballer.
- James Blades - percussionist
- Paul Blades – footballer who played as a defender for Derby County, Norwich City and Wolves.
- Peter Boizot – entrepreneur, restaurateur, politician, and philanthropist. Best known as the founder of PizzaExpress.

== C ==
- Roger Climpson - newscaster and television host
- Walter Cornelius - strongman who escaped Communist Lithuania by swimming the Baltic Sea
- John Clare - English poet

== D ==
- Joanna Dennehy, serial killer who murdered three men.

== E ==
- Jimmy Elliott – footballer who played for Tottenham and Brentford. Later worked as a football manager.

== F ==
- Gordon Fincham – former footballer who played for Leicester City, Plymouth Argyle and Luton Town.

== H ==
- Henry Hodge – English solicitor and Judge of the High Court of England and Wales.
- Jake Humphrey – Journalist and television presenter for BT Sport.

== J ==
- Julian Joachim – former football player for Leicester City, Aston Villa and Coventry City.

== L ==
- Adrian Lyne – film director

== M ==
- Aston Merrygold – singer-songwriter
- Maxim – musician

== O ==
- Matt Oakley – footballer who played for Southampton F.C. and Leicester City F.C.

== P ==
- William Paley - (1743-1805) - Anglican Clergyman; author.
- Luke Pasqualino - Actor. Starred in Our Girl and The Musketeers.

== R ==
- Henry Royce – founding partner in Rolls-Royce

== S ==
- Louis Smith, (born 1989) – British artistic gymnast who specialises in the pommel horse.
- William Speechly (1735–1819), horticulturist
- Luke Steele – footballer who plays in goal for Barnsley F.C.
- Michael Stonebank – DJ and electronic music producer known for releasing Hardcore music records

== T ==
- Jodie Turner-Smith, (born 1986) – Actress and model

== W ==
- Harry Wells, (born 1993) – rugby union player for Leicester Tigers

== Z ==
- Steve Zenchuk, (born 1966) – former professional footballer
