= Donat =

Donat is a masculine given name, which is also written as Donát. It is used as a first name extensively and to some extent, as a surname. It is derived from Latin "Donatus" past participle of "donare" meaning ‘to give’. The name was used by early Christians, either because the birth of a child was seen as a gift from God, or else because the child was in turn dedicated to God. Its origins are primarily East European ranging across Polish, Hungarian, Albanian, Slovak, Czech, German but it can be traced to French and English origins as well. The Spanish, Portugal and Italian variant is Donato.

The name was borne by early Christian saints – among them a 4th-century leader of a Christian sect, a 6th-century hermit of Sisteron and a 7th-century bishop of Besançon all of whom contributed to the popularity of the baptismal name in the Middle Ages. Another notable historical figure was Aelius Donatus, a grammarian and commentator on Virgil.

With no relation to the name whatsoever, Donatism was a centuries-old Christian sect which is no longer in effect. It may have gradually declined because Donatists and orthodox Catholics were equally marginalised by the Arian Vandals. It is unknown how long Donatism persisted.

In present day, the name is most popular among Hungarians who celebrate its Name Day on February 17.

== Notable people ==
- Camille Donat (born 1988), French triathlete
- Donat, Bishop of Dublin (died 1074), first bishop of Dublin
- Robert Donat (1905 – 1958), English actor, best remembered for his roles in Alfred Hitchcock's The 39 Steps (1935) and Goodbye, Mr. Chips (1939).
- Peter Donat (1928 – 2018), a Canadian-American actor, nephew of Robert
- Richard Donat (born 1941), a Canadian actor, known for his work in Canadian and American television, nephew of Robert
- Rosa Donat (born 1960), Spanish mathematician
- Jan Piwnik (1912–1944), Polish World War II soldier who used the nom de guerre Donat
- Donat O'Kennedy, a senior ecclesiastical officer within the Diocese of Killaloe.
- Donatus Magnus (250 – 355) also known as Donatus of Casae Nigrae, became leader of a schismatic sect known as the Donatists.
- St. Donatus (died 535), a Holy Hermit, born in Orléans, France and died in the Lure range, near Sisteron. His feast day is August 19.
- Donatus of Besançon (died after 658) was a bishop and founder of the monastery Palatium (later Saint-Paul).
- Aelius Donatus (flourished 4th century AD) was a Roman grammarian and teacher of rhetoric, who once taught Jerome.
- Gaius Junius Donatus (fl. mid-third century) was a Roman politician, twice appointed consul.
- Donat John, Count Heissler of Heitersheim (1648 – 1696).
- Donat Nonnotte (1708 – 1785) was a French painter who specialized in portraiture.
- Donat Henchy O'Brien (1785 – 1857), an Irish officer of the Royal Navy.
- Donát Bánki (1859 – 1922), a Hungarian mechanical engineer and inventor of Jewish heritage, noted for inventing the carburetor.
- Donat Raymond (1880 – 1963), was a Canadian Senator and builder in the National Hockey League.
- Donat R. Baribault (1885–1970) was an American architect.
- Donat Makijonek (1890 – 1941), a Russian Poruchik (The rank of lieutenant in Eastern Europe).
- Donat Kurti (1903–1983), was an Albanian franciscan friar, educator, scholar and folklorist who was born in (then) Ottoman Empire.
- Donat Yosifovich Kunle, editor of Fashist, a Russian fascist publication, issued from United States.
- Donat Spiteri (1922 – 2011), a lecturer and Professor of Biblical Studies at the Faculty of Theology at the University of Malta.
- Donat Cadruvi (1923 – 1998), a Swiss lawyer, politician and Romansh-language writer.
- Donat Savoie, a Canadian anthropologist and chief federal negotiator for Nunavik self-government before his retirement in 2006.
- Donat Wentzel (1934 – 2013), an American astrophysicist with Swiss origins.
- Donat Ertel (born 1948), a German bobsledder. He competed in the four man event at the 1972 Winter Olympics.
- Donat Acklin (born 1965), a Swiss bobsledder who competed in the late 1980s and early 1990s winning 7 medals.
- Donát Laczkovich (born 1991), a Hungarian footballer.
- Donat Dzhatiyev (born 1992), a Russian former professional football player.
- Donát Zsótér (born 1996), a Hungarian footballer.
- Donát Bartók (born 1996), a Hungarian handball player.
- Donát Szivacski (born 1997), a Hungarian footballer.
- Donat Rrudhani (born 1999), a Kosovan footballer who plays for Swiss club Lausanne-Sport and the Kosovo national team.
- Donát Bárány (born 2000), a Hungarian professional footballer.
- Donát Orosz (born 2002), a former Hungarian professional footballer.
- Lucas Donat (born 1962), an advertising executive, former actor, and the Chief Marketing Officer of Autonomy.
- János Donát (1744 – 1830) was a German-born Hungarian painter.
- Roosevelt Donat (born 1979), a prominent New Jersey Barrister and purveyor of donats.
- Patrick Brice (born 1983 and full name is Donat Patrick Kack-Brice), an American director.

== See also ==
- Donat, Switzerland, a municipality
- Donat of the Order of St John, contributor to its funds
- Saint-Donat, Lanaudière, Quebec
- Donat of the Order of Saint John
- St Donat's Church, St Donats
- St Donat's Castle
- Saint-Donat
- Donat Mg
