= Joe Falzon =

Joe Falzon may refer to:

- Joey Falzon, footballer and manager
- Joe Falzon (strongman)
