= Donath =

Donath may refer to:

- Ferenc Donáth (born 1954), Hungarian Olympic gymnast
- Fred A. Donath (born 1931), American geologist
- Gyula Donáth (1850–1909), Hungarian sculptor
- Helen Donath (born 1940), American soprano
- Judith Donath (born 1962), professor at MIT's Media Lab
- Ludwig Donath (1900–1967), Austrian-born US actor
- Ursula Donath (1931–2026), German athlete
- Donath, Switzerland, a former municipality now part of Donat, Switzerland

== See also ==
- Donat (disambiguation)
