= Charles Saliba =

Maltese strongman

- Charles "Ironman" Saliba

Personal information
- Nationality: Maltese
- Born: November 13, 1929; Sliema, Malta

Sport
- Sport: Strongman

Charles "Ironman" Saliba (1929–1982), was a performing oldtime strongman from the island of Malta who performed feats of strength shows during the 1960s, 1970s and early 1980s. Saliba was known as the "Ironman" or the "Man of Iron" and was also known as the strongest man in Europe.

== Early life ==
Charles Saliba was born in Sliema, Malta on 13 November 1929. Saliba was born into a large family consisting of eight siblings in total. In later years Saliba married Mary whom he had three children with.

== Training ==
During his younger years Saliba was interested in boxing and the martial arts. Saliba trained boxing at a boxing club in Manwel Dimech Street in Sliema, Malta. In later years Saliba would train mostly at home where he had a gym equipped with weightlifting and exercise equipment. Saliba's diet involved him consuming five cartons of eggs a week and a lot of horse meat. Saliba would later train the Maltese boxer Bertu Camilleri at the Youth Gym Sliema.

Saliba iron man of Malta G. C..

== Career ==
Saliba started his performing strongman career during the 1960s. At the beginning of his career Saliba began performing at a number of venues such as Radio City Theatre in Hamrun and at the Orpheum Theatre in Gzira. During some of his earlier performances Saliba would perform dangerous stunts as well as feats of strength. Some of Saliba's feats involved him bending steel objects with his hands and with his head, laying on a bed of nails for hours, laying on bed of sea urchins for hours, wrapping himself up in barbed wire etc. Saliba also performed with Walter Cornelius a Latvian strongman who performed feats of strength shows in the United Kingdom. In 1968 Saliba toured the United Kingdom with sifu Charles Gaffiero performing at public shows to raise money to buy a kidney machine for a hospital in Malta. Saliba was also known to perform feats such as using his mouth to hammer nails into wood and using his hair to lift heavy objects. Saliba would also perform the human sandwich stunt which involved him laying in between two beds of nails. Saliba was also known to have performed stone breaking stunts which involved someone usually a stone mason or builder smashing a stone with a sledge hammer on Saliba's body. Saliba also performed pulling feats in which he would pull heavy vehicles such as cars, trucks and buses. Saliba was also known to perform a feat in which he would pull a nail out of a plank of wood with his teeth. In one particular show Saliba had two cars drive over his arm. During most of his performances Saliba was assisted by his friend Leli Delia who was an acrobat from Bormla. In 1969 Saliba broke the record for laying on a bed of nails in which he manage to lay on for over eight hours breaking the previous record by Saxon Tylney. In 1970 Saliba once again travelled to the United Kingdom to perform on a televised appearance on the BBC. During this performance Saliba bent a number of steel objects and broke a number of other records. Also during 1970 Saliba performed a dangerous stunt which involved him in laying between two beds of nails with a car full of people resting on top of these. In one of Saliba's most impressive performances he managed to pull a Boeing 727 airliner belonging to Air Malta to help raise money for charity. Saliba was also known for performing the human link feat with horses and people attempting to break his grip by pulling him from both sides with ropes attached to each of Saliba's arms. In his later years Saliba began performing Indian style feats and stunts which involved him pulling heavy vehicles using metal piercings through his mouth and face. Saliba would also perform in the circus and on Australian television after moving to Australia during the 1970s. During this period Saliba also performed as a stuntman. In one particular stunt during the 1970s Saliba managed to pull a heavy cannon. Saliba also performed in Singapore during this period. After returning to Malta one of Saliba's final performances involved him pulling a car with his hair from Saint Julian's to Sliema.

Saliba pulling Boeing 727 airliner in 1970.

== Death ==
Saliba died on 19 July 1982 at the age of 53 while attending a record breaking show by open water endurance swimmer Alfred Kitcher.
