= Peterborough Lido =

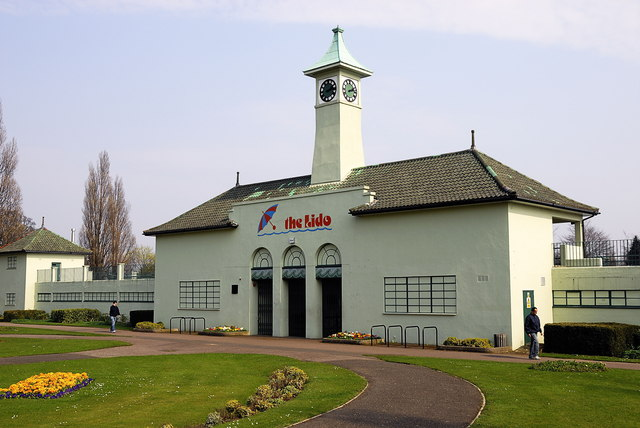

General information
- Type: Open air swimming pool
- Architectural style: Art Deco
- Location: Bishops Road, TL1 9NE, Peterborough, England
- Coordinates: 52.5700°N 0.2387°W
- Opened: 25 May 1936

Website
- Official website

Listed Building – Grade II
- Official name: The Lido
- Designated: 27 July 1992
- Reference no.: 1126896

The Lido in the city of Peterborough, Cambridgeshire was first opened as the Corporation Swimming Pool in 1936 by the Mayor of Peterborough Arthur Mellows, and is one of the few survivors of its type still in use in the United Kingdom. A striking building with elements of art deco design, the Lido and surrounding gardens cover an area of roughly two and a half acres (1 hectare), lying adjacent to the embankment of the River Nene, south of the city centre. Designed in the "hacienda style", it is considered one of the finest surviving examples in England.

== History ==
The land on which the swimming pool is situated was purchased by the corporation from the Ecclesiastical Commissioners in 1927. The pool opened on 28 May 1936.

In 2016, the Lido erected a silhouette of Walter Cornelius as a weathercock on the swimming pool's weather vane.

The pool faced closure in 2024, when Peterborough City Council considered mothballing it to save annual running costs of £400,000, but the council decided against this. In 2026, the pool had a post-Covid record of 60,000 users.

== Facilities ==
The main pool is 8 feet 10 inches (2.69 m) deep at the deep end sloping to 2 feet 11 inches (0.89 m) at the shallow end and holds 500,000 gallons (2,273 m^{3}) of water. The site, which also includes two other heated outdoor pools (learner and paddling), a large sunbathing lawn, balcony and refreshment area was designated a Grade II listed building in 1992. It is open to the public from late May to early September, closing during periods of inclement weather.

Peterborough Sub-Aqua Club are official tenants of the Lido, renting some of the rooms beneath the clock tower.
