= Tony Farrugia =

Maltese strongman

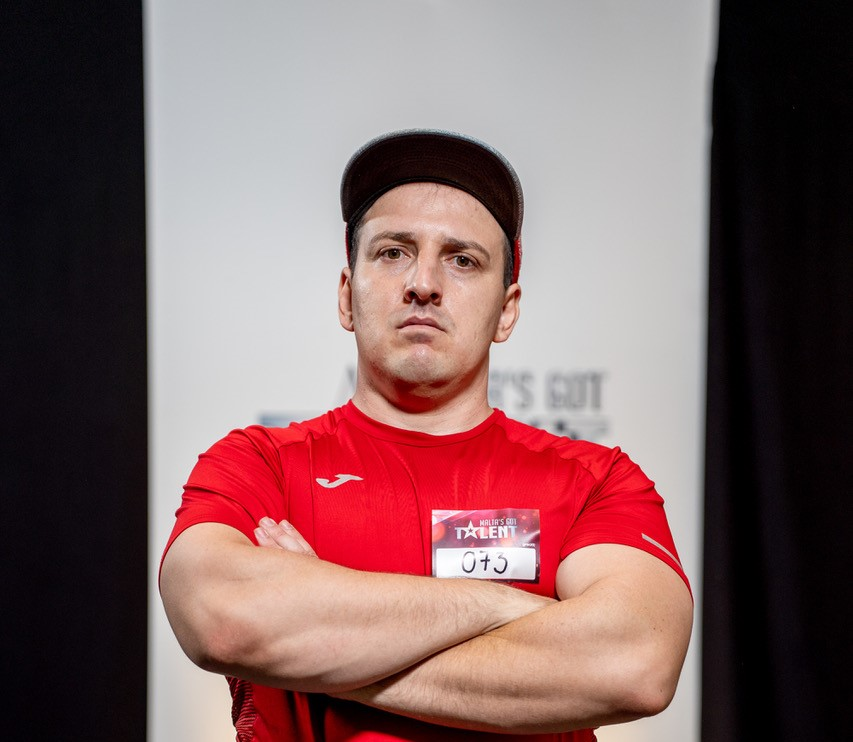
- Tony "The Strongman" Farrugia

Personal information
- Nationality: Maltese

Sport
- Sport: Strongman

Tony "The Strongman" Farrugia, is a performing oldtime strongman from the isle of Malta who performed feats of strength shows during the 2010s and 2020s. Farrugia is known as "The Strongman" and is also known as the strongest man in Malta.

== Training ==
During his younger years Farrugia was interested in stone lifting and strongman. Farrugia started stone lifting at an early age after being inspired by stories of his grandfather who was a renowned stone lifter in Malta. In later years Farrugia trained himself as an oldtime performing strongman for him to be able to perform feats of strength shows.

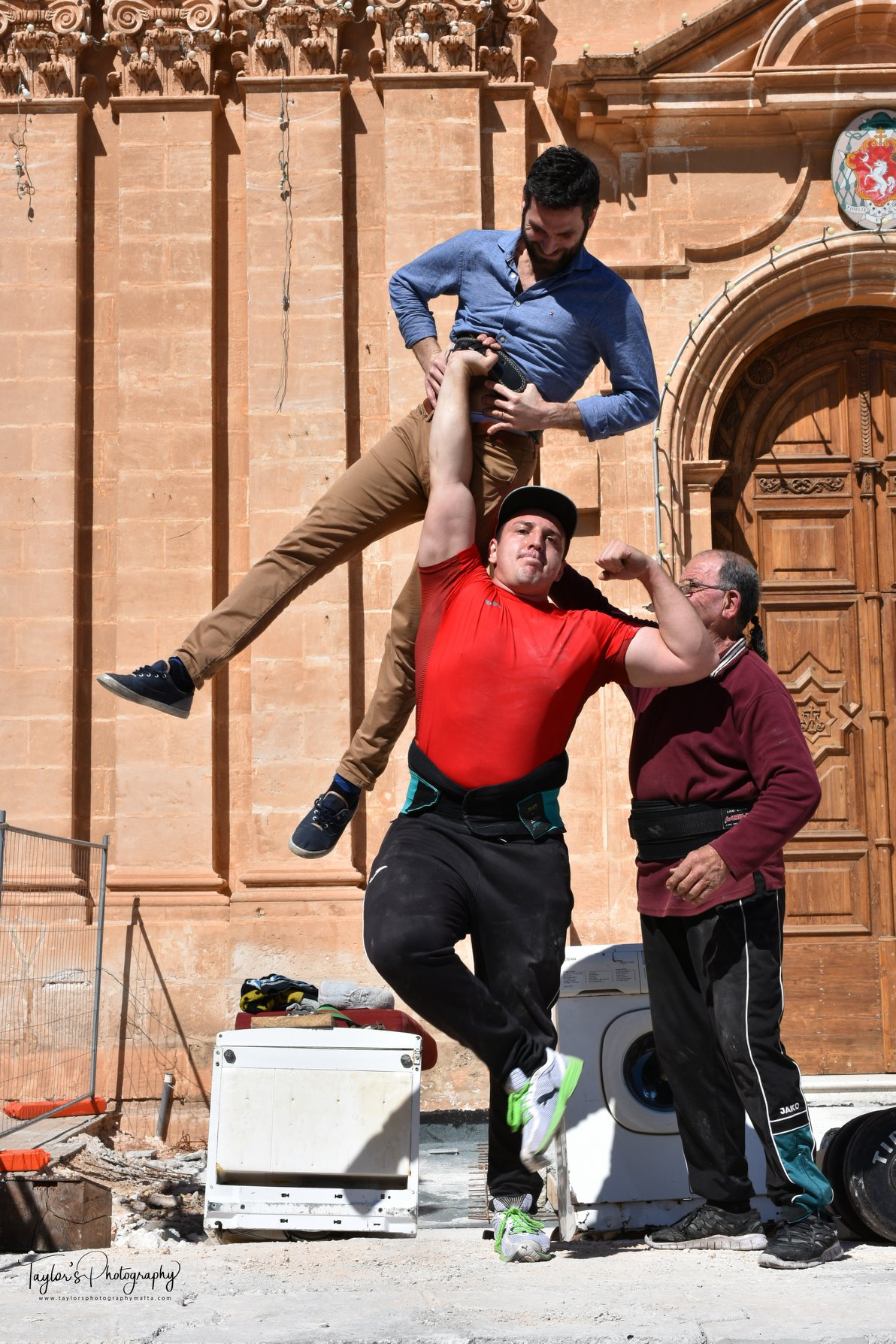
Maltese strongman Tony Farrugia performing his human dumbbell feat during a performance in Mellieha, Malta.

== Career ==
Farrugia started his performing strongman career during the 2010s. At the beginning of his career Farrugia began performing at a number of outdoor venues around Malta and Gozo, usually at truck shows and car shows. From the beginning of his strongman career Farrugia dedicated his shows to charitable causes. During his performances Farrugia performs a variety of feats, which mainly involve feats of strength. Some of Farrugia's feats involve him lifting cars and pulling heavy vehicles including trucks and buses and lifting large iron skips. Other feats performed by Farrugia involve him bending steel objects, ripping telephone directories and decks of cards in half and lifting gas cylinders with his pinky fingers. In 2016 Farrugia teamed up with a veteran performing strongman called Paul "Mr. Cool" Grima, together they created the strongman team called 'Tony & Cool'. In 2022 Farrugia performed on episode 2 of the second season of Malta's Got Talent where he received four yeses from the judges. Farrugia then appeared on episode 7, the judges deliberation phase, where he then qualified for the live semi-final phase. Farrugia performed in the semi-final but failed to reach the final after being eliminated during the televoting phase.

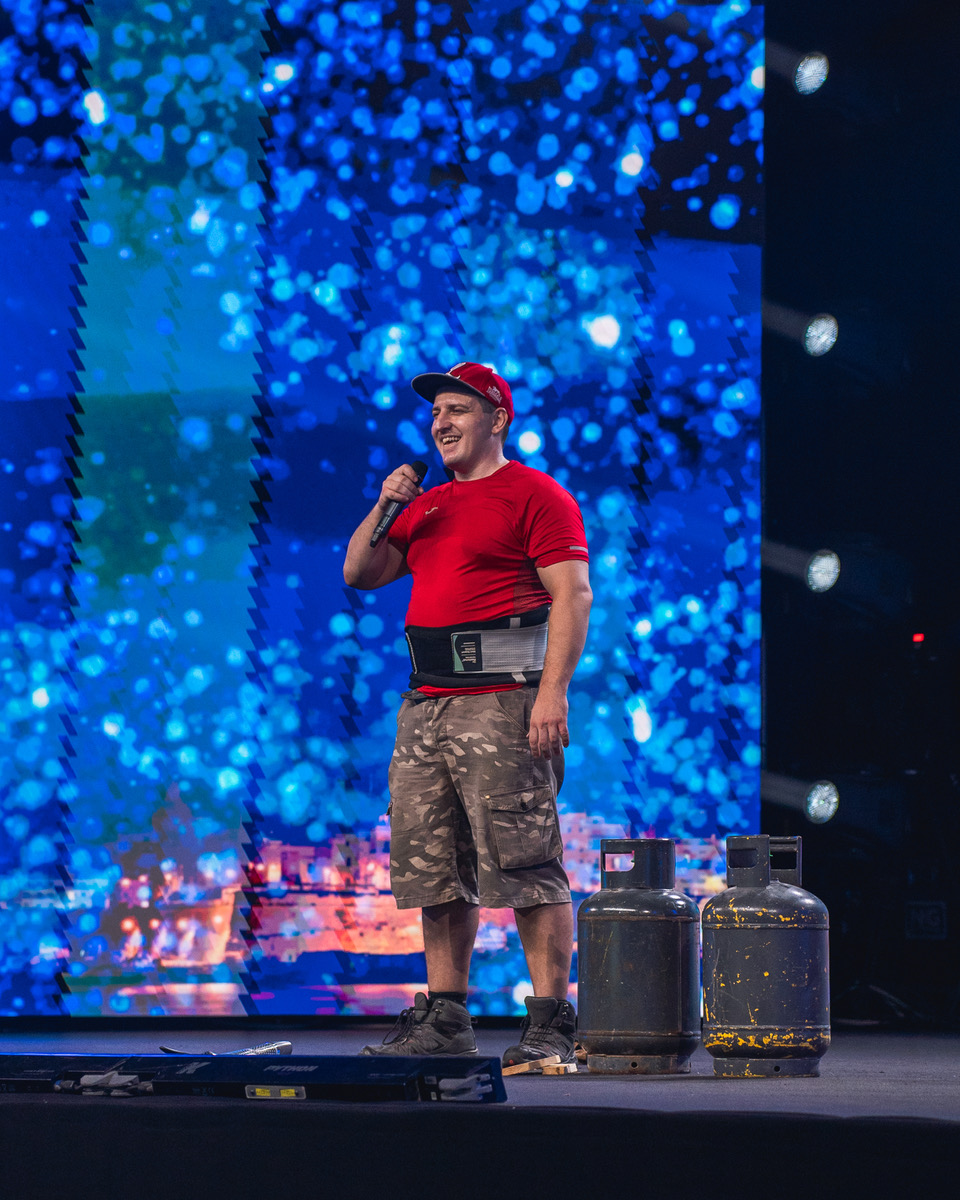
Maltese strongman Tony Farrugia on the Got Talent stage during Season 2 of Malta's Got Talent.
