= Dominic Pace =

Maltese theologian and philosopher (1851–1907)

- Born: December 17, 1851; Vittoriosa, Malta
- Died: June 29, 1907 (aged 55); Vittoriosa, Malta
- Occupation: Philosophy

Dominic Pace (1851–1907) was a Maltese theologian and philosopher. In philosophy, he mostly specialised in Aristotelico-Thomist Scholasticism.

== Life ==
Pace was born at Vittoriosa, Malta, on December 17, 1851. He joined the Dominicans in 1867 at almost 16 years of age. He accomplished his institutional studies in philosophy with the Dominicans at Rabat, Malta, and his theological ones with the Dominicans at Vittoriosa. Due to the colera epidemic which hit the Maltese islands in those days, Pace was sent to Florence, Italy, at the convent of Saint Maximin, to pursue his theological studies there. In 1874 he acquired his colour in philosophy and theology.

Back in Malta, Pace was ordained a priest, and chosen as the Master of Dominican Students at Rabat, Malta. Here, from 1874 onwards, he also taught philosophy at the Dominican Studium Generale. In recognition of his publication Difesa della Dottrina di S. Tommaso d’Aquino in 1877, Pace was made member of the Philosophical-Medical Academy of Bologna, Italy. Later, he was also awarded the title General Preacher by the Order of Preachers in Rome, Italy.

Pace died at Vittoriosa on June 29, 1907. Though his funeral was held at Vittoriosa, he was buried within the church of the Dominicans at Rabat, Malta.

== Work ==
Pace's only extant work, Difesa della Dottrina di S. Tommaso d’Aquino (A Defence of the Doctrine of St. Thomas Aquinas), published in 1877 (Tipografia E. Laferla, Malta), was composed as a response to a book published by a priest, Francis Reale, in 1873 in which, while discussing the Bible, he attributed to Aquinas certain theories considered erroneous by Pace. Reale went so far to suggest that Aquinas was a heretic.

Since Reale also proposed that most Dominicans do not agree with Aquinas’ doctrine on humans’ natural disposition to know God, Pace counters such a proposition. Accordingly, his pamphlet, which is made up of just 25 pages, deals mainly with humans’ natural knowledge of God, and the natural disposition of pagans to believe in Jesus Christ. Of course, the source of Pace's teachings is Aquinas himself. Nevertheless, many biblical references and citations are included too. Pace philosophically maintains that Aquinas is correct in what he teaches, and that all Dominicans subscribed to his point of view.

Understanably, the Difesa is a polemical work. Though Pace recognises that philosophy should have no authority except reason, he submits that Aquinas is a clear and authoritative reflection enough of natural reason.

== See also ==
- Philosophy in Malta

== Sources ==
- Mark Montebello, Il-Ktieb tal-Filosofija f’Malta (A Source Book of Philosophy in Malta), PIN Publications, Malta, 2001.
