= John Peter Portelli =

Maltese writer (born 1954)

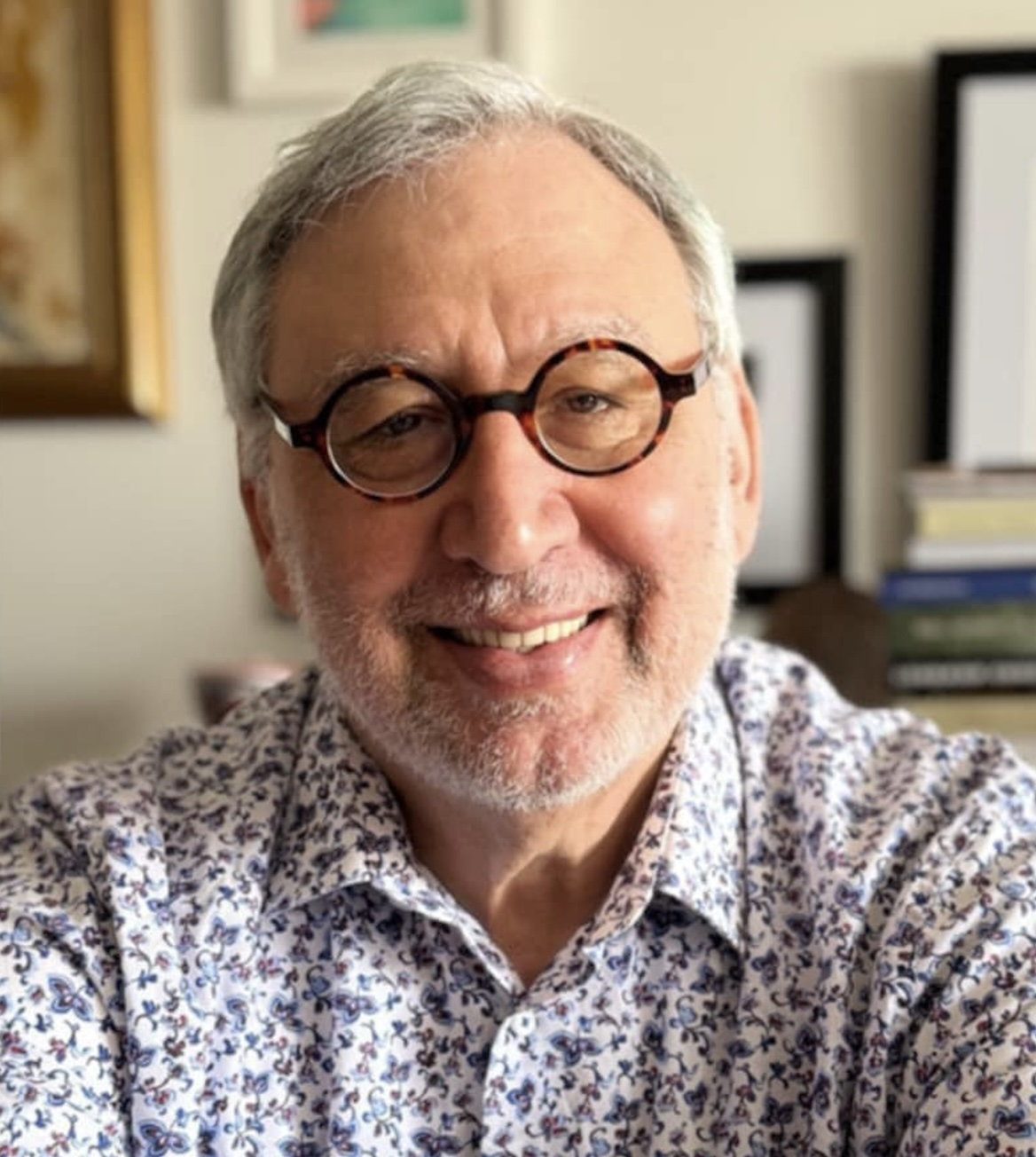
- Born: 21 March 1954 (age 72); Mosta, Malta
- Education: McGill University
- Occupations: Professor and author
- Employer: University of Toronto
- Website: https://www.johnpportelli.com

John Peter Portelli (born 21 March 1954) is a professor emeritus, poet and fiction writer from Malta who resides in Toronto, Canada, and Malta.

== Life ==
John P. Portelli was born in Malta where, after completing a B.A. (Philosophy & Maltese, 1975), and a B.A. (hons. in Philosophy, 1976) he taught history and modern languages at a secondary school and philosophy at a sixth form. In 1977 he was awarded a Commonwealth Scholarship and commenced his studies at McGill University from where he obtained an M.A. (1979) and a Ph.D. (1984) in Philosophy. Currently he is a professor emeritus in the Department of Social Justice Education, and the Department of Leadership, Higher and Adult Education at OISE, University of Toronto. He is a member of the Centre for Leadership and Diversity and a fellow a St. Michael's College, University of Toronto.

Before joining OISE in 1999 as a full professor he taught in several universities: The University of Malta (1980), College Marie Victorin (1981-1985), McGill University (1982-1985), Dalhousie University (Killam Post-Doctoral Fellow, 1985-1986), Mount Saint Vincent University (1986 – 1999). He was a visiting professor at the University of Malta (1992), Acadia University (1997), the University of British Columbia (1998), and the University of Verona (2010, 2011).

He has published 41 books including 11 academic books, several poetry collections, two collections of short stories, and two novels. He has also published over 100 articles and chapters in books and delivered more than 100 presentations at national and international conferences. Two of his books won the American Educational Studies Association Critic Award, and another of his books won the Canadian Association for the Foundations of Education Book Award.

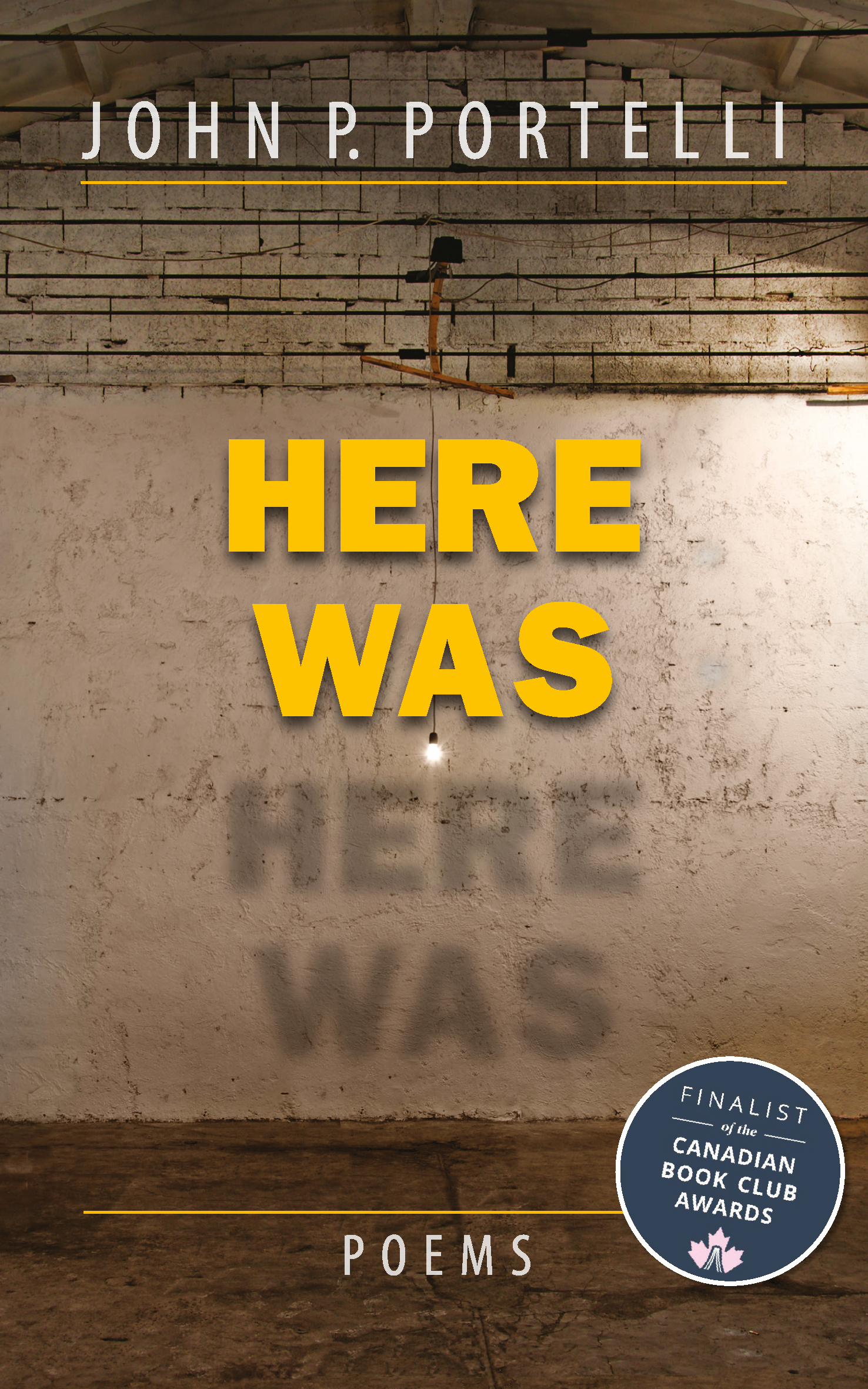
Here Was

His research includes theoretical and empirical studies. He has led several national research projects in Canada and elsewhere. In total he has been awarded $1.4 million for research projects.

In 2005 he received the Canadian Society for the Study of Education Mentorship Award. In March 2013 he was awarded the David E. Hunt Graduate Teaching Award at the University of Toronto.

Since 1982 he has worked closely with teachers and school administrators in Canada and internationally. He has been a member of the Board of the National Commission for Higher Education of Malta (2006-2017) and Chair of the Board in 2022, a Lead Expert for the European Mediterranean University, Slovenia (on issues of quality assurance), Chair of the Quality Assurance Committee for Further and Higher Education in Malta (2014-2018) and a regular member of the same Committee(until 2022), and a senior policy advisor to the Ministry of Education and Employment in Malta (2007-2022). He has carried out Quality Assurance work in several countries including Malta, Slovenia, Turkey, Bahrain and Saudi Arabia.

== Literary Works ==
Although Portelli started writing in his youth and published poetry and essays in literary journals in Malta, his first collection of poetry was published in 2001: Bejn Żewġ Dinjiet/In Between (Toronto). Since then, he has published several collections both in Maltese and bilingual collections. He also published two novels Everyone but Faiza, and Mob University, and two collections of short stories. His writing has been described as critical realist and minimalist in style. His work focuses on themes of social justice, migration, and existential everyday occurrences. His latest poetry publications include: Here Was (2023), Vojta l-Bajja/Barren is the Bay (2023), The Shadow: Poems for the Children of Palestine (co-authored with Ahmed Miqdad), 2024; Meta Tasal, Tasal (a collection of poems in Maltese), 2024, an edited collection Unsilenced: Poems for Palestine (50 international contributors), 2025, La Darba Tinsa/Once I Forget (2025), and The Lost Coyote (2026).

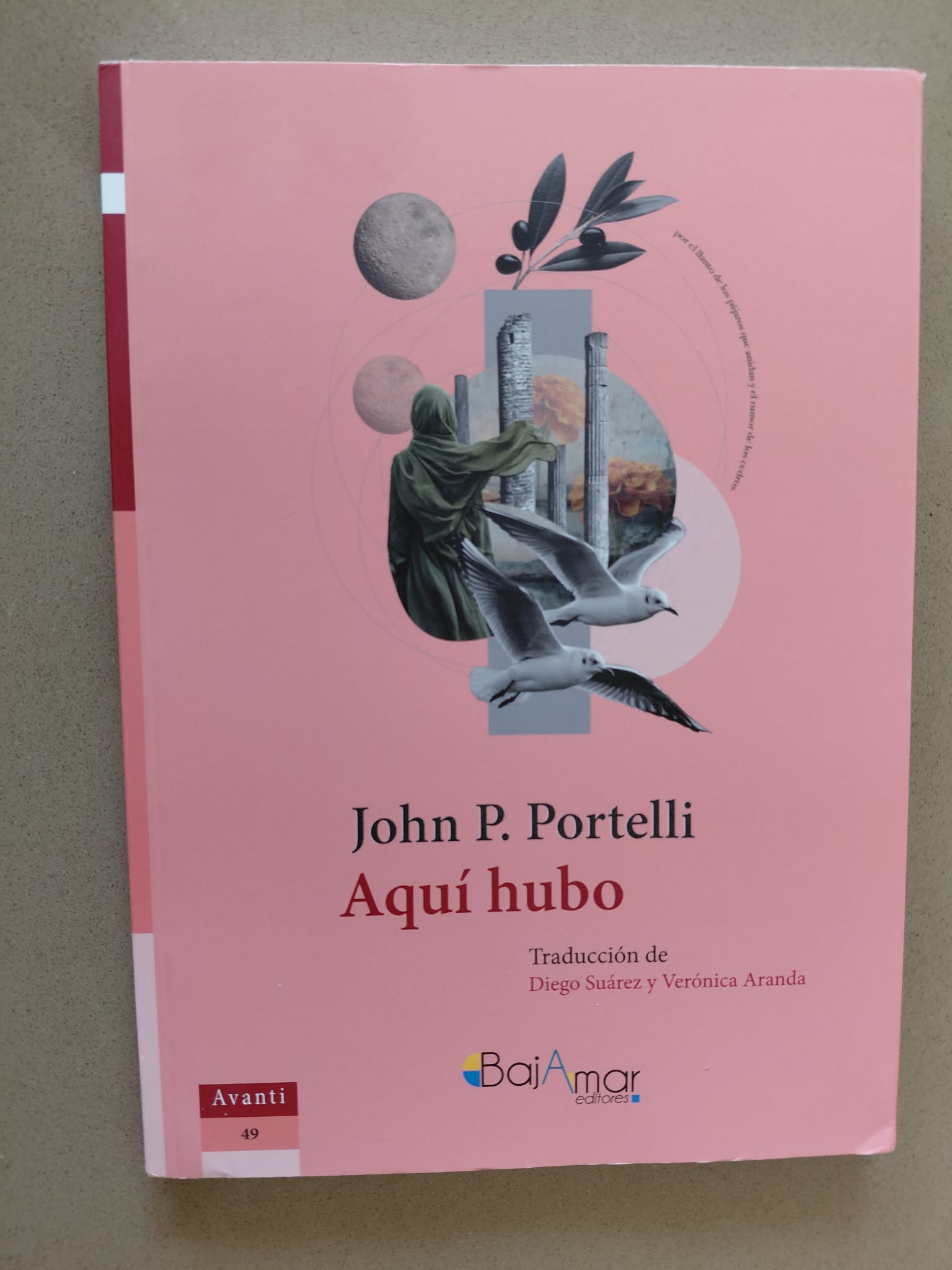
Aqui Hubo

His work has been translated and published in Spanish, Italian, Romanian, Arabic, Greek, Turkish, Persian, Polish, Ukrainian, Korean, and French.

=== Literary Publications ===
- L-Universita’ Mafja/ Mob University (novel). Malta: Horizons, 2026
- The Lost Coyote: Poems. Cairo, Egypt: Sulfur Editions, and Malta: Horizons, 2026
- La Darba Ninsa: Poeżiji. Malta:Horizons, 2026
- Once I Forget: Poems. Malta: Horizons and Quebec, Canada: Daraja Press, 2025
- Unsilenced: Poems for Palestine (a collection of poems on Palestine by 50 international authors), editor. Malta Horizons, and Quebec, CA: Daraja Press, May 2025.
- Meta tasal, tasal (a collection of 46 poems in Maltese). Malta: Horizons, 2024.
- The Shadow: Poems for the Children of Gaza (a collection of 44 poems) with Ahmed Miqdad. Malta Horizons, and Quebec, CA: Daraja Press, July 2024.
- Buradagdi (Turkish translation of Here Was). Istanbul, Turkiye: Fabrik Kitap, June 2024.
- Il-Ħsad tal-Peprin (a collection of poems in Maltese by 40 authors on Gaza), co-edited with David Aloisio. Malta: Horizons, May 2024.
- Exiled Words (a collection of poems translated into Persian). Tehran, Iran: Ashk Publication, 2024
- Questo Mare (a collection of 74 poems in Italian). Roma, Italia: Albatros, February 2024.
- Hanna Kanat (Arabic translation of Here Was). Tunis, Tunisia: Fardous Publishing House, November 2023.
- Vojta l-Bajja/Barren is the Bay (a collection of 64 poems in Maltese with English translation by Professor john Baldacchino). Malta: Horizons, October 2023.
- Aici Candva (translation of Here Was into Romanian). Romania: Rochart, 2023.
- Here Was (a collection of 80 poems translated into English). Malta: Horizons and Canada: Word & Deed, 2023.
- Bejn il-Binarji (a collection of 40 poems in Maltese). Malta: Horizons, 2022. Short-listed for the Malta Book Council Literary Prize, 2022.
- Dar-Riħ Malizzjuż (a collection of 43 poems in Maltese). Malta: Horizons, 2021.
- Everyone but Fajza (novel). Burlington, ON: Word & Deed, and Malta: Horizons, 2021.
- Tgħanniq Ieħor (ed. With K. Azzopardi and S. Inguanez, collection of contemporary Maltese poetry). Malta: Horizons, 2021. Short-listed for the Malta Book Council Literary Prize, 2021.
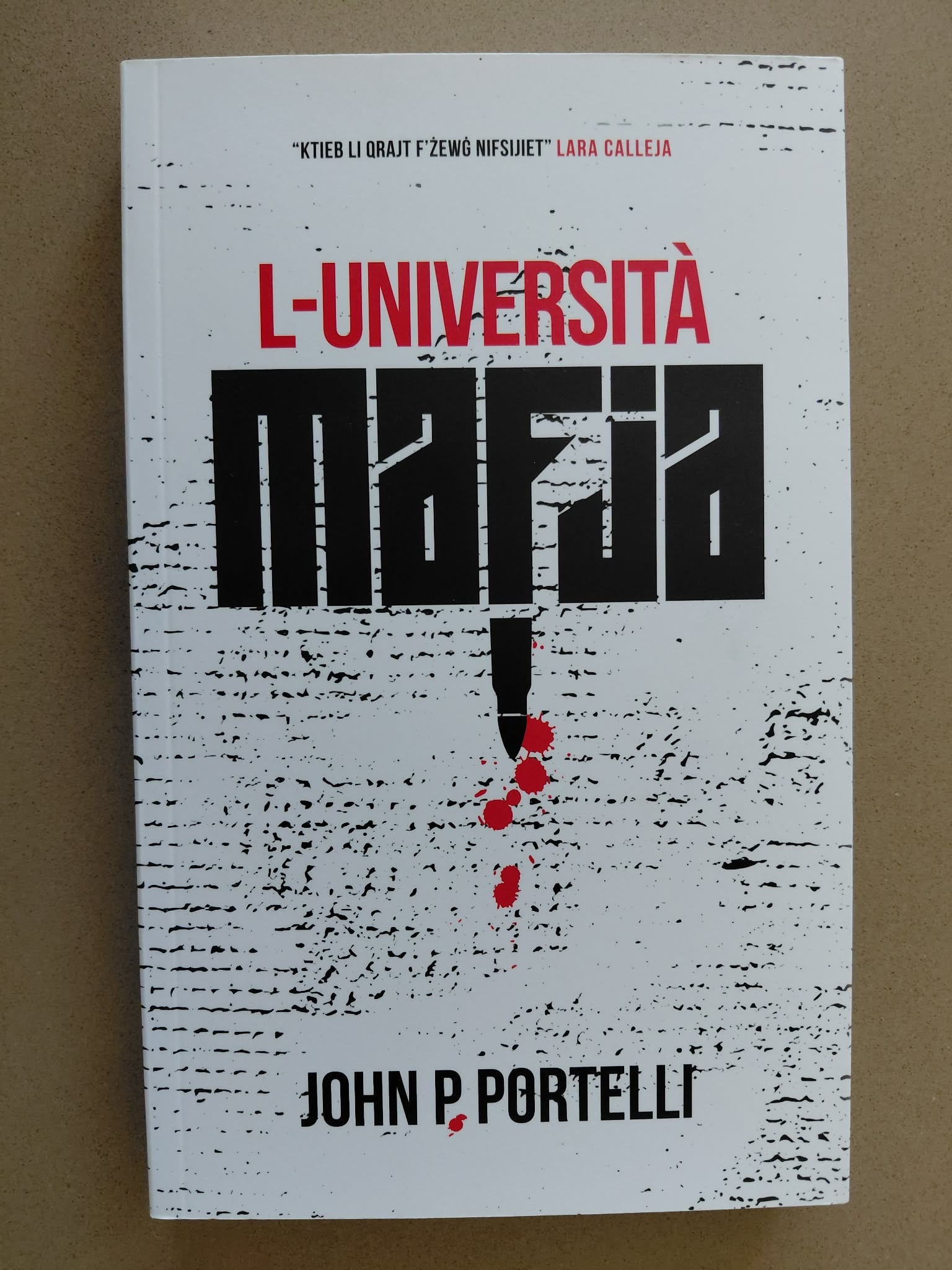
- L-Universita’ Mafja
  Emkien għall-kenn (poetry). Malta: Horizons, 2020. Short-listed for the Malta Book Council Literary Prize, 2018.
- The Lives of Yesterday. A collection of 40 poems translated into Greek. Athens, Greece: Oropodio, 2020.
- L-Ittra ta’ Osama u Stejjer Oħra (Osama's Letter and Other Short Stories). Malta: Horizons, 2019.
- Everyday Encounters: Short Stories. Burlington, ON: Word and Deed Publ., 2019.
- Kulħadd barra Fajża (novel). Malta: Horizons, 2019. Short-listed for the Malta Book Council Literary Prize, 2019.
- Inkontri ta’ Kuljum: Skizzi (Daily Encounters: Short Stories). Malta: Horizons, 2018. A collection of 55 existential short stories in Maltese. Short-listed for the Malta Book Council Literary Prize, 2018.
- Migrant Desires/Xewqat tal-Passa ( a collection of 60 poems in Maltese and English translations). Malta: Horizons, 2017. Placed second for the Malta Poetry National Award for 2017.
- Luggage/Bagage (a collection of 33 poems in English with French translations). Burlington, ON: Word & Deed, 2016.
- Taħt iċ-Ċirasa/Under the Cherry Tree. Collection of 37 poems and 100 haiku in Maltese with English translations. Malta: PEG Publishers, 2008.
- Bejn Zewg Dinjiet: Malta u l-Kanada/In Between: Malta and Canada (Collection of poems in Maltese and the English translation. Toronto: Melita Books 2003.

== Works ==
=== Academic Books ===
- Confronting Educational Policy in Neoliberal Times: International Perspectives. New York: Routledge, 2019. (With Stephanie Chitpin). · Key Questions for Educational Leaders. Burlington, ON: Word & Deed Publ. and Edphil Books, 2015. (with Darrin Griffiths).
- Philosophy of Education: Introductory Readings. Edmonton: Brush Books, 4th. revised edition, November 2013. (With William Hare).
- Student Engagement in Urban Schools: Beyond Neoliberal Discourses. North Carolina: Information Age Publishers, 2012. (With Brenda McMahon).
- Leading for Equity: The Investing in Diversity Approach. Toronto, ON: Edphil Books, 2009. (With Rosemary Campbell-Stephens).
- Journal of Thought (U.S.A.). Special issue on “Critical Democracy and Educational Leadership Issues: Philosophical Responses to the Neoliberal Agenda, “ 42,1, 2007.
- Key Questions in Education (U.S. edition). San Francisco, CA: Caddo Gap Press, 2007. (Won the AESA Critics' Choice Award in 2008). With William Hare.
- Key Questions in Education. Halifax, NS: Edphil Books, November 2005. With William Hare.
- The McGill Journal of Education, 38, 2, Spring 2003, 151pp. Special issue on “The Challenge of Student Engagement: Beyond Mainstream Conceptions and Practices”. With Lynn Butler-Kisber.
- What To Do? Case Studies for Educators. Halifax: Edphil Books, 3rd. revised edition, 2003. With William Hare.
- Journal of Thought (U.S.A.), 37, 1, Spring 2002, 96pp. Special issue on “Ethics and Educational Leadership.” With Douglas Simpson.
- Philosophy of Education: Introductory Readings. Calgary: Detselig Ent. Ltd., 3rd. revised edition, 2001. With William Hare.

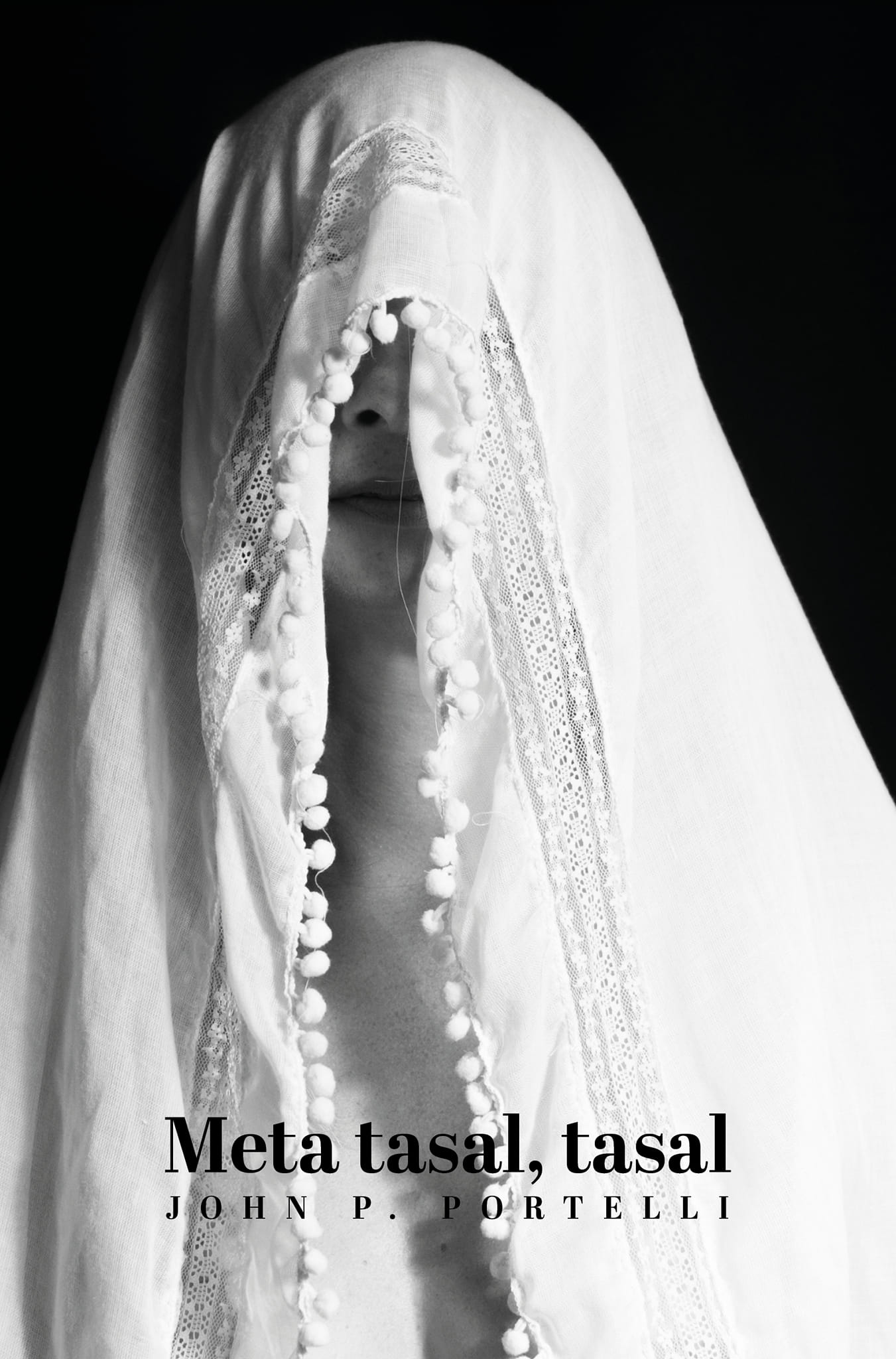
Barren Is The Bay

- The Erosion of the Democratic Tradition in Education: From Critique to Possibility. Calgary: Detselig Ent. Ltd., 2001. (Won the AESA Critics’ Choice Award in 2001). With Patrick Solomon.
- What To Do? Case Studies for Teachers. Halifax: Edphil Books, 2nd. revised edition, 1998. With William Hare.
- Philosophy of Education: Introductory Readings. Calgary: Detselig Ent. Ltd., 2nd. revised edition, Fall 1996. (Won the CAFÉ Book Award in 1998). With William Hare. Translated into Persian by Saeed Beheshti (2004).
- Children, Philosophy, and Democracy. Calgary: Detselig Ent. Ltd., 1995. (Won the AESA Critics' Choice Award in 1997). With Ronald Reed.
- What To Do? Case Studies for Teachers. Halifax: Fairmount Books, 1993. With William Hare.
- Reason and Value in Education: New Perspectives in Philosophy of Education. Calgary: Detselig Ent. Ltd., 1993. With Sharon Bailin.
- Philosophy of Education: Introductory Readings. Calgary: Detselig Ent. Ltd., December 1988. With William Hare.

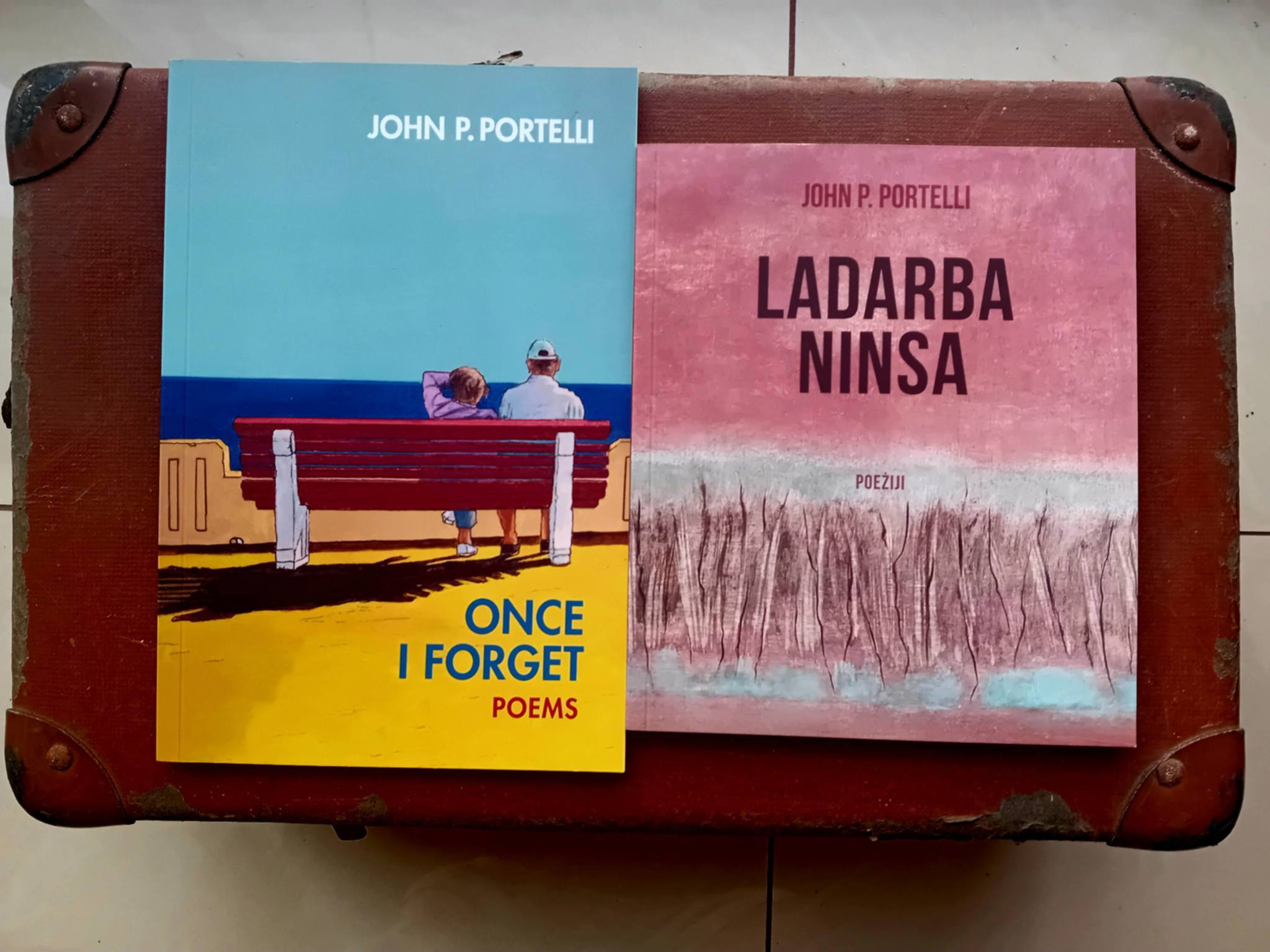
Once I Forget
