= Walter Micallef =

- Birth name: Walter Micallef
- Born: 24 October 1955 (age 69)
- Origin: Birkirkara, Malta
- Genres: Modern folk
- Occupation(s): Singer-songwriter, guitarist
- Instrument(s): Vocals; Guitar
- Years active: 1973 – present
- Labels: Independent
- Website: Walter Micallef official website

Walter Micallef (born 24 October 1955) is a Maltese singer songwriter, born in the central Maltese town of Birkirkara. He has composed well over a hundred songs in Maltese.

== Childhood ==
He spent his childhood in Birkirkara when his family home was requisitioned by the state to build a public convenience. Three of his earlier songs, all still unreleased, are "Ġewwa Marsalforn" (In Marsalforn), "Erġajt Sejjer Marsalforn" ("Going back to Marsalforn") and "Xagħar Iswed" ("Black Hair"). The first two are both played on the reggae beat and have only been performed in Valletta in 2004 and in Xewkija, Gozo in 2005. The track Xagħar Iswed, was written when Micallef was seventeen years old. A literal translation of a stanza taken from Xagħar Iswed, written in 1972, goes as:

Black and wavy hair, beautiful lips, mellow smile, it's our love that I seek, I admire her and she knows all this.

== Musical Influences ==
He has cited the Italian Giorgio Gaber, Gino Paoli and American Jim Croce and James Taylor as his major musical influences. Graziana Axisa has played as a supporting act in a major Marsaskala concert in 2006. Axisa has sung Micallef's song, "Għaċ-Ċkejkna" in the 2005 Għanja Tal-Poplu festival, placing a creditable second.

== Musical career ==
Micallef has won the major Maltese artistic awards. He has won the Għanja tal-Poplu festival, founded by the Youth Travel Circle in 1973, several times. In 1979, he won with "Ġuvni" ("Young Man"), followed with success in 1992 with "Iż-Żmien" ("Time") and in 1994 with "In-Nofsinhar" (The South). He won best lyrics in 1994 with "Le" ("No"), in 1999 with "Sieħbi fil-Cupboard tal-Kċina" ("My friend in the Cupboard"), in 2005 with "Għaċ-Ċkejkna" ("For the Little One"), and in 2006 with "Lil Malta" ("A Song for Malta").

Writing in Malta Today on 23 March 2001, critic Miriam Dunn remarked that "listening to the intelligent usage he makes of the Maltese language in his work, it is difficult to imagine that some years back, he decided to switch his songwriting from the English language". Although he had been around since 1973, it was in February 2003 that he released his first album, entitled M'Jien Xejn (I am Nothing), and it contains fifteen tracks written between 1981 and 2001. "Awwissu" ("August") is the most popular track from this album.

On 18 March 2004, he launched his Walter Micallef u l-Ħbieb band, including Etnika's double bassist Oliver DeGabriele, as Malta's representative in the UNESCO Suisse charity event One World Beat . This was followed by four concerts in July 2004 at the St. James Cavalier Arts Centre in Valletta, featuring his current sextet. He made appearances on German television stations ZDF and Bayerisches Fernsehen, as well as several regional French stations. Micallef was shortlisted for Best Male Artist in 2004 for the Malta Music Awards, and has continued to win acclaim and awards for his lyrics. He received the Julian Manduca Cultural Award in July 2006 for his proactive environmental songs, aimed at raising social consciousness.

Walter Micallef u l-Ħbieb 'Live at the Powerhouse', Floriana 23 March 2007

.

On 23 March 2007, he released his second album, Ħamsin (Fifty) to a packed house at the Powerhouse Theatre , Valletta Waterfront in Floriana. His modern folk sextet includes WOMAD performer Renzo Spiteri on percussion, Eric Wadge on bass, Pawlu Camilleri 'l-Bibi' on harmonica, Albert Garzia on accordion and piano, and Jes Psaila on acoustic, semi-acoustic and electric guitars. Ħamsin includes twelve tracks, with thematic content ranging from romantic songs such as "Wara l-Ħajt" (Behind the Wall) and "Min Hi?" (Who is She?) to pro-environmental songs like "L-Aħħar Sekondi" (The Final Seconds) and "Lil Malta" ("A Song for Malta"). On 6 May 2007 the album was at the top of the D'Amato Music Best 20 Malta hit parade.

== Songs ==
- "Willie" (1970)
- "Xagħar Iswed" (1972)
- "Ma tħobbnix"
- "Lil Hilary"
- "Simpatija u Ħniena"
- "Ħmistax"
- "Ġewwa Marsalforn"
- "Inħobbok" (1974)
- "5 t'Ottubru 1977" (1977)
- "Ħrafa u Ereżija" (1978)
- "Ġuvni" (1979)
- "Ġebla Niexfa"
- "L-istorja ta' Dej"
- "Mqar"
- "Il-party"
- "Inċedi"
- "Inħobbok" (oħra)
- "Ma Temminnix" (1980)
- "In-Nofsinhar" (1981)
- "Lil Dil-Povra Kreatura" (1982)
- "M'Jien Xejn" (1988)
- "L-Aħħar Sekondi"
- "Iż-Żmien" (1993)
- "Le" (1994)
- "Tihom Widen" (1995)
- "Awwissu" (1996)
- "Blues" (1997)
- "L-F.M."
- "Dan l-Aħħar" (1998)
- "Kif Deherli Jien"
- "Gianni" (1999)
- "Żgħira"
- "Sieħbi fil-Cupboard tal-Kċina"
- "San Blas waqt il-Programm" (2000)
- "Nemmen"
- "Elfejn u Għoxrin" (2001)
- "Il-Kejl"
- "Wara l-Ħajt" (2002)
- "Kelba, qattusa u kanarin"
- "Ħajja tan-Nejk"
- "Ċirku"
- "Il-Fjamma"
- "Ċanfira"
- "Ħażin" (2004)
- "Tard wisq"
- "Qiegħ il-flixkun"
- "Ħelu u tal-Ġenn" (2005)
- "Min Hi?"
- "Għaċ-Ċkejkna"
- "Pino"
- "'Il Fuq"
- "Lil Malta" (2006)
- "Ir-Rebbiegħa" (2007)
- "Ħielsa"
