= Donat of the Order of Saint John (chartered 1888) =

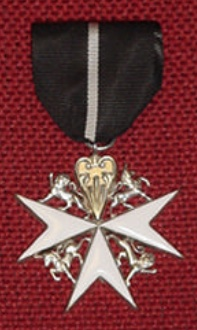
- Silver Cross of the order

Awarded by Order of Saint John
- Type: Insignia
- Eligibility: Men and Women (Donats) for their contribution to the Venerable Order
- Grades: Gold Cross; Silver Cross; Bronze Cross
- Ribbon bar of the insignia

Donat of the Order of Saint John is a distinction awarded by the Order of Saint John. Any person not being a Member of the Venerable Order of St. John who from an appreciation of the objects or work of the Order makes a worthy contribution to its funds or to the funds of a Priory may be appointed by the Grand Prior, on the recommendation of the Grand Council, a Donat of the Order; or by the Prior of a Priory, on the recommendation of his Priory Chapter, to be a Donat of the Priory and thereafter his name shall be recorded in the List of Donats of the Order which shall be maintained by the Secretary-General or as the case may be in the List of Donats of the Priory which shall be maintained by the proper officer of the Priory.

The rights and privileges of a Donat of a Priory shall in all respects be the same as those of a Donat of the Order. The appointment of a Donat shall lapse and his name shall be deleted from the List of Donats if he shall subsequently be admitted as a Member of the Order in any Grade.

The Donat's Badge is the Badge of the Order without the upper arm. A woman who is appointed a Donat suspends her Badge from a bow.

Donats of the Order have included:

Date	Name
25 November 1911	Nawab Mir Osman Ali Khan Nizam of Hyderabad
25 November 1911	Maharaja Sir Krishna Raja Wadiyar Bahadur GCSI of Mysore
25 November 1911	Maharaja Sir Madho Rao Scindia Bahadur GCSI GCVO of Gwalior
25 November 1911	Maharajadhiraja Tukoji Rao Holkar Bahadur of Indore
25 November 1911	Maharajadhiraja Sawai Sir Madho Singh Bahadur GCSI GCIE GCVO of Jaipur
25 November 1911	Mir Imam Bakhsh Khan Talpur of Khairpur
25 November 1911	Maharana Sir Ghanashyamsinhji of Dhrangadhra
25 November 1911	Jam Sahib Ranjitsinhji Vibhaji of Nawanagar
25 November 1911	Raja Sir Bane Singh KCIE of Rajgarh
5 August 1913	Rai Bahadur Lieutenant-Colonel Dhanpat Rai (Khatri) CIE (Commandant, Jaipur Transport Corps)
23 June 1917	Maharaja Govind Singh Judeo of Datia
23 June 1917	Raja Rudra Pratap Deo of Bastar
23 June 1917	Maharaja Bahadur Raghunath Saran Singh Deo of Sarguja

== See also ==
- List of the priors of Saint John of Jerusalem in England
- Museum of the Order of St John
- Service Medal of the Order of St John
- Order of Saint John (Bailiwick of Brandenburg)
- Sovereign Military Order of Malta
- List of bailiffs and dames grand cross of the Order of St John
