= Lydia Caruana =

Maltese operatic soprano

Lydia Caruana is a Maltese operatic soprano who performs in the opera houses and concert halls of Europe and her native Malta. She has sung in two rarely performed operas by Maltese composers, Carmelo Pace's I martiri and Nicolo Isouard's Jeannot et Colin.

== Biography ==
Lydia Caruana was born in Malta, and initially studied music at the Johann Strauss School of Music in Valletta. She later furthered her studies in singing with the Maltese soprano Antoinette Miggiani and took master classes in Vienna with the Armenian-Austrian soprano, Sona Ghazarian. She made her operatic debut as Musetta in La bohème at the Teatru Manoel in Valletta in 1995.

Amongst the roles she has performed in Italy and Malta are the title role in Suor Angelica, Mimi in La bohème, Norina in Don Pasquale, Elvira in Don Giovanni and Rosalinde in Die Fledermaus. She has also sung in rarely performed operas such as Nicolo Isouard’s Jeannot et Colin (as Thérèse) and Carmelo Pace's I martiri (as Graziella). While she retains her interest in performing and creating roles which are not in the standard operatic repertoire, she continues to perform in Italian opera, as in her concerts with the Berwald Symphony Orchestra of Stockholm conducted by Manfred Honeck and the Malta Philharmonic Orchestra conducted by Charles Olivieri Monroe.

Caruana has sung in major concert halls across Europe such as the Musikverein in Vienna, National Concert Hall in Dublin, Laeiszhalle in Hamburg, Theatre of the Estates in Prague and Accademia Filarmonica di Bologna. In 2005, concert tours with the Belarusian State Symphony Orchestra took her to 16 German cities. She also sang in the Das Neue Europa Festival in Ingolstadt accompanied by the Georgian Chamber Orchestra. During 2006 she presented a Mozart programme in the final concert of the Valletta International Sacred Music Festival, a programme which she also performed in St. Giles Cathedral, Edinburgh. In 2007 Caruana partnered, on different occasions, José Carreras and Andrea Bocelli in Malta and Joseph Calleja in Regensburg for the Rathaus concert series.

Lydia Caruana is also an active recitalist, with a repertoire ranging from Haydn and Liszt to de Falla. In 2006, she gave a series of recitals in Vienna and Malta with pianist Paul Gulda, with whom she also recorded a CD of Mediterranean songs. In 2008, she recorded a programme of Maltese composers, and their European contemporaries for the Austrian broadcasting company ORF in Vienna.

== Recordings ==
- Mediterranean Melodies - Lydia Caruana (soprano) and Paul Gulda (piano), 2007. Label: Gramola.

== Past performances (highlights) ==
=== 2008 ===
- La Bohème (Mimi) - Aurora Opera House, Victoria, Malta
- Malta Felice! - ORF Radiokulturhaus, Vienna
- Malta Felice! - Salzkammergut Festwochen, Gmunden Festwochen Schloss Roith, Gmunden
- Lydia Caruana in Concert - Mediterranean Centre, Valletta.
- Celebrity Recital of Czech and Maltese Composers - Phoenicia Concert Hall, Valletta

=== 2007 ===
- Concert with José Carreras - Malta Philharmonic Orchestra; St George's Square, Valletta
- Concerto del soprano Lydia Caruana - Accademia di Bologna, Bologna
- Rathauskonzerte Series 2007 - Rathaus, Regensburg
- Love is in the Air - Presidential Palace, Valletta
- 20th Century Music from Malta - Estates Theatre, Prague
- Sterling Opera Recital' - Phoenicia Concert Hall, Valletta

=== 2006 ===
- Concert with Andrea Bocelli - Malta Convention Centre
- International Opera Gala - National Concert Hall, Dublin and City Hall, Cork
- A Celebration of Mediterranean Arias - Bösendorfer-Saal, Vienna
- Opera Gala Concert - Badner Stadttheatre Orchestra; Teatru Manoel, Valletta
- A Celebration of Mediterranean Arias - Teatru Manoel, Valletta
- Finale Concert - International Sacred Music Festival; Vienna-Malta Baroque Ensemble; St John's Cathedral, Valletta
- Semper Europa Nostra - concert; Auberge d’Aragon, Valletta

=== 2005 ===
- An Evening of Romantic Arias - St. Finbarr's Cathedral, Cork
- Nations in Dialogue - concert; Palazzo Parisio, Valletta
- Concert with Soloists of the Vienna Chamber Orchestra - Teatru Manoel, Valletta
- Das Neue Europa - concert, Stadttheater, Ingolstadt
- 16 city concert tour - Wiener Johann Strauss Philharmonie of Belarus

=== Before 2005 ===
- Don Giovanni (Elvira) - Teatru Manoel, Valletta
- Crossroads of Civilisations - United Nations Concert; WIPO, Geneva
- Mozart Concert in St Giles, Edinburgh, Scotland
- Don Pasquale (Norina) - new production; Teatro Petrarca, Arezzo; Teatro di Valdarno, Valdarno; Teatru Manoel, Valletta
- La bohème (Musetta) - Teatru Manoel, Valletta
- I martiri (Graziella) - Teatru Manoel, Valletta
- Die Fledermaus (Rosalinde) - Teatru Manoel, Valletta
- Puccini Gala Night - Teatru Manoel, Valletta
- Stabat Mater - Commemoration Concert; Teatru Manoel, Valletta
- Jeannot et Colin (Thèrése) - Teatru Manoel, Valletta
