= La Barokka =

La Barokka is the stage name of the Maltese singer Maria Muscat, a well-known figure on Maltese television. In addition to her concerts in Malta, La Barokka has also toured the US and the UK.

== Background ==
Born in Malta, La Barokka started vocal training when she was sixteen, which led her into participating in various Maltese musicals. In 2000, she gave her début concert in the Mdina Cathedral in Malta. This concert attracted a crowd of around 900, which included the president of the Republic of Malta and the prime minister. On hearing her, the president invited her to give a concert at his palace in San Anton Gardens that same year. In the following years, La Barokka gave another concert at the Saint James Cavalier, and another in St. Julian's at the Bay Street complex.

In 2004, La Barokka released the single "You", a blend of classical and hip hop music, with music by Elton Zarb and Tonio Cardona of Freetime Studios and lyrics by Robbie Govus. The song also featured the hip hop singer Pendemonium. In 2005, the song was chosen by the New York Filming Academy for a music video shot in London. 2004 also saw La Barokka give two concerts at the Hilton and the Corinithia Palace in Malta. In 2007, she started to produce her own TV show, produced with American co-host John Di Lemme. In the same year she undertook her first show in Atlanta.

In 2007, La Barokka released the single "A Different Day", created for the 'Find Your Why Main Event' in Atlanta, US. The song was written by Robert Govus and composed by Elton Zarb.

The show's first "season" has been viewed by not less than 28,000 people (almost 7 percent of the Maltese TV audience share, according to a Maltese Broadcasting Authority survey).

In April 2009, La Barokka performed and produced 'He Lives In You, Live in Concert', in Valletta, Malta, a concert that attracted hundreds of people and was also aired on the Maltese national TV station, PBS. La Barokka sang with Italian singer Jonie Falcone in Rome, and recorded a song with Don't Worry Records. The song "Cruel" is part of Jonie Falcone's double album sold in Europe and United States.
