= Anthony Zarb =

Maltese strongman

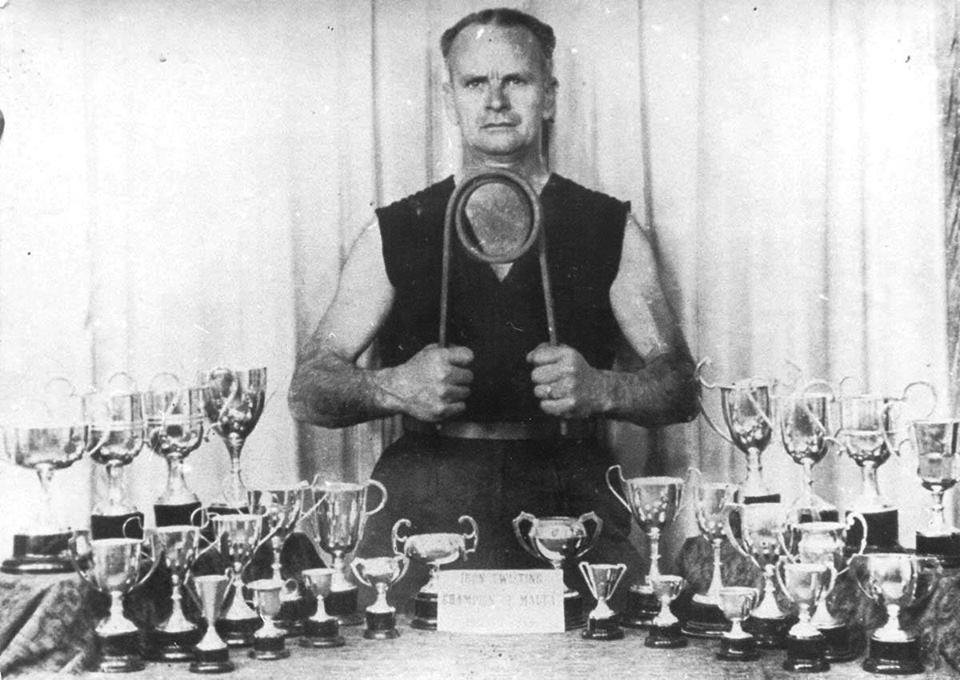
- Anthony "il-Walker" Zarb

Personal information
- Nationality: Maltese
- Born: 14 July 1904 Valletta, Malta

Sport
- Sport: Strongman

Anthony "il-Walker" Zarb (1904–1993), was a performing oldtime strongman from the isle of Malta who performed feats of strength shows from the 1920s until the 1970s. Zarb was known as "il-Walker" and the "Steel Bending Champion of Malta" and was renowned in Malta for his steel bending shows.

== Early life ==
Anthony Zarb was born to Carmelo and Paola Zarb in Valletta, Malta on the 14 July 1904. Zarb was born into a large family consisting of eight siblings in total. In later years Zarb was married twice having a total of 26 children.

== Training ==
During his younger years Zarb was interested in playing football. However, in later years Zarb began training to bend steel after watching a steel bending performance by an Italian Strongman. Zarb eventually became a renowned steel bender in Malta by the late 1920s after winning his first steel bending competition at San Anton Gardens.

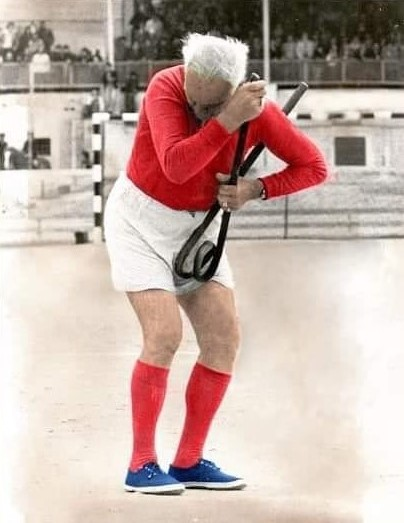
Anthony 'il-Walker' Zarb performing at the Empire Stadium in Gzira in his later years.

== Career ==
Zarb started his performing strongman career during the late 1920s. At the beginning of his career Zarb began performing at a number of venues around Malta, including at festivals, fairs and at the Blue Arena in Zabbar, Malta. Later during his performing career he performed at the Empire Stadium in Gzira, Malta where he would perform steel bending shows during football matches at half-time, sometimes in front of crowds of over 20,000 people. Zarb's shows were almost always dedicated to raising money for charity. During his performances Zarb performed feats of strength related to bending steel. Some of Zarb's steel bending feats involved him consistently following the same routine which enabled him to scroll steel. He would first display a two-inch-thick straight iron rod to everyone in attendance. Following this he would bend it under his knee, bending it to an acute angle. Zarb would then bend the iron rod further with his own hands until it formed a circle, at which point he applied further pressure on his thigh to cause the ends of each side to protrude straight from the circle. Zarb continued performing into his later years eventually retiring in the 1970s.

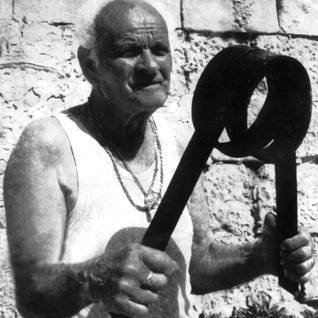
Anthony 'il-Walker' Zarb showing off a piece of scrolled steel in his later years.

== Death ==
Zarb died 11 February 1993 at the age of 89.
