= Steve Zenchuk =

English footballer

Personal information
- Full name: Steven John Zenchuk
- Date of birth: 20 November 1966 (age 59)
- Place of birth: Peterborough, England
- Position: Goalkeeper

Senior career*
Years	Team	Apps	(Gls)
1983–1984	Peterborough United	1	(0)
	Stamford	?	(?)
	Holbeach United	?	(?)
	Eye United	?	(?)
- * Club domestic league appearances and goals

Steven John Zenchuk (born 20 November 1966 in Peterborough) is an English former professional footballer who played in the Football League, as a goalkeeper.
