= Antoinette Miggiani =

Maltese opera singer (1937–2026)

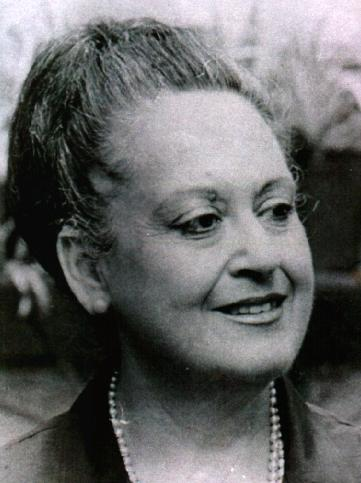
- Born: 5 September 1937; Sliema, Malta
- Died: 29 June 2026 (aged 88)
- Occupation: Operatic soprano
- Awards: Medal for Service to the Republic of Malta

Antoinette Miggiani (5 September 1937 – 29 June 2026) was a Maltese operatic soprano and singing teacher. She made an international career, but returned to Malta to care for her parents.

== Life and career ==
Antoinette Miggiani was born in Sliema, Malta, on 5 September 1937. After studying piano and voice in her native country, she won a British Council scholarship to study at London's Royal Academy of Music in 1958. After winning the International Singers' Competition of the Royal Liverpool Philharmonic Society, she had a contract with the Royal Opera House for the 1961/62 seasons. During the 1960s, she sang in London, France, Germany, and Italy (where she gave several recitals for Italian Radio). She returned several times to Malta where she sang at the Manoel Theatre as Leonora in Verdi's La forza del destino (1963) and Santuzza in Mascagni's Cavalleria rusticana (1965), as well as a Royal gala performance at the theatre for Queen Elizabeth II and Prince Philip in 1967. In 1968 she undertook a tour of the United States, where she sang both in recital and on the opera stage, including performances as Maddalena in Giordanu's Andrea Chénier at Seattle Opera with Franco Corelli in the title role.

Her international career was cut short in 1970, when her parents became ill and she returned permanently to Malta to care for them. She continued to sing in Malta in lieder recitals and concerts, and as a soloist in performances of sacred music, including the Mozart's Requiem, Verdi's Requiem, works by Rossini and Elgar, Dvořák's Stabat Mater, and Gounod's St. Cecilia Mass. She also sang in operas at the Manoel Theatre, including the title role of Carmelo Pace's Ipogeana in its 1976 world premiere.

For many years, Miggiani was a distinguished voice teacher in Malta. Her pupils included the soprano Lydia Caruana and baritone Lino Attard. She was awarded her country's Medal for Service to the Republic on 13 December 1991.

Miggiani died on 29 June 2026, at the age of 88.
