= Pierre Mejlak =

Maltese writer

- Occupations: Novelist communications executive
- Employer(s): International Monetary Fund (Global Head of Media, since 2022)
- Writing career
- Notable work: Dak li l-Lejl Iħallik Tgħid (Having Said Goodnight)
- Notable awards: European Union Prize for Literature (2014)

Pierre Mejlak is a novelist and communications executive. Since 2022, he has been the Global Head of Media at the International Monetary Fund (IMF). He previously served as Head of External Relations at the International Finance Corporation (IFC) from 2019 to 2022, and as Head of Campaigns at the European Commission from 2015 to 2019. As a writer of novels and short stories, he received the European Union Prize for Literature in 2014. His work has been translated into multiple languages.

== Biography ==
He has published books for children, adaptations, a novel and two collections of short stories, winning numerous awards, including a Malta Literary Prize, three National Book Awards from Malta, the Commonwealth Essay Writing Award, the Sea of Words European Short Story Award, and the 2014 European Union Prize for Literature.

His first collection of short stories for adults, Qed Nistenniek Niżzla max-Xita (I'm waiting for you to fall with the rain) was published to critical and popular acclaim in February 2009. His second collection, Dak li l-Lejl Ihallik Tgħid (what the night lets you say), was published in June 2011 and was among the 2014 European Union Prize for Literature winners. This prize winning book was later translated into English and released as Having Said Goodnight on World Book Day, Thursday 23 April 2018, at Waterstones in Brussels. This book was also published in Albania by Fan Noli Publishers in April 2017. It was translated into Norwegian by Kristina Quintano and published by Quintano Forlag. The Polish edition of Having Said Goodnight was translated by Krzysztof Szczurek and published by Ksiazkowe Klimaty in spring 2018. There is also a Turkish edition of this book published by Kalem. The book is published in Bulgaria by ICU Publishing.

A number of his short stories have been translated into English, French, Catalan, Portuguese, Arabic, Spanish and Italian and were read at numerous literary festivals around the world. Mejlak's award-winning novel Riħ Isfel (southern wind) has been turned into a 13-episode prime-time television series for Malta's NET TV.

Two times winner of the Malta Journalism Award, Mejlak worked as a journalist from 1999 to 2005. He was a BBC correspondent, a regular columnist for Malta's daily In-Nazzjon and produced radio shows - including 60 one-hour documentaries for various national radio stations.

From an early age, Pierre J. Mejlak published a number of magazines, including his own monthly magazine Il-Fwieha tan-Narcisa, which he wrote, edited and published from January 1996 to December 2000.

In 2004 he left Malta for Luxembourg to work at the EU Publications Office. He then moved to Brussels, where he worked at the Council of the EU and the European Commission. Mejlak returned to Valletta for a 3-year sabbatical in 2010, where he worked in the Office of the Prime Minister. During this time he was involved in Valletta's bid to host the 2018 European Capital of Culture.

== Awards and honours ==
- 2014 European Union Prize for Literature, Malta, Dak li l-Lejl Iħallik Tgħid

== Novels / short story collections ==
- Trab Abjad (White Dust, 1999) — short novel for children
- Meta Nstabu l-Anġli (When the angels were found, 2002) — short novel for children
- Riħ Isfel (Southern Wind, 2007) — cross-over novel
- Qed Nistenniek Nieżla max-Xita (I'm waiting for you to fall with the rain, 2009) — short stories for adults
- Dak li l-Lejl Iħallik Tgħid (What the night lets you say, 2011) — short stories for adults
- Having Said Goodnight (2014) — short stories for adults

== Adaptations ==
- Stejjer mill-Bibbja (Bible Stories, 2003)
- Enċiklopedija għat-Tfal (Children's Encyclopedia, 2005)
- Il-Ħajja ta' Ġesú' (The Story of Christ, 2009)

== Screenplays ==
- Riħ Isfel (Southern Wind, 2010) — 13-episode drama on Malta's Net TV
