= Albert Garzia =

- Born: 27 July 1977 (age 48)
- Origin: Malta
- Genres: Contemporary music
- Occupations: Composer, musician, music teacher

Albert Garzia (born July 27, 1977) is a Maltese composer, musician, and music teacher. At an early age, he began his musical training as an accordionist under the tutelage of Maltese Composer Dorselle Mifsud, with whom he later studied piano performance.

== Education ==
Initially an Industrial Electronics major, Garzia's fascination with music led him to pursue music composition at the University of Malta, eventually graduating with a bachelor's degree in Music Studies alongside a diploma in Sacred Music. He would later go on to complete a master's degree in music at the Royal Northern College of Music in Manchester. At the RNCM, he met and studied with fellow musicians Adam Gorb, Paul Patterson, David Horne, and Gary Carpenter.

== Career ==
Garzia is a versatile musician, with his talents ranging from orchestral to chamber arrangements. A few of his piano compositions have been published for pedagogical use. He has performed in composition competitions. In addition, he has also collaborated with drama theatres, choreographers, poets, and film-directors.

Sometime in 2004, Garzia joined the Maltese modern folk sextet Walter Micallef u l-Ħbieb.
