= Sigmund Mifsud =

Maltese musician

Sigmund Mifsud is a Maltese trumpeter, musical director, arranger, and concert producer who served as the CEO of the Malta Philharmonic Orchestra (MPO) from 2013 to 2022.

== Education and early years ==
Mifsud began his musical education playing the trumpet with the Sliema Band Club at age 11. He continued his study of music theory and orchestration with Anthony Chircop at the Johann Strauss School of Music in Valletta.

Mifsud then studied harmony and counterpoint for three years with Maltese composer Carmelo Pace. At age 16, he collaborated with Paul Borg in practical sessions on trumpet playing, and later continued to work on advanced harmony and orchestration. Mifsud also studied conducting under the guidance of Mr. Brian Schembri.

== Musical career ==
Mifsud was a full-time member of the Malta Philharmonic Orchestra and a member of the Versatile Brass Ensemble. He has performed with the ensemble in Germany, Italy and other countries, as well as many performances in Malta and Gozo.

His career as a performer includes performing as a session musician with various orchestras in musical production, television appearances, and solo recitals. Mifsud also performed as a lead trumpeter with the Johann Strauss School of Music Big Band in three editions of the Malta Jazz Festival. He is currently the assistant Band Master of the Sliema Band Club and was a founder of the Sliema Youth Band.

He started experimenting with the fusion of classical and pop music with the Kenya Fund Raising Concerts, where he amalgamated a string orchestra with a wind band. He has presented his work on other occasions, including during the EU Accession Celebrations in 2003.

In 2005, Mifsud produced the first edition of the National Orchestra Goes Pop and the second edition in 2006. He has also taken up the role of musical director of the National Orchestra.

Mifsud was appointed Executive Chairman (CEO) of the Malta Philharmonic Orchestra (MPO) in 2013 and served until his resignation in 2022.

== Legal issues ==
In 2022, Mifsud was charged with attempted evidence tampering regarding a male MPO employee's admitted sexual harassment of a female staff member. He resigned in 2022 after intense pressure to do so from MPO members. Mifsud was found guilty of attempting to obstruct justice and sentenced to 6 months imprisonment. He was cleared of charges related to moral or psychological violence and causing fear of violence.
