= Joe Falzon (strongman) =

Maltese strongman

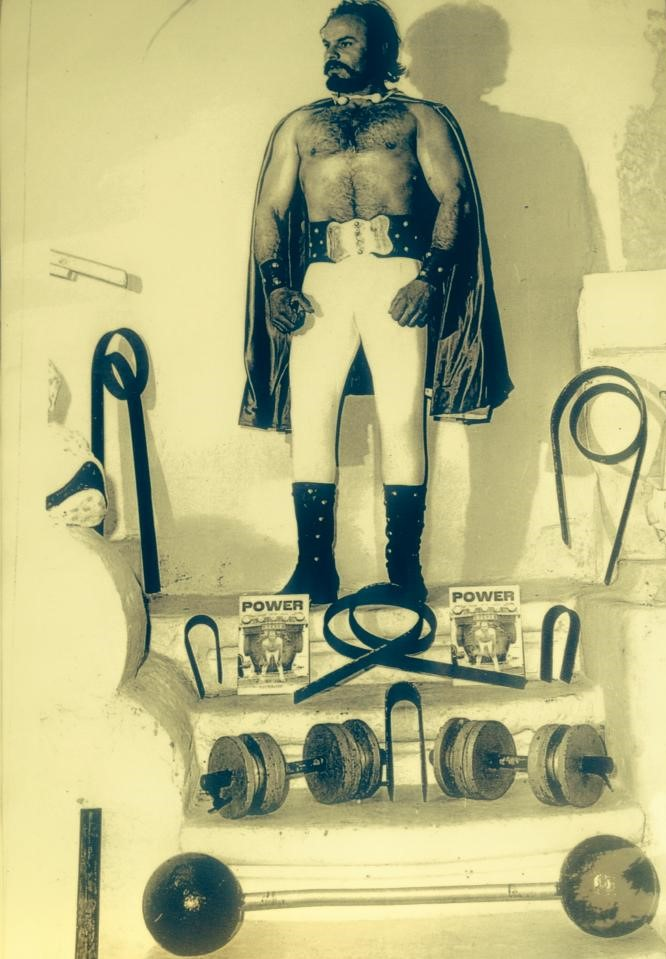
- Joe "Powerful" Falzon

Personal information
- Nationality: Maltese
- Born: November 9, 1932 Zejtun, Malta

Sport
- Sport: Strongman

Joe "Powerful" Falzon (1932–2023), was a performing oldtime strongman from the isle of Malta who performed feats of strength shows during the 1960s and 1970s. Falzon was known as "The Powerful" and "The Strongman" and was also known as the strongest man in Malta.

== Early life ==
Joe Falzon was born to Joseph and Cetta Falzon in Zejtun, Malta on 9 November 1932. Falzon was born into a very large family consisting of twenty five siblings in total.

== Training ==
During his younger years Falzon was interested in bodybuilding, eventually becoming a renowned bodybuilder in Malta by the age of 20. Falzon later trained acrobatics, eventually becoming an accomplished acrobat and trapeze artist recognised by the British Acrobatic Association. Falzon would later own a gymnasium in his hometown of Zejtun where he would then train to become a strongman. In his later years Falzon would train mostly at home where he had a gym equipped with weightlifting and exercise equipment.

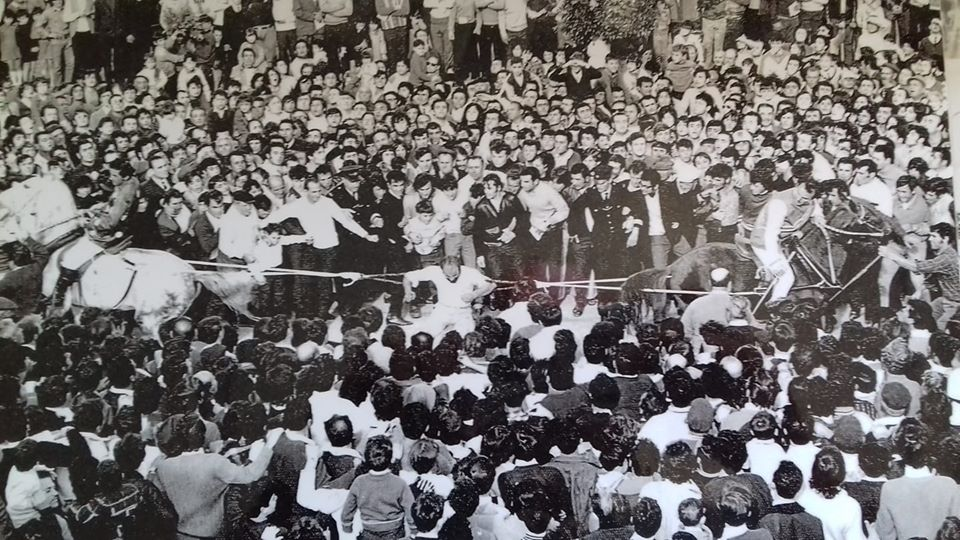
Joe "Powerful" Falzon holding two whipped horses from breaking his grip.

== Career ==
Falzon started his performing strongman career during the 1960s. At the beginning of his career Falzon began performing with his family and other performers at a number of venues and theatres around Malta and Gozo. During his performances Falzon would perform feats of strength as well as dangerous stunts. Some of Falzon's feats involved him lifting heavy objects with his teeth, blowing up hot-water bottles and truck tyres with his breath, pulling vehicles with his hair and spending twelve hours lying on a bed of nails, among other feats. Falzon also performed a pulling feat in which he would pull two buses weighing 8 tonnes each. Falzon also performed with his children in a group called 'The Magnificent Seven' who performed acrobatic shows 24 times a year. Falzon is widely regarded as being one of the first strongmen in the world to pull a full-sized jumbo jet in the 1960s. Falzon was also known to perform feats such as laying on broken glass while being run over by a car and holding two whipped horses from breaking his grip. Falzon also toured the United Kingdom during the 1970s, where in Manchester he managed to push a train weighing over 20 tons.

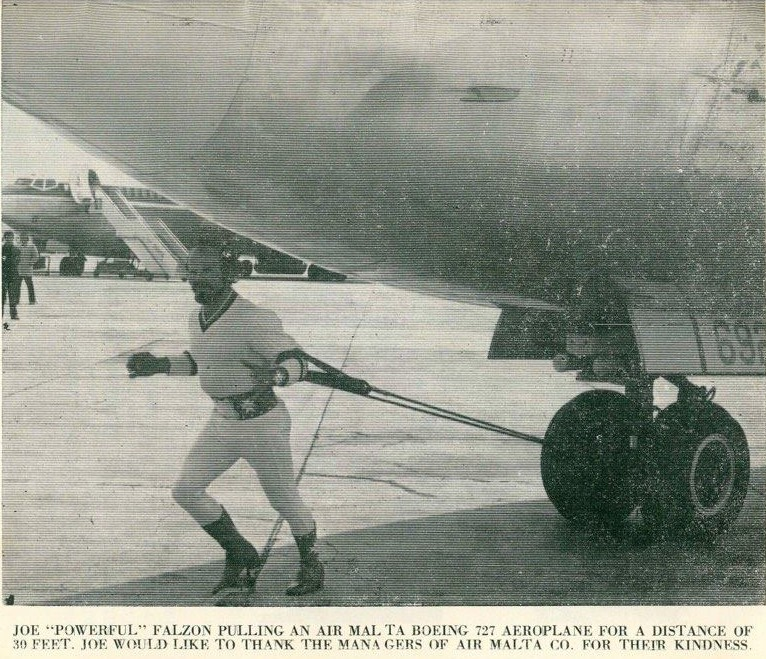
Joe "Powerful" Falzon pulling a Boeing 727 jumbo jet.

== Death ==
Falzon died 31 March 2023 at the age of 90.
