= Paul Grima =

Maltese strongman

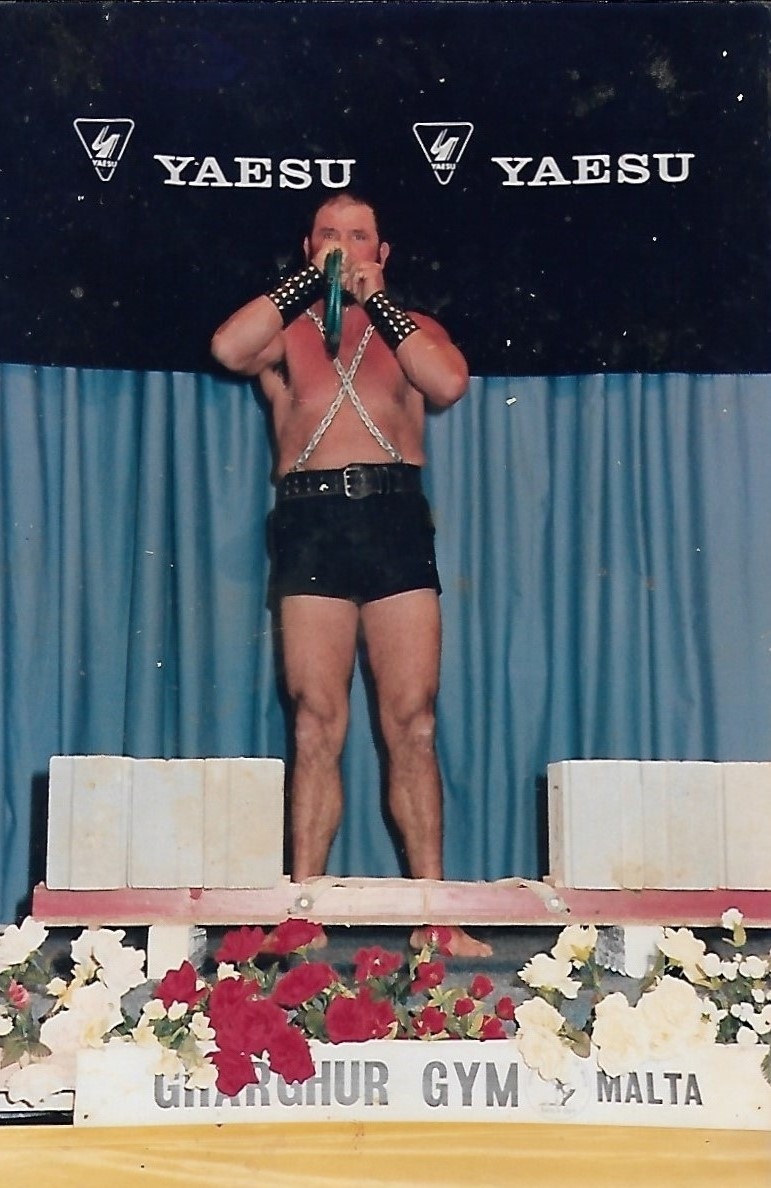
- Paul "Mr. Cool" Grima

Personal information
- Nationality: Maltese

Sport
- Sport: Strongman

Paul "Mr. Cool" Grima is a performing strongman from Malta.

== Training ==
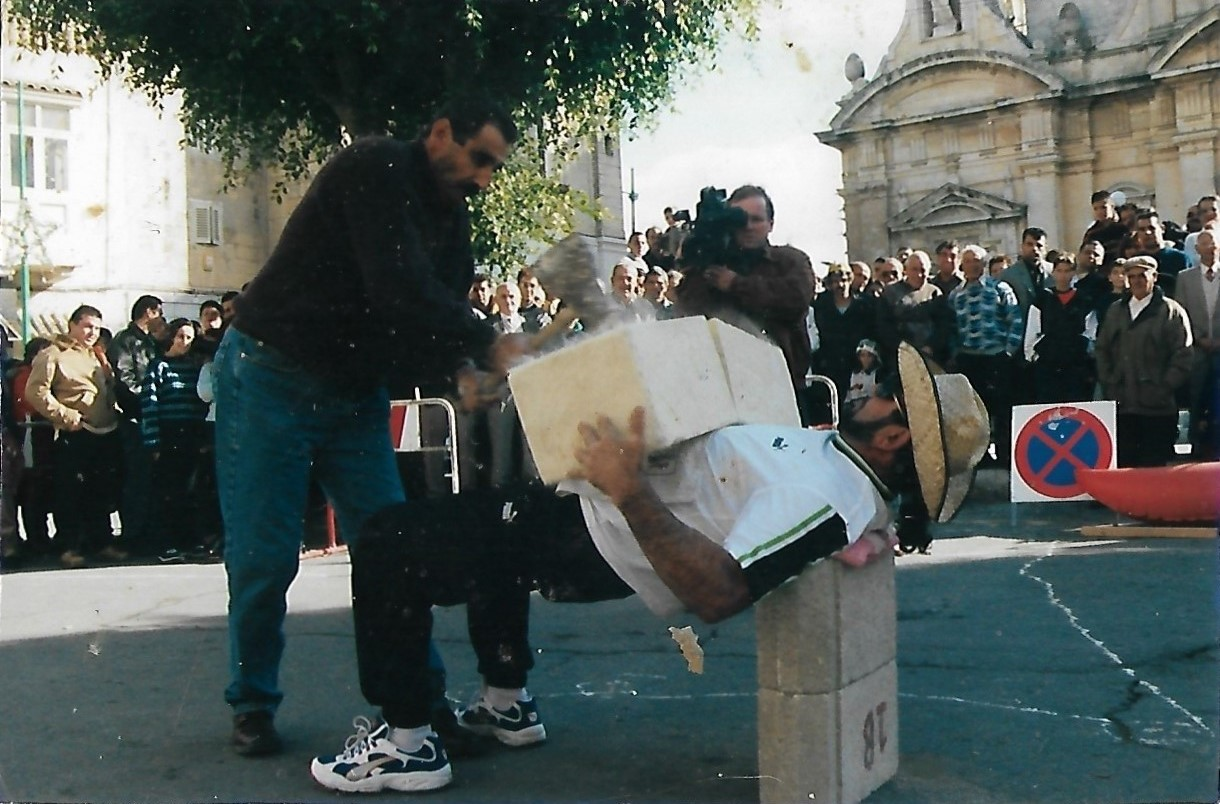
Paul "Mr. Cool" Grima getting a limestone block split in two on his stomach.

Grima began training when he was 16 years old, and began his strongman act at age 44.

== Career ==
In 2020, Grima was 68, and performed on "Malta's Got Talent episode 5". For "a number of years" he had been performing in strongman shows, where he would lift heavy fridges, and pull trucks with his hair. Also known as "Mr Cool", he was "one of the Maltese legends in his field. In 2019, Grima performed at a charity event. In 2020 Grima at the age of 70 performed on episode 5 of the first season of Malta's Got Talent where he received four yeses from the judges
