= Pawlu Camilleri =

- Pawlu Camilleri l-Bibi performing in San Ġiljan, Malta, August 2001.

Background information
- Also known as: Il-Bibi
- Born: Pawlu Camilleri; 12 November 1958 (age 67)
- Origin: Valletta Malta
- Genres: Modern Folk
- Instruments: harmonica and piano

Pawlu Camilleri is one of Malta's leading harmonica musicians.

== Biography ==
Born in Valletta, Pawlu grew up in the neighbourhood of Id-Due Balli, a working class area of the Maltese capital city.

Son of Frankie Camilleri Il-Bibi, a noted Maltese jazz musician, and brother to drummer Joe Camilleri, Pawlu has released a number of religious albums, including Jesus' Words in 1995. He is about to release another in English entitled Faithful.

Camilleri is also currently working on a Biblical album in Maltese, composing lyrics and melodies inspired by the Old Testament and New Testament. Two songs, "Min Jiġi Għandi" and "GĦidli Ħabib", were already performed during concerts.

He has featured on harmonica in Dominic Galea's jazz album Tribute, Andrew Cauchi's Bil-Qawwa ta' Mħabbtek and in both of Walter Micallef's albums, M'Jien Xejn and Ħamsin.

He has sung also "Ġewwa Paceville" in the Il-Għanja tal-Poplu festival in 2003. This song, written by Vince Żammit, won the Best Lyrics Award. Camilleri sings regularly at correctional facilities and drug rehab houses in Malta, with his themes focusing on songs of courage and praise of Jesus Christ.
