= Walter Cornelius =

Latvian strongman, stuntman and philanthropist

Walter Cornelius (Note: otherwise, Walter Janovich Cornelius, otherwise Walter Cornelius, otherwise Walter Kornelius, otherwise Walter Korneev, otherwise Voldemars Janovich Korneev, otherwise Voldemars Kornejus) (born Voldemārs Korņejevs; 11 April 1924 – 23 September 1983) was a Latvian strongman, stuntman and philanthropist who escaped the Iron Curtain and settled in Peterborough, England, where he gained notoriety by taking part in a range of bizarre stunts.

Cornelius left Soviet-occupied Latvia and made it to the West by swimming the Baltic Sea. During the swim he was fired at by guards, but despite being shot in the stomach, he made a successful escape. Settling in Peterborough, where he remained for the rest of his life, he worked as a lifeguard at the city's Lido. He received naturalisation in 1971.

Cornelius gained notoriety by exhibiting feats of great strength and stamina, as well as carrying out bizarre novelty stunts such as pushing a pea through the city with his nose, letting people use a sledgehammer to break a slab of concrete that he had on his head, and walking miles on his hands. Perhaps his most famous stunt, as the "Daredevil Birdman", was his annual (unrealistic) attempt to fly across the River Nene by wearing a bird-suit and flapping huge wings attached to his arms. Although doomed to failure, each "flight attempt" gained publicity and drew large crowds. In July 1967, he appeared on BBC's Blue Peter when John Noakes used a sledge hammer to break a concrete slab on Cornelius's head.

A philanthropist in later life, while working at the Lido he would urge the more proficient swimmers to take up bodybuilding. In 2016, Peterborough Lido erected a silhouette of Cornelius as a weathercock on the swimming pool's weather vane.
