= Jes Psaila =

- Jes Psaila performing at The Powerhouse, March 2007.

Background information
- Birth name: Jesmond Psaila
- Born: February 23, 1964
- Origin: Valletta Malta
- Genres: Fusion
- Occupations: Guitarist; Maltese language
- Instruments: Guitar
- Years active: 1982 – present

Jes Psaila (born on 23 February 1964) is a Maltese guitarist.

Psaila began his musical career as an electric guitarist in 1982 playing with various rock groups, most notably with the Maltese progressive rock band Avatar. At that time other prominent Maltese rock bands included Marsascala-based Mirage, Over and Stratkast. With Psaila the founding members of Avatar were Aidan Zammit Lupi, Ivan Scicluna, Sean Griscti and Karl Griscti. The band gave memorable concerts in most of Malta's large venues and clubs, and was especially known for the intricate harmonised solos on two guitars. With Avatar, he supported the Ghanaian band Osibisa during a concert at the Mediterranean Conference Centre in Valletta in 1984. Zammit Lupi and the Griscti brothers left Malta by 1985 and the band never reunited.

The guitarist has also played with the Johan Strauss School of Music Jazz Band. In 2001 he played electric guitar in Jason Fabri's Jason Paul Band, that also featured deceased double bassist Bernard Scerri. Psaila has been the Voices Choir guitarist between 1991 and 2006 also featured with alternative rock band Syrup, that has since then disbanded.

In November 2003 he performed in Ragusa, Italy in the theatrical production Caravaggio di Merisi: chiaroscuro and in several productions by Theatre Anon.

His first performance with Walter Micallef was during the latter's official launch of M'Jien Xejn at the Erin Serracino Inglott Hall in 2003 and plays the acoustic guitar on the March 2007 album Ħamsin.
