= Donat Spiteri =

Donat Spiteri was (born October 13, 1922 in Marsa, Malta - December 18, 2011) to Spiridione and Antonia née Cassar

Feeling that he was called to be a friar, he joined the Franciscan Order and was ordained on March 13, 1948. He furthered his studies at the Gregorian Pontificial University in Rome where he did his Licence in Theology (Dogmatics). He also studied the Holy Scriptures at Pontificio Istituto Bibblico in Rome where he did his licence in the Holy Scripture. He returned to Malta in 1954 and was given the responsibility of teaching young Capuchin students.

Between 1958 and 1967 he was parish priest of the Holy Trinity Church in Marsa. Throughout those years he was instrumental in the construction of the parochial centre St. Pius X. Between 1983 and 1991, again he was asked to serve as a parish priest of Our Lady of Lourdes in San Gwann. Throughout the years he served in San Gwann, he again felt the need to gather the lay movements under one roof. Thus, the parochial centre San Guzepp came to be. He found time also to restore the Sta. Margherita chapel - which now houses the Holy Sepulchre for daily adoration.

From 1966 to 1988, he was a lecturer and Professor of Biblical Studies at the Faculty of Theology at the University of Malta where together with Prof. Karm Sant and others set up the Malta Bible Society, of which he was President. The main achievement of this Society was the publication of the Holy Bible in Maltese. The translation commenced in 1966 and continued until it was published in 1984. Since then, the Bible was revised yet again, taking another five years. Hence, the second edition was published in 1996. As the teaching and interpretation of the Bible were and still are his life's mission, he was instrumental in opening Dar il-Bibbja in Floriana as a Bible Centre.

Donat Spiteri is also the author of numerous books of theological and biblical themes, of which il-Ktieb tas-Salmi (Book of Psalms), Dizzjunarju Bibbliku (Bible Dictionary), Temi Teologici (Theological Themes), l-Evangelji ta' San Mattew u San Luqa (The Gospels of St. Matthew and St. Luke), il-Ktieb ta' l-Atti ta' l-Appostli (The Book of the Acts of the Apostles) and many others are being published by the Malta Bible Society. He also was a regular contributor in articles to the local press and various religious magazines such as Dawl Frangiskan, besides lecturing and explaining the Holy Bible on the local media. He also toured various parishes in Malta and Gozo where he gave Biblical courses.

In 1974 Donat felt the need to spread further Bible reading into the Maltese households. Thus, he launched the small booklet Kliem il-Hajja (the Word of Life) which has become synonymous with him. This booklet is issued every quarter and helps and simplifies the daily reading of the Bible. He was the editor since its origin and today is the Director General. Today, this booklet finds its way in many homes throughout Malta and Gozo - and also amongst our Maltese emigrants abroad. It is worth mentioning that over 20,000 Kliem il-Hajja booklets are distributed thanks to the many volunteers. On the 30th Anniversary of this publication, he inaugurated a Kliem il-Hajja office and library inside the Capuchins Friary at Floriana, Malta where most of this booklet is prepared. All those interested in Biblical studies have now another place where to study the Bible more in depth, besides going through the many works of Donat Spiteri.

Donat Spiteri was honoured with the Gieh il-Marsa and Gieh San Gwann by the respective Local Councils as appreciation for his service to their community.

On 13 December 2009 Donat Spiteri was awarded the Midalja għall-Qadi tar-Repubblika (Medal for Service to the Republic) by the President of Malta George Abela, on behalf of the government and people of Malta.

Donat died at the Christus Sacerdos Home for Elderly Priests at Fleur-de-Lys, on December 19, 2011, aged 89.
