= Renzo Spiteri =

Maltese musician

Renzo Spiteri is a Maltese multi-percussionist. Born in Malta, he has studied drums and percussion in Malta and Milan, Italy, under Professor G. Bianchi.

In 2005, he released his solo percussion concert album, This is My Language. He has performed worldwide including in Lisbon, Belfast, Nicosia, at the 2005 Cork European Capital of Culture Festival in Ireland and the 2006 Sori-Womad festival in Jeonju, South Korea. In 2006, he also spent a four-week residency period with the China Conservatory of Music in Beijing.

In 2007, he featured on percussions in the Walter Micallef u l-Ħbieb album Ħamsin (Fifty), for which he made the musical arrangements.

In 2023, he performed in Shetland as part of an ensemble; the Eyland Project.
