= Għaxaq =

Għaxaq Ħal Għaxaq Asciak
- Local council
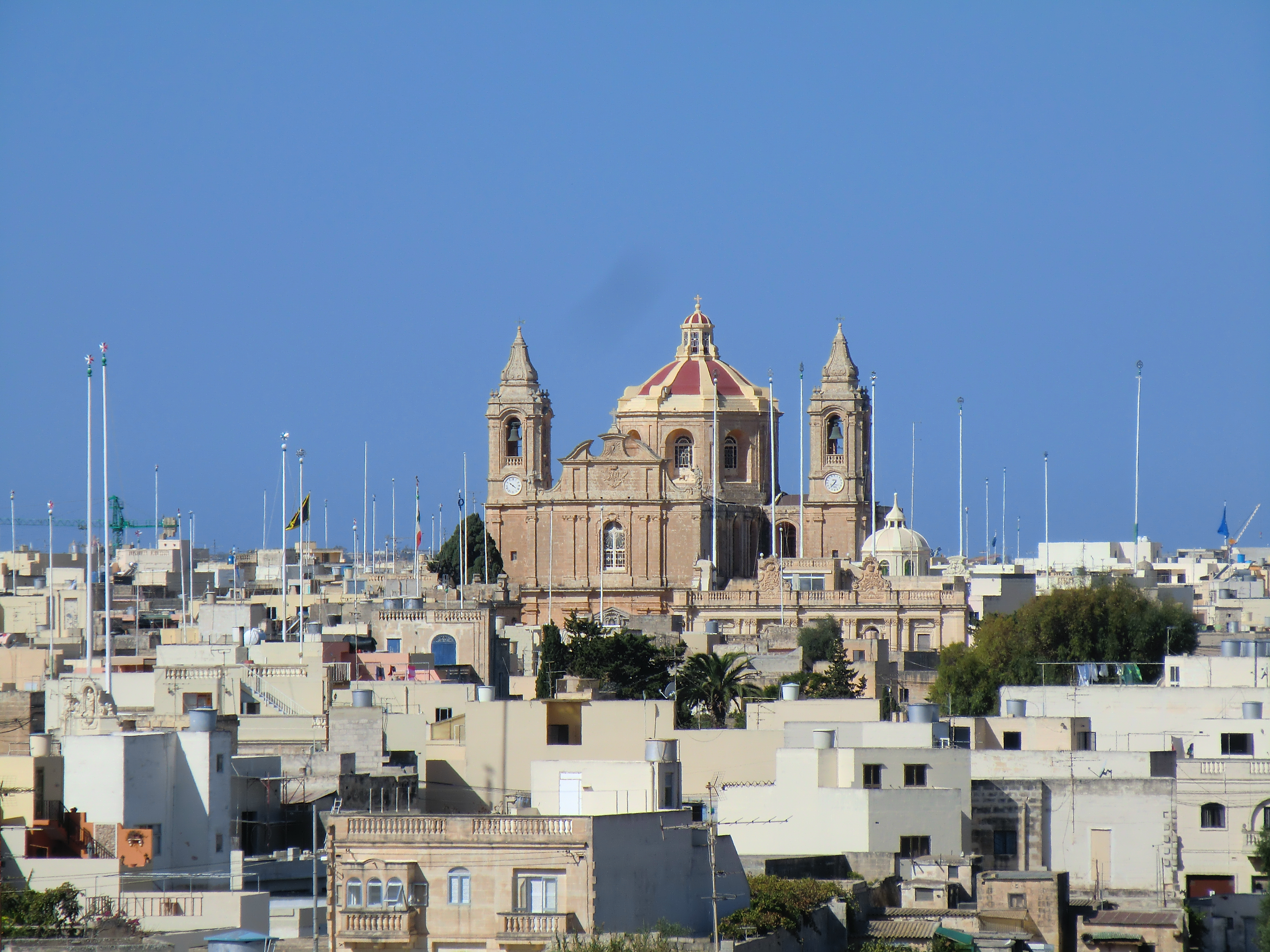
- Għaxaq skyline

- Flag Coat of arms
- Motto: Laeta Sustineo (Ħienja nżommu)
- Għaxaq
- Interactive map of Għaxaq
- Coordinates: 35°50′54″N 14°31′2″E
- Country: Malta
- Region: Southern Region
- District: South Eastern District
- Borders: Birżebbuġa, Gudja, Luqa, Marsaxlokk, Santa Luċija, Tarxien, Żejtun, Żurrieq

Government
  - Mayor: Karl Boxall (PL)

Area
  - Total: 3.9 km^{2} (1.5 sq mi)

Population (Jul 2024)
  - Total: 5,852
  - Density: 1,500/km^{2} (3,900/sq mi)
- Demonym(s): Għaxqi (m), Għaxqija (f), Għaxqin (pl)
- Time zone: UTC+1 (CET)
  - Summer (DST): UTC+2 (CEST)
- Postal code: GXQ
- Dialing code: 356
- ISO 3166 code: MT-17
- Patron saint: Assumption of Our Lady Padron of the church
- Day of festa: 15 August; First week of June
- Website: ghaxaqlc.gov.mt
- Parish priest Dun Gordon Refalo

Għaxaq (Maltese: Ħal Għaxaq, pronounced [ħɐl ˈɐˤːʃɐʔ]) is a village in the Southern Region of Malta. The surrounding areas are predominantly used for agriculture. The population of Għaxaq was 5,852 in July 2024. This included 3,047 males and 2,805 females; 5,235 Maltese nationals and 617 foreign nationals.

The village's name likely originates from the surname of a local noble family, Axiaq (also spelt Axiak or Asciak), who were feudal landholders in the 14th century.

== Saint Mary's Parish Church ==
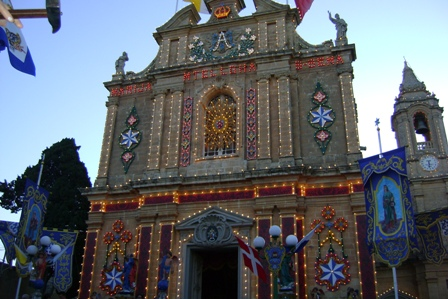
Għaxaq Parish Church decorated for the main village feast dedicated to Saint Mary

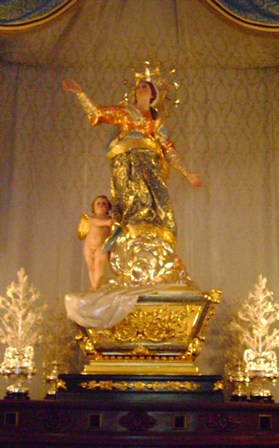
Saint Mary's Statue (1808) known as Santa Marija or L-Assunta

Għaxaq's main church is dedicated to the Assumption of Our Lady and is known for its Baroque architecture. The present church was consecrated on 2 May 1784, after being under construction by the villagers for around fifty years .

There are a large number of artistic and valuable items in this church which were made by renowned Maltese and foreign artists.

=== Statues ===
The titular statue which depicts the Assumption in heaven of our Lady was carved in wood by Mariano Gerada in 1808. Another statue in this church is that of the Main Secondary Feast of Saint Joseph, which was made by Fratelli Bertarelli of Milan, Italy in 1932 and is also carved in wood.

Other statues are those of Our Lady of the Rosary carved in wood by Alessandro Farrugia, Our Lady of Fátima, and a set of traditional eight statues depicting the passion of Jesus Christ. These were made throughout the years with statues of Maltese artists Peppi Vella, Carlo Darmanin, and family Camilleri Cauchi, namely Alfred and Aaron Camilleri Cauchi.

The statue of dead Christ, known as Il-Monument, was brought to Għaxaq from Rome in the 18th century.

=== Paintings ===
The paintings which decorate the church's ceiling were painted by Emvin Cremona during the 1960s, while other works of art date back to the 16th, 17th and 18th centuries, and are mostly painted by Maltese artists; Gio Nicola Buhagiar, Francesco Zahra, Rokku Buhagiar and Gianni Vella among others.

=== Feasts ===
Apart from the Titular feast of Saint Mary, which is celebrated annually on August 15, other feasts are celebrated throughout the year. These are:

- The commemoration of the Passion of Jesus Christ and his rise from death, with the traditional Good Friday procession, which in Għaxaq is held on Palm Sunday evening
- Celebrated a Sunday before Easter, the Main Secondary feast of Saint Joseph celebrated on the first Sunday of June
- Corpus Christi on the second Sunday of June
- Our Lady of the Rosary on the second Sunday of October.

These are all organized by their respective confraternities.

On the night between the 24th and 25 December, a solemn mass is held to celebrate Christmas.

== Band Clubs ==
=== Saint Mary Band Club Ħal Għaxaq A.D 1873 ===
The Saint Mary Band Club was set up from a simple wine shop in 1808, and consists of a religious and a secular aspect. The religious aspect was reflected in the fact that an artistic statue was made by a well known sculptor Mariano Gerada. This was financed by Gio Maria Farrugia (1763–1828) and cost 800 scudi. An artistic plinth was also made.

It was at Ta' Petistina that the first general sitting was held, and it was agreed that the first official committee members were to be drawn via a ballot. The first steering committee was elected, and was made up of Felic Gatt, Joseph Grima, Joseph Scicluna and Geraldu Scicluna. More members were added, like Agius, Abdilla and Gravina. Later on, in 1935, a different band was formed under the name Santa Maria Band.

Today the band club boasts a great number of members and followers. It is also known for the organization of the Għaxaq Music Festival, a 2 to 5 day festival organized before the feast of Saint Mary in August, first starting in 1998 as a street concert. Since 2008, the festival has featured renowned artists and tribute bands such as: Tracy Shields in a Tribute to Celine Dion (2008), Rhapsody UK in a Tribute to Queen (2009 and 2011), U2UK (2009), ABBA UK (2010), Gimme ABBA (2011), Sheyla Bonnick from Boney M. (2011) and the group SMOKIE (2012). It has also featured several Maltese groups and singers such as Tribali, Wintermoods, Scream Daisy, Freddie Portelli, Joe Brown Band, and Għannejja among others.

The Club also possesses several artistic street decorations, having a large number of statues and pedestals dating back to more than 100 years ago. These, together with new sets of drapes, chandeliers, and other statues decorate the village during the first two weeks of August.

=== Saint Joseph Band Club ===
The Saint Joseph Band Club was established in 1874 with the principal object of organizing and enhancing the feast of St. Joseph in collaboration with the Confraternity of Saint Joseph, an older Catholic Church organization dating back to around 1689. Since then, the Band Club has taken under its remit the external festivities while the Confraternity has concentrated on the liturgical celebrations. The Club also used to participate in the feast of the Assumption of St. Mary until the early 1950s, when this participation was discontinued.

The Band Club's biggest project is its premises. During a project spanning from the early 1980s until the official opening in May 2000, the Club acquired both previously rented and adjacent property, demolished the existing structures and rebuilt a unitary building. The building is considered a prime example of Maltese Baroque architecture.

The Band Club is also in possession of two other separate properties: a fireworks factory that is renowned for the quality of its festive fiery production; and a feast decorations factory, comprising a workshop and stores for the Baroque street decorations. The fireworks factory won in the Villa de Bilbao international fireworks festival in 2010 against world-renowned international competitors.

The Club's own band and other guest bands play the typical Maltese band-marches to the Josephite supporters, guests and tourists, who have the option to join in. Street concerts are also held, many times attracting national attention.

== Carnival ==
The Għaxaq Carnival is a traditional community celebration held annually in the Maltese village of Għaxaq during the days leading up to Ash Wednesday. Known for its spontaneous and locally organized nature, the event features homemade costumes, small satirical floats, and lively performances in the town square.

The carnival celebration is reported to have been around for roughly 150 years, and also features a children's parade, an idea backed by the local council to encourage more children to take an interest in their local culture. While smaller in scale than the main Valletta carnival, the Għaxaq Carnival is valued for its creativity and strong local participation.

== Notable places in Għaxaq ==
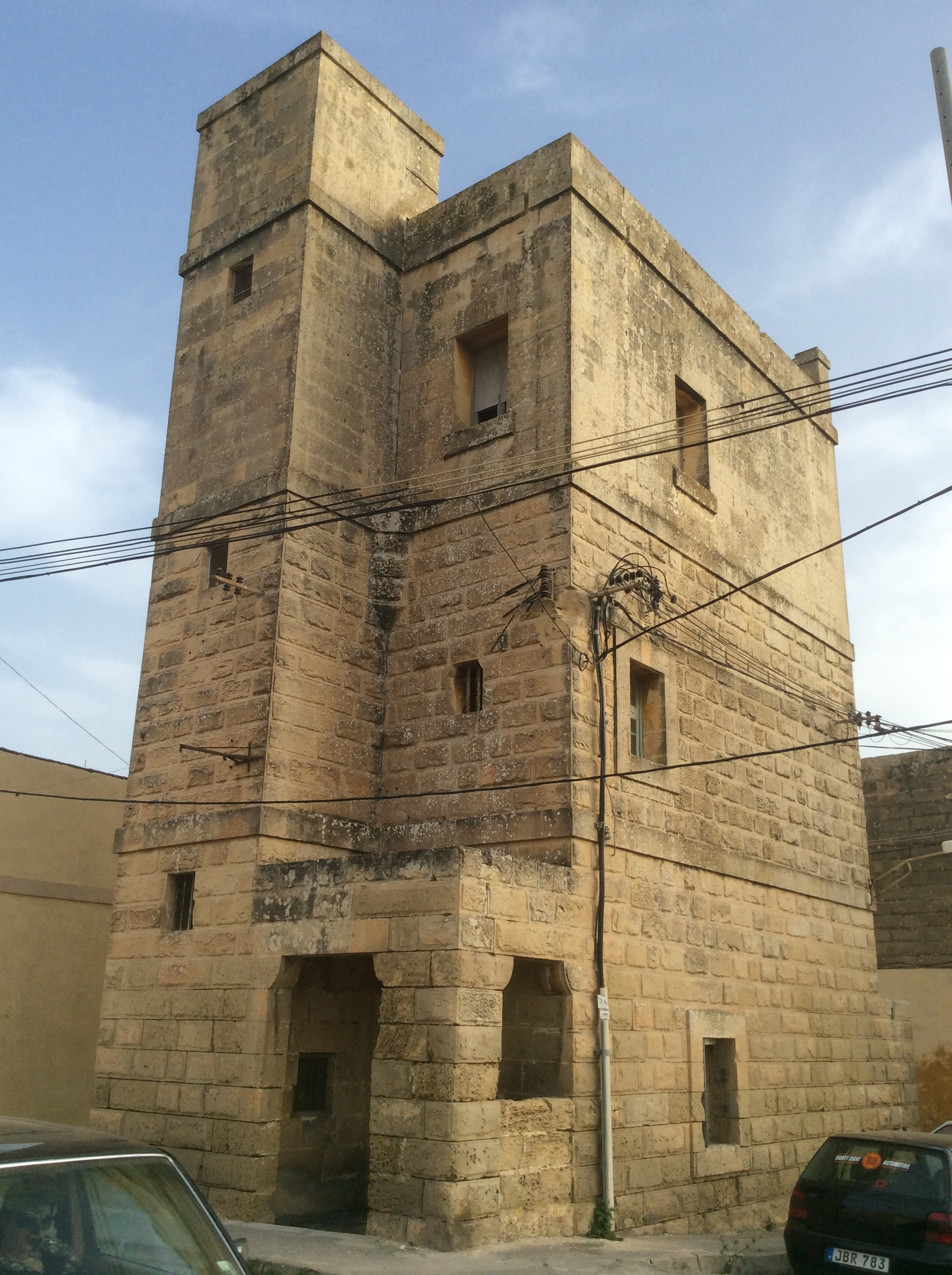
The Għaxaq Semaphore Tower, which was built in 1848

- Dar tal-Bebbux / Dar tal-Massi, a sea-shells decorated house (St. Mary Street, behind the parish church)
- St. Philip's Chapel (at St. Philip Square)
- St. Lucy's Chapel (at the Outskirts of the village)
- Christ the Redeemer Chapel (at the outskirts of the village)
- Għaxaq Semaphore Tower

== Zones in Għaxaq ==
- Bir id-Deheb (Well of Gold)
- Ħas-Saptan (Saptan Town)
- Il-Miksur (The Broken)
- Qasam Ħal-Dmikki
- Tal-Barrani (Foreigner's Village)
- Tal-Garda
- Tal-Ġebel (Rocks' Village)
- Tal-Millieri
- Tal-Qattus (Cat's Village)
- Tal-Wilġa (Open Field's Village)

== Għaxaq Local Council ==
The current Għaxaq local council members are:

- Darren Abela (Mayor – PL)
- Christine Dalli (PL)
- Rose Agius (PN)
- Keith Fenech (PL)
- Andreas Gatt (PL)

== Sport ==
- Għaxaq F.C.
