= Gio Nicola Buhagiar =

- Ġannikol Buhagiar
- Born: 17 May 1698; Żebbuġ, Hospitaller Malta
- Died: 21 March 1752 (aged 53); Valletta, Hospitaller Malta
- Resting place: Basilica of Our Lady of Mount Carmel, Valletta; 35°54′0.7″N 14°30′44.2″E
- Occupation: Painter
- Style: Baroque
- Spouse: Anna Maria Cachia (m. 1719)
- Children: 3
- Parents: Pasquale Buhagiar (father); Leonora Buttigieg (mother)

Gio Nicola Buhagiar (Maltese: Ġannikol Buhagiar, 17 May 1698 – 21 March 1752) was a Maltese painter.

== Biography ==
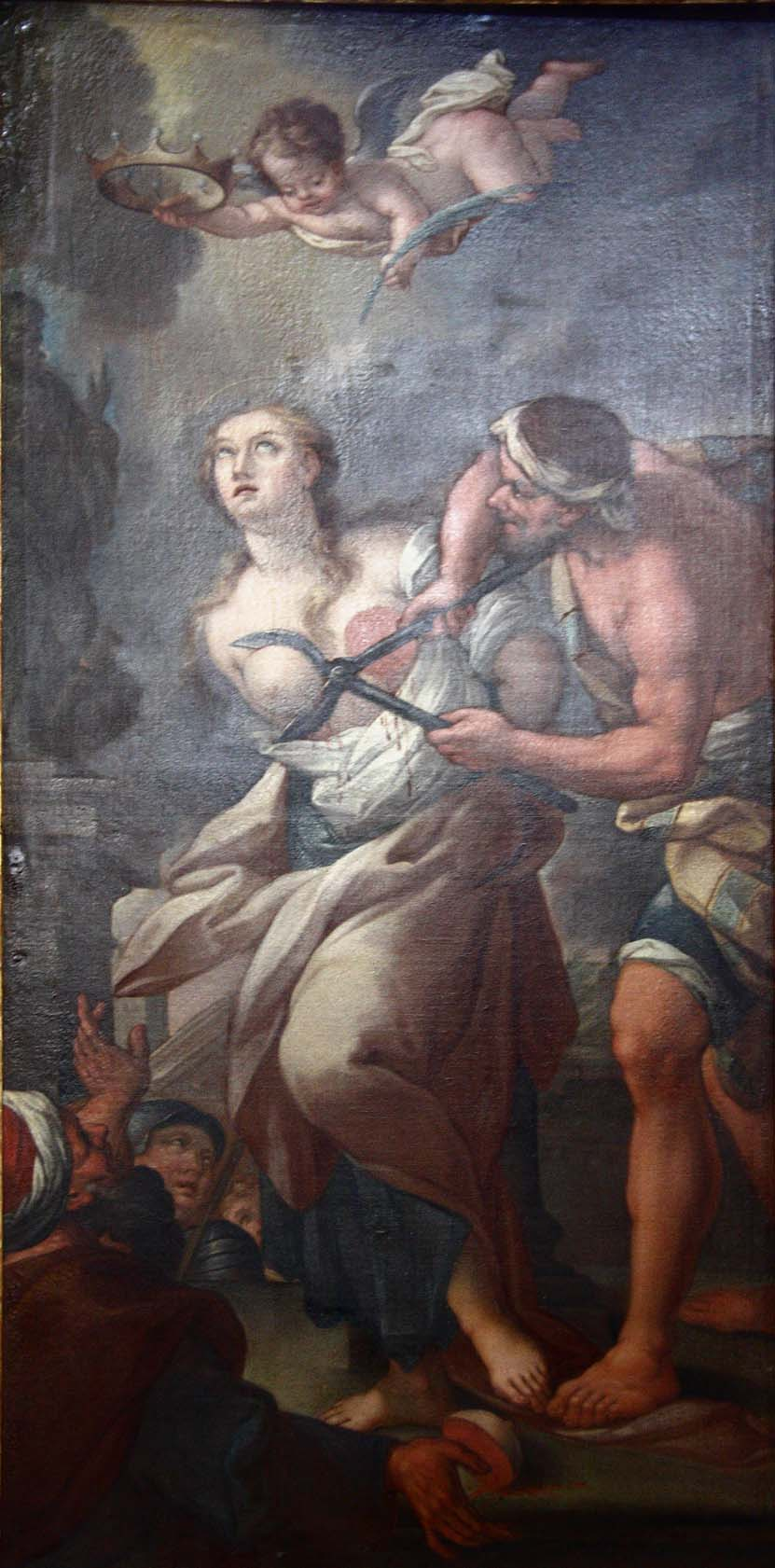
St. Agatha, Cathedral Museum, Victoria, Gozo

Buhagiar was born in Żebbuġ on 17 May 1698. He was the son of the stone carver Pasquale Buhagiar, while his mother was Leonora Buttigieg, originally from Siġġiewi. The family eventually moved to Malta's capital Valletta.

Buhagiar had a workshop where the fellow painter Francesco Zahra probably began his training. Buhagiar and Zahra were close friends, and the latter's early work was heavily inspired from the former, such that their style was almost indistinguishable and that some works attributed to Zahra might actually be Buhagiar's. For example, The Holy Family with God the Father at the Tarxien parish church was formerly widely attributed to both artists but is now regarded as being Buhagiar's work.

He married Anna Maria Cachia on 14 February 1719, and they had three children: Maria, Eleonora and Ferdinando, with the latter becoming a priest. Buhagiar died in Valletta on 21 March 1752 and was buried inside the Carmelite Church.

== Works ==
Works attributed to Buhagiar can be found in a number of churches and chapels around the Maltese Islands. His paintings include Our Lady of Charity (1738) at the Żebbuġ parish church and Our Lady of the Rosary at the Żejtun parish church. Other works may be found in St John's Co-Cathedral in Valletta, the parish churches of Cospicua, Għarb, Għaxaq, Mqabba, Naxxar, Senglea, Siġġiewi, Victoria and Żabbar, in the Inquisitor's Palace in Birgu, and in a number of other churches in Malta and Gozo.
