= Francesco Zahra =

Maltese painter (1710–1773)

Francesco Vincenzo Zahra
- Franġisk Żahra
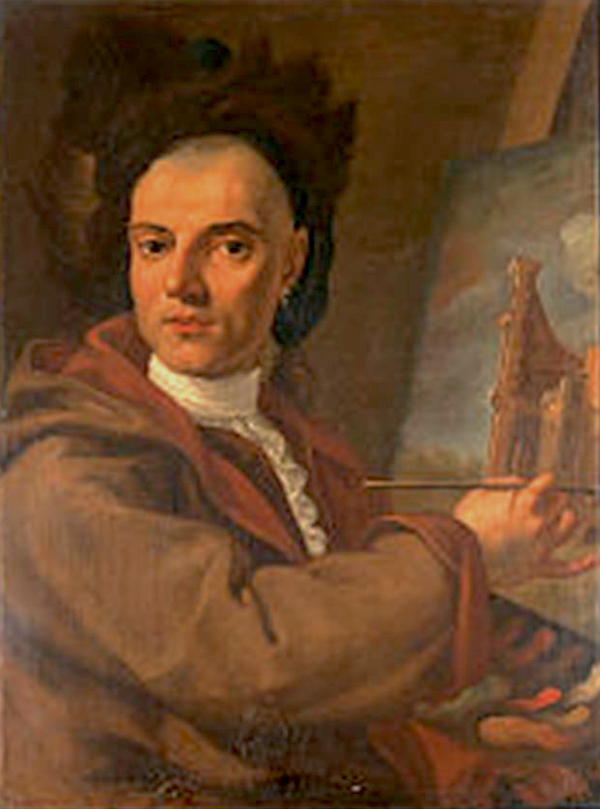
- Born: Senglea, Hospitaller Malta
- Baptised: 15 December 1710
- Died: 19 August 1773 (aged 62); Hospitaller Malta
- Occupation: Painter
- Style: Baroque
- Spouse: Teresa Fenech (m. 1743; died 1751)
- Children: 5
- Parents: Pietro Paolo Zahra (father); Augustina Casanova (mother)

Francesco Vincenzo Zahra (Maltese: Franġisk Żahra, 15 December 1710 – 19 August 1773) was a Maltese painter who mainly painted religious works in the Neapolitan Baroque style. His works may be found in many churches around the Maltese Islands, as well as in some private collections and museums. He is considered to be the greatest painter from 18th-century Malta.

== Biography ==
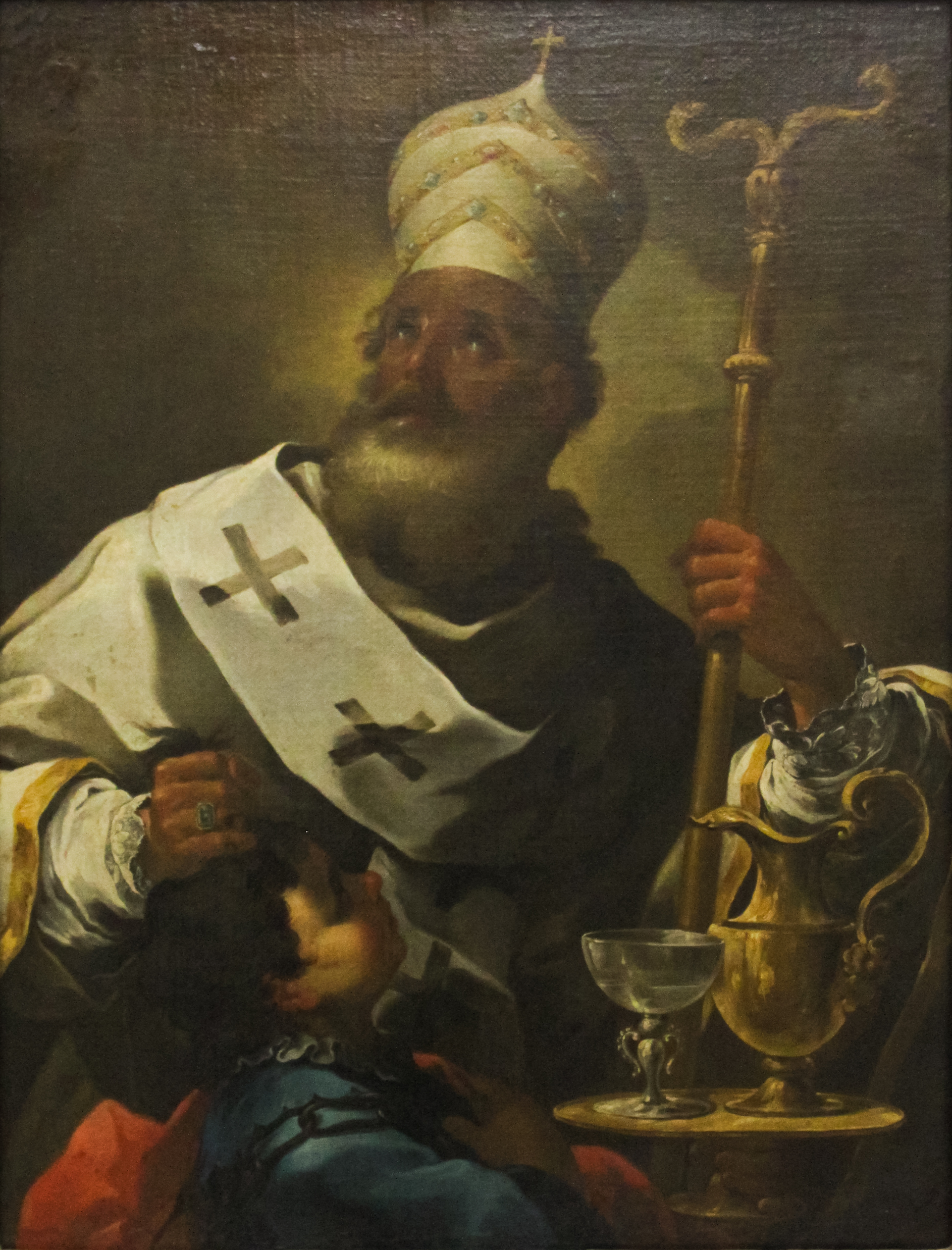
St Nicholas of Myra, National Museum of Fine Arts, Valletta

Zahra was born in Senglea, as the son of the stone carver Pietro Paolo Zahra and Augustina Casanova. His exact date of birth is not known, but he was baptised at the Senglea parish church on 15 December 1710. Little is known of Zahra's early life, but he likely received a good education.

Zahra's career as an artist lasted for four decades, and he came to be considered as the greatest painter from Malta of the 18th century. He painted in the Baroque style and was strongly influenced from the art scene of Naples. Zahra's works include many religious paintings, including altarpieces or other large paintings for churches, vault murals and devotional paintings for private commissions. He is also responsible for a number of portraits, drawings for reredoses, some furniture in churches and works in marble.

He probably began to paint at a young age, and he likely trained at Gio Nicola Buhagiar's workshop in the 1730s. By around 1740, his style began to mature and develop further than that of his tutor Buhagiar. Zahra became the most prolific Maltese painter by around 1745, being rivaled by the French artist Antoine de Favray who at that time worked in Malta. Zahra's style further developed over the years, and in around the mid-1750s his figures and the atmosphere of his paintings had changed, showing influences from Mattia Preti and Favray himself.

Zahra's first significant commission came in 1732, when he painted an altarpiece depicting Three Dominican Saints Adoring the Holy Name of Jesus for the Church of Santa Maria della Grotta in Rabat. His most significant work includes the paintings on the ceiling of the Chapter Hall of the Mdina Cathedral, which were done in 1756.

Zahra moved from his hometown Senglea to the capital Valletta. He was married to Teresa Fenech from 26 February 1743 until her premature death on 27 May 1751. They had five children together, three of whom survived infancy. Zahra died on 19 August 1773 at the age of 62.

== Works ==
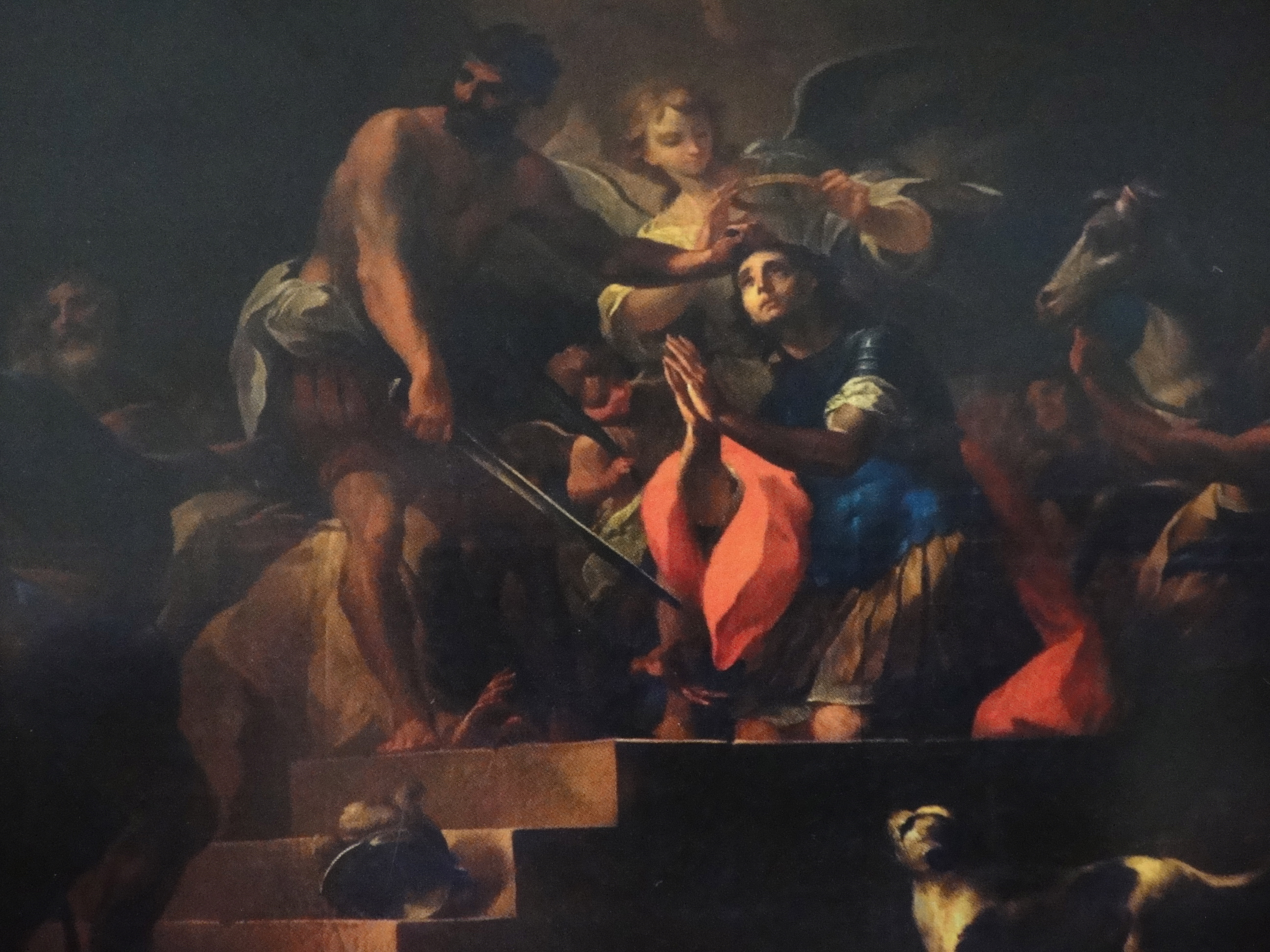
Beheading of St George (1763), St. George's Basilica, Victoria, Gozo

Zahra's works can be found in many churches throughout the Maltese Islands, as well as in private collections and museums. Works by Zahra are located in St. Paul's Cathedral, Mdina, the Cathedral of the Assumption, Victoria, the parish churches of Attard, Balzan, Birkirkara, Floriana, Għarb, Għargħur, Għaxaq, Gudja, Lija, Marsaxlokk, Mosta, Naxxar, Qormi, Rabat, Senglea, Siġġiewi, Sliema, Tarxien, Valletta, Victoria, Xagħra, Xewkija, Żabbar, Żebbuġ, Żejtun and Żurrieq, along with numerous other churches and chapels.

Some works are found at the National Museum of Fine Arts in Valletta and the Wignacourt Museum in Rabat.
