= Gerada =

Gerada is a surname. Notable people with the surname include:

- Clare Gerada (born 1959), British-Maltese physician
- Emanuele Gerada (1920–2011), Maltese Roman Catholic prelate
- Mariano Gerada (1766–1823), Maltese sculptor
- Simon Gerada (born 1981), Australian-Maltese table tennis player
- Jorge Rodriguez-Gerada (born 1966), Cuban American artist
