= Malta Police Force Band =

Maltese Police Force musical band

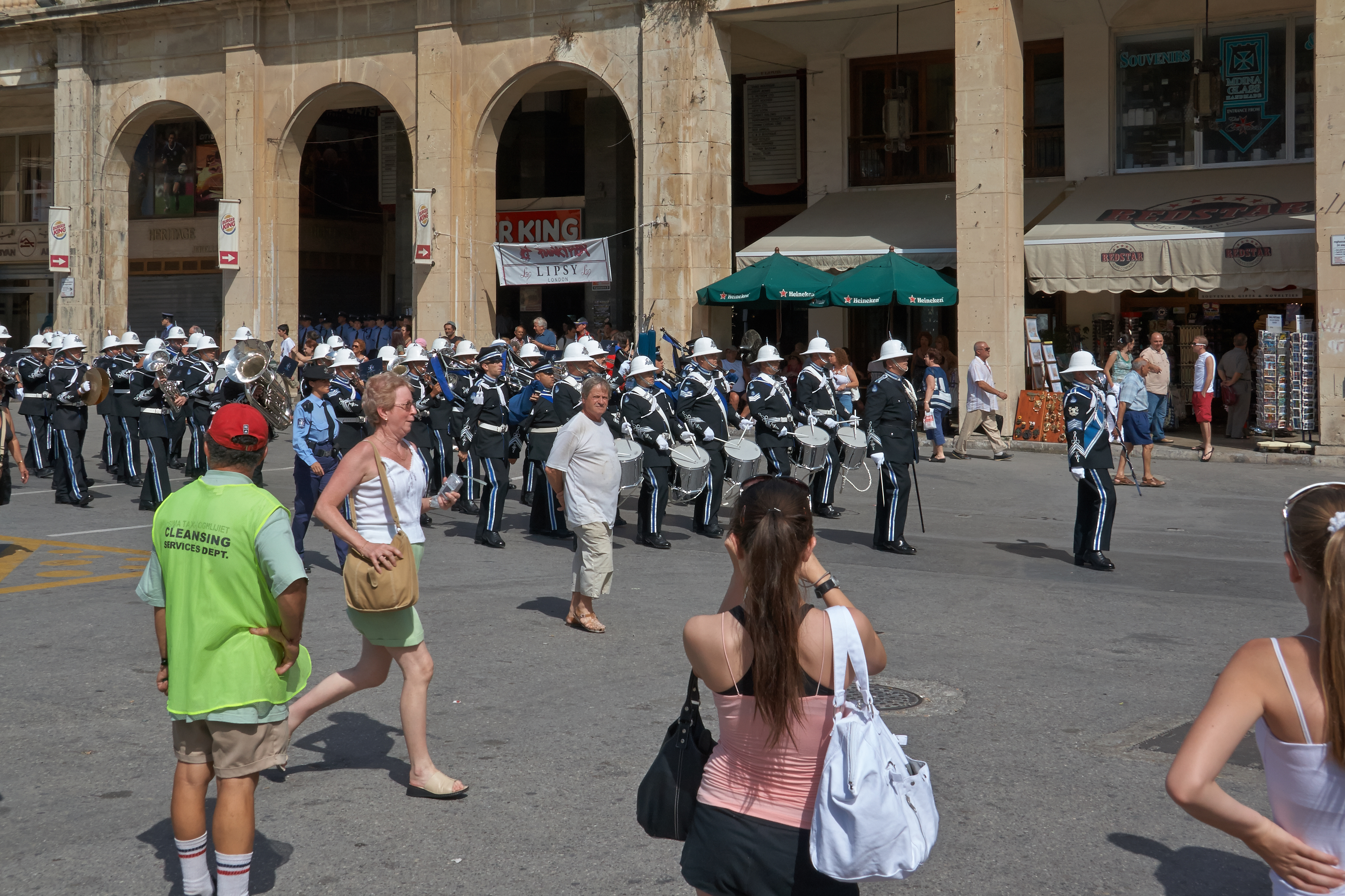
Malta Police Force Band parade in Freedom Square, Valletta in 2008

The Malta Police Force Band is the premier police band in the Republic of Malta, consisting of 35-50 policemen. It was established in 1920 by the local Commissioner of Police, Lieutenant Colonel Henry William Bamford and consisted of bandsmen from The King's Own Malta Regiment and the Royal Malta Artillery. It was under the direction of Mro. E. Magro, who was former the director of the Commander-in-Chief Orchestra. The band has been disbanded several times and was last reactivated in 1994 for the MPF's 180th anniversary. In 2004, a dance ensemble was established in the band and two years later, a pipe band was introduced. Today, the regular band and the pipe band perform jointly. The current director, Senior Police Inspector Anthony Cassar (Assistant Commissioner of Police since 25 September 2018), was appointed to his current position in 1986 and is the fifth to serve in this position since 1920.

In December 1999, the band participated in a massed-band display for the first time with the Armed Forces of Malta Band, to mark the country's 25th anniversary. Since 2004, the band has participated in the Malta Military Tattoo as one of four units representing the home nation. Outside the country, the band has also had the opportunity many other countries, particularly Italy and the United Kingdom. Between 2002 and 2011, the band has released three CDs that consist of pieces ranging from traditional military marches to classical music. Band rehearsals are held after hours at the Ta' Kandja Police Complex.

== See also ==
- Armed Forces of Malta Band
