= Public holidays in Malta =

Malta is the country with the most holidays in the European Union. Since 2020, any holidays falling on Saturdays or Sundays add an extra day to the workers' leave pool, reverting to the pre 2005 system.

== National holidays ==
- 31 March: Freedom Day (Jum il-Helsien)
- 7 June: Sette Giugno
- 8 September: Victory Day (Jum il-Vitorja)
- 21 September: Independence Day (Jum l-Indipendenza)
- 13 December: Republic Day (Jum ir-Repubblika)

== Public holidays ==
- 1 January: New Year's Day ('L-Ewwel tas-Sena')
- 10 February: Feast of Saint Paul's Shipwreck in Malta ('Nawfraġju ta' San Pawl')
- 19 March: Feast of Saint Joseph ('San Ġużepp')
- Friday before Easter: Good Friday ('Il-Ġimgħa l-Kbira')
- 1 May: Workers' Day ('Jum il-Haddiem')
- 29 June: Feast of Saint Peter; Saint Paul, patron saints ('L-Imnarja')
- 15 August: Feast of the Assumption of Our Lady ('Santa Marija')
- 8 December: Feast of the Immaculate Conception ('Il-Kunċizzjoni')
- 25 December: Christmas Day ('Il-Milied')

== Traditional Feasts ==
The following is a list of feasts or special days celebrated in Malta. Note that, with the exception of the dates mentioned in the previous section, these feasts are not public holidays and on these days, business runs as usual across the Maltese islands. As Malta is largely Roman Catholic, most of these feasts celebrate Saints or events from the Holy Bible.

=== January ===
January is known by the Maltese as ix-xahar tal-bard ('the month of the cold')

- 1 January: New Year's Day (L-Ewwel tas-Sena or L-Istrina)
- First Sunday after 1 January: Epiphany (Epifanija or It-Tre Re)
- 13 January: Saint Anthony the Abbot (San Anton Abbati) in Rabat
- 25 January: Conversion of Saint Paul (Konverżjoni ta' San Pawl) in Mdina

=== February ===
February is known by the Maltese as 'ix-xahar ta' San Pawl' ('Saint Paul's month')

- 2 February: Candlemas ('Gandlora')
- 3 February: Saint Blase ('San Blas')
- 10 February: Saint Paul's Shipwreck ('San Pawl Nawfragu') in Valletta, Marsalforn and Munxar
- 14 February: Saint Valentine ('San Valentinu')

=== March ===
March is known by the Maltese as 'ix-xahar ta' San Ġużepp, tal-Lunzjata u tar-roħs' ('The month of Saint Joseph, the Annunciation and Sales')

- 19 March: Saint Joseph ('San Ġużepp') in Rabat
- 25 March: Annunciation ('Il-Lunzjata')
- 27 March: Jesus of Nazareth ('Ġesù Nazzarenu') in Sliema
- 31 March: Freedom Day ('Jum il-Ħelsien')

=== April ===
April is known by the Maltese as 'ix-xahar tan-nwhar u ta' San Girgor' ('the month of blossoms and Saint Gregory').

- 1 April: April Fool's Day ('Il-Ġifa')
- First Wednesday after Easter Sunday: Saint Gregory ('San Girgor')
- 6 April: Saint Publius ('San Publju') in Floriana
- 23 April: Saint George ('San Ġorġ') in Qormi and Victoria

The following feasts are moveable, as they can occur either in March or in April.

- Friday before Palm Sunday – Our Lady of Sorrows ('Id-Duluri')
- Palm Sunday ('Ħadd il-Palm')
- Good Friday ('Il-Ġimgħa l-Kbira')
- Easter ('L-Għid' or 'L-Irxoxt')

=== May ===
May is known by the Maltese as 'ix-xahar tal-ħsad u tal-Madonna ta' Pompej' ('the month of harvest and Our Lady of Pompeii')

- 1 May: Saint Joseph the Worker (www.sanguzepphaddiem.com 'San Ġużepp Ħaddiem' or 'Jum il-Ħaddiem') with a feast in Ħamrun and Birkirkara
- 2 May: Our Lady of Liesse ('Il-Madonna ta' Liesse') in Valletta
- 3 May: Feast of the Cross ('Santu Kruċ') in Birkirkara; St. Augustine ('Santu Wistin') in Valletta
- 9 May: Liturgical Feast of Saint George Preca ('San Ġorġ Preca')
- 31 May: Holy Trinity ('Trinità Mqaddsa') in Marsa
- 22 May: Saint Rita ('Santa Rita') in Valletta
- 24 May: The Annunciation ('Il-Lunzjata') in Tarxien
- 24 May: Saint Paul ('San Pawl') in Munxar
- 24 May: Saint Joseph ('San Ġużepp') in Għaxaq
- 31 May: Saint Anthony of Padua ('Sant' Antnin ta' Padova') in Birkirkara
- Second Sunday of May: Mother's Day ('Jum l-Omm')

=== June ===
June is known by the Maltese as 'ix-xahar tad-dris, tal-ħġejjeġ, tal-Imnarja, u tal-Qalb ta' Ġesù' ('the month of reaping, bonfires, Saint Peter and Saint Paul, and the Sacred Heart of Jesus')

- First Sunday of June: Saint Joseph ('San Ġużepp') in Għaxaq
- 2 June: Our Lady of Fatima ('Il-Madonna ta' Fatima') in Pietà, Malta
- 9 June: Saint Jack
- 21 June: Christ the Redeemer ('Kristu Redentur') in Senglea
- 14 June: Saint Philip ('San Filep') in Żebbuġ, Malta
- 14 June: Corpus Christi in Għasri; Sacred Heart of Jesus ('Il-Qalb ta' Ġesù') in Fontana, Gozo
- 21 June: Our Lady of Lily ('Il-Madonna tal-Ġilju') in Mqabba; Saint Catherine ('Santa Katarina') in Żejtun; Saint John the Baptist ('San Ġwann Battista') in Xewkija
- 22 June: Our Lady of Lourdes ('Il-Madonna ta' Lourdes') in Qrendi
- Third Sunday of June: Father's Day ('Jum il-Missier')
- 29 June: Saint Nicholas ('San Nikola') in Siġġiewi; Our Lady of Sacred Heart ('Il-Qalb Bla Tebgħa ta' Marija') in Burmarrad; Saint Peter and Saint Paul ('San Pietru u San Pawl: L-Imnarja') in Mdina and Nadur
- Fourth/Last Sunday of June: Saint John ('San Ġwann'); Saint George ('San Ġorġ') in Qormi

=== July ===
July is known by the Maltese as 'ix-xahar tal-Karmnu' ('Our Lady of Mount Carmel's month').

- First Sunday of the month: Sacro Cuor ('Our Lady of the Sacred Heart') in Sliema
- 5 July: The Visitation ('Il-Viżitazzjoni') in Għarb; Saint Paul ('San Pawl') in Rabat; Our Lady of Sacred Heart ('Sacro Cuor') in Sliema; Saint Andrew ('Sant' Andrija'): in Luqa; Our Lady of Lourdes ('Il-Madonna ta' Lourdes') in Qrendi; Our Lady of Mount Carmel in Fleur-de-Lys
- 12 July: Our Lady of Mount Carmel in Fgura
- 13 July: Our Lady of Mount Carmel in Gżira
- 16 July: Our Lady of Mount Carmel ('Il-Madonna tal-Karmnu') in Valletta
- 19 July: Our Lady of Mount Carmel in Mdina and Birkirkara
- 20 July: Our Lady of Sorrows ('Marija Sultana Tal-Martri') in San Pawl Il-Baħar
- 26 July: Our Lady of Mount Carmel in Balluta Bay (San Ġiljan); Saint Anne ('Sant' Anna') in Marsaskala
- Second Sunday of July: Saint Joseph ('San Ġużepp') in Kirkop; the Annunciation ('Marija Annunzjata') in Balzan
- Third Sunday of July: Saint George (San Gorg) in Victoria; Saint Sebastian ('San Bastjan') in Hal Qormi; Sacred Family ('Sagra Familja') in Bidnija
- 27 July: Saint Venera ('Santa Venera') in Santa Venera; Mount Carmel* ('Madonna Tal-Karmnu') in Żurrieq
- Last Sunday of July: Christ the King ('Kristu Re') in Paola, Malta

=== August ===
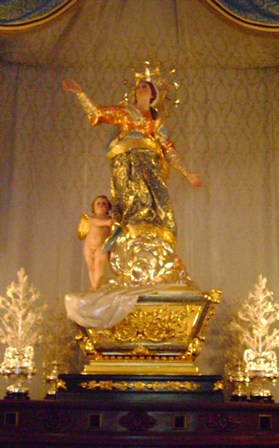
The Assumption of Mary statue by Mariano Gerada, 1808, Għaxaq, Malta

August is known by the Maltese as 'ix-xahar tal-frott, ta' Santa Marija u ta' San Lawrenz' ('the month of fruit, Saint Mary and Saint Lawrence').

- First Sunday of August: Saint Peter in Chains ('San Pietru fil-Ktajjen') in Birżebbuġa
- 10 August: Saint Lawrence ('San Lawrenz') in Birgu and San Lawrenz
- 11 August: Saint Gaetan ('San Gejtanu') in Ħamrun
- 15 August: The Seven Saint Marys ('Is-Seba' Santa Marijiet') in Għaxaq, Mqabba, Qrendi, Gudja, Mosta, Attard and Victoria
- 16 August: Saint Roque ('Santu Rokku')
- Nearest Sunday to 18 August: Saint Helen (Santa Elena): in Birkirkara: Feast celebrated on a Sunday morning
- Third Sunday of August: Stella Maris (Our Lady Star of the Sea) in Sliema
- 29 August: The Martyrdom of Saint John the Baptist ('Il-Martirju ta' San Ġwann')
- Last Sunday of August: Saint Dominic of Guzman ('San Duminku ta' Guzman') in Birgu
- Last Sunday of August: Saint Julian ('San Ġiljan') in San Ġiljan

=== September ===
September is known by the Maltese as 'ix-xahar tal-Vitorja, tal-Bambina, u tal-Grazzja' ('the month of Victory, the Nativity of Our Lady, and Our Lady of Graces').

- 8 September: The Nativity of Our Lady (Il-Bambina) in Mellieħa, Naxxar, Senglea and Xagħra
- First Sunday after 8 September: Our Lady of Graces ('Il-Madonna tal-Grazzja')
- 12 September: The Name of Mary ('L-Isem ta' Marija')
- 21 September: Independence Day ('Jum L-Indipendenza')

=== October ===
October is known by the Maltese as 'ix-xahar tar-Rużarju' ('the month of the Rosary').

- Our Lady of the Rosary ('Il-Madonna tar-Rużarju') different villages in Malta and Gozo celebrate Our Lady of Rosary on different days in October

=== November ===
November is known by the Maltese as 'ix-xahar tal-inżigħ tal-weraq, tal-erwieħ, u tal-imwiet' ('the month of fallen leaves, of souls, and of deaths').

- 2 November: All Souls Day ('L-Għid tal-Erwieħ')
- 11 November: Saint Martin of Tours ('San Martin')
- 22 November: Saint Cecilia ('Santa Ċeċilja')
- 25 November: Saint Catherine of Alexandria ('Santa Katarina ta' Lixandra')
- First Sunday after 25 November: Christ the King ('Kristu Re')

=== December ===
December is known by the Maltese as 'ix-xahar tal-Milied u tal-Kunċizzjoni' ('the month of Christmas and the Conception')

- 8 December: Immaculate Conception in Cospicua
- 13 December: Republic Day ('Jum ir-Repubblika'); Saint Lucy ('Santa Luċija') in Mtarfa
- 25 December: Christmas ('Il-Milied'), with its traditional procession with the statue of Infant Jesus
- 26 December: Saint Stephen ('San Stiefnu')
- 28 December: Innocent Saints ('L-Innoċenti Martri')
- 31 December: Saint Silvester ('San Silvestru')

== Distinction between National and Public Holidays ==
Article 3 of the National Holidays and Other Public Holidays Act (chapter 252) provides the distinction between National and Public Holidays.

The National Holidays shall be public holidays and on those occasions there shall be flown on public buildings the National Flag of Malta.
