= Independence Day (Malta) =

National holiday in Malta

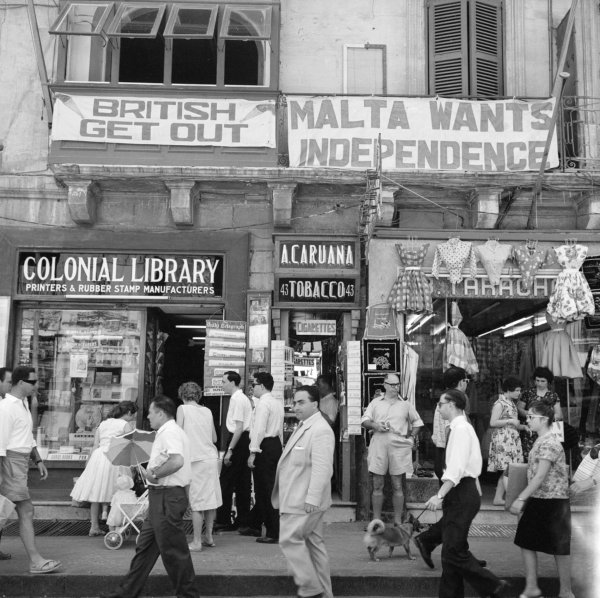
- A view of shops with anti-British and pro-Independence signs
- Official name: Jum l-Indipendenza
- Observed by: Malta
- Type: National
- Significance: Declaring Maltese independence from the United Kingdom
- Date: 21 September
- Next time: 21 September 2026
- Frequency: annual
- Related to: Republic Day and Freedom Day

Independence Day (Maltese: Jum l-Indipendenza) is one of the five national holidays in Malta. It celebrates the day the country gained independence from the United Kingdom on 21 September 1964. Throughout its existence, Malta had a long and complex history which resulted in the island being ruled by a plethora of foreign rulers. Such rulers include the likes of the “Phoenicians, Romans, Greeks, Arabs, Normans, Sicilians, Swabians, Aragonese, Hospitallers, French, and British”. Malta's final ruler, Britain, granted Malta self-governance after Malta's resistance to the Axis powers and loyalty to Britain during World War II, which did allow for the movement for independence to grow more in popularity. Malta attained independence from the British Empire and joined the Commonwealth of Nations in 1964 and declared itself a republic a decade later, known as Republic Day.

== Background ==
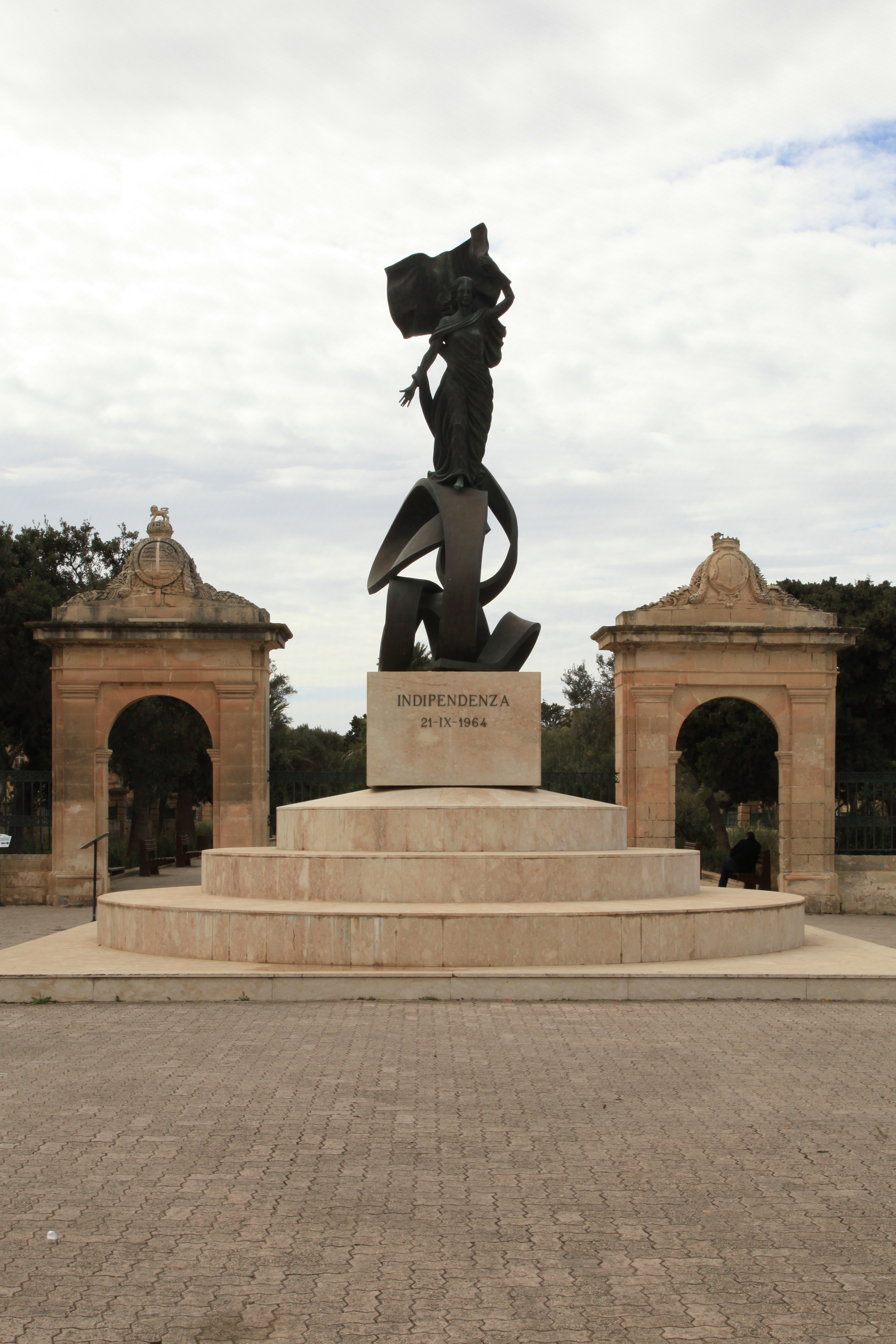
Independence Monument representing Malta liberating herself from shackles of the past while holding onto the national flag

Malta has been an area of interest, for its strategic location in the Mediterranean Sea, since classical times. The island allowed for great international trade and a militarily strategic location, the island was wonderful for navies to stop and rest and it was a great base for military assaults from the air and the sea. The island's longest ruler was the Knights of St. John, who controlled the island for 250 years.

The Knights lost their control of the island after an invasion by French forces led by Napoleon. Napoleon's fleet was en route to invade Egypt and beyond, but needed a place to rest beforehand. Malta refused Napoleon's request to harbour at its islands, but he was not going to let his invasion fail at the fault of the small island-state so he invaded and seized control of the island. While Malta might have been taken through force, the French did not treat them wrongly. France established many reforms that reflected that of the French Revolution, such as ending the remaining feudalistic policies, building and founding many schools, and abolishing slavery. Despite this, the people of Malta saw those policies as excessive for the locals were "largely dominated by [and loyal to] two institutions: the aristocracy and the Church." The Maltese people revolted against the French in response to the policies enacted by France in the occupation of 1799. The French had also been plundering art and national treasures belonging to Malta and taking them back to France, such as the sword belonging to Grandmaster Jean Parisot de la Vallette. During this time, the French had been at war with the British. When the Maltese resistance attempted to retake their capital of Valletta and failed, they turned to Britain for help. Britain accepted Malta's plea for help since France was Britain's nemesis. With famous Admiral Lord Nelson, British forces blockaded the island and took it in 1800. Britain incorporated Malta into their empire, and in 1869, Malta would become famous for its use as a halfway stop between British Gibraltar and the newly opened Suez Canal. The island would then be built up as a fortress and made into the home the British Mediterranean fleet.

A century later would have the Second World War occur. Being the home of the British fleet in the Mediterranean, the Axis powers would try repeatedly to either destroy or control the island. This devastated Malta, but the island never gave in. Their stern resistance against the Nazis and Fascist Italians was rewarded by the British, who both gave the people of Malta the George Cross and promised to give the Maltese people independence. A small amount of local rule was given in 1947, though it wasn't until 21 September 1964 that full independence came. Malta became a republic a decade later and British forces finally left the country after the defence treaty expired on 31 March 1979, which is celebrated as “Freedom Day”.

== See also ==
- Public holidays in Malta
- Independence Day - other Independence Days around the world
- History of Malta and Independence (History of Malta)
