= St Lucy's Chapel, Għaxaq =

Chapel of St Lucy
- The Church of Saint Lucy
- Kappella ta' Santa Luċija tal-Barrani
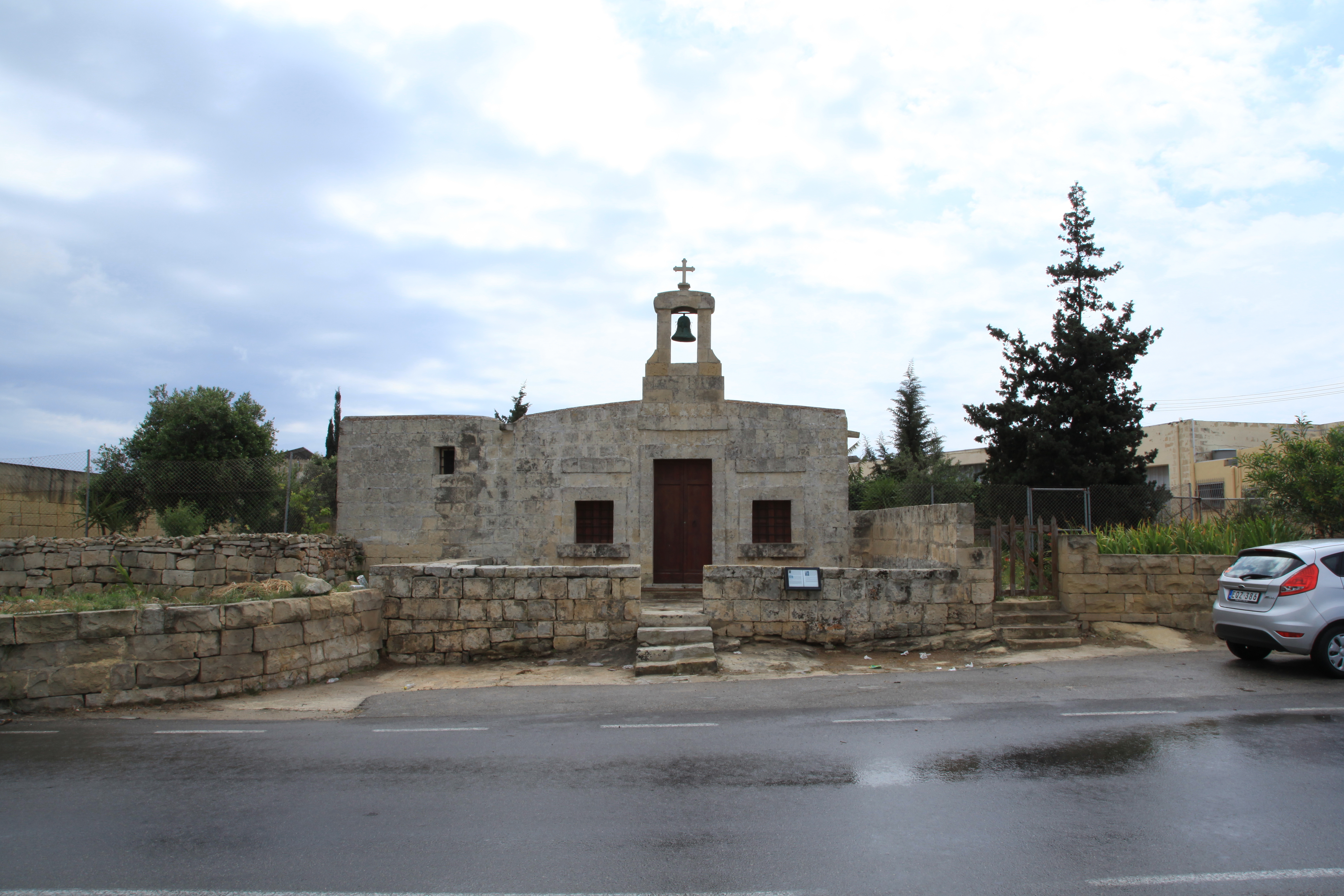
- Chapel of St Lucy
- 35°51′27″N 14°30′42″E
- Location: Għaxaq
- Country: Malta
- Denomination: Roman Catholic

History
- Status: Active
- Founded: 1535
- Dedication: Saint Lucy

Architecture
- Functional status: Church

Administration
- Archdiocese: Malta

Clergy
- Archbishop: Charles Scicluna

The Chapel of St Lucy is a Roman Catholic 16th century chapel located in the outskirts of the village of Għaxaq in Malta. In Maltese, the chapel is known as Santa Luċija tal-Barrani.

== History ==
The chapel was built in 1535 on land owned by the Cathedral chapter through the initiatives of Paolo Pellegrino. In return an honorary canon of the cathedral was obliged to bear the expenses for the celebration of the feast of the saint and to provide alms for the poor on the feast day, a custom that persisted until WWII. The expenses for the construction of the church were seen to by the cathedral chapter with the chapel being administered by the cathedral Precentor. After WWII the chapel was neglected and disused. It was only recently that the chapel was restored and used for worship.

== Interior ==
The chapel has one altar and a painting depicting Saint Lucy and the Virgin Mary. The chapel's interior consists of 3 pointed arches that support the walls and roof, typical of medieval architecture in Malta.
