= Tarxien =

Tarxien Ħal Tarxien
- Local council
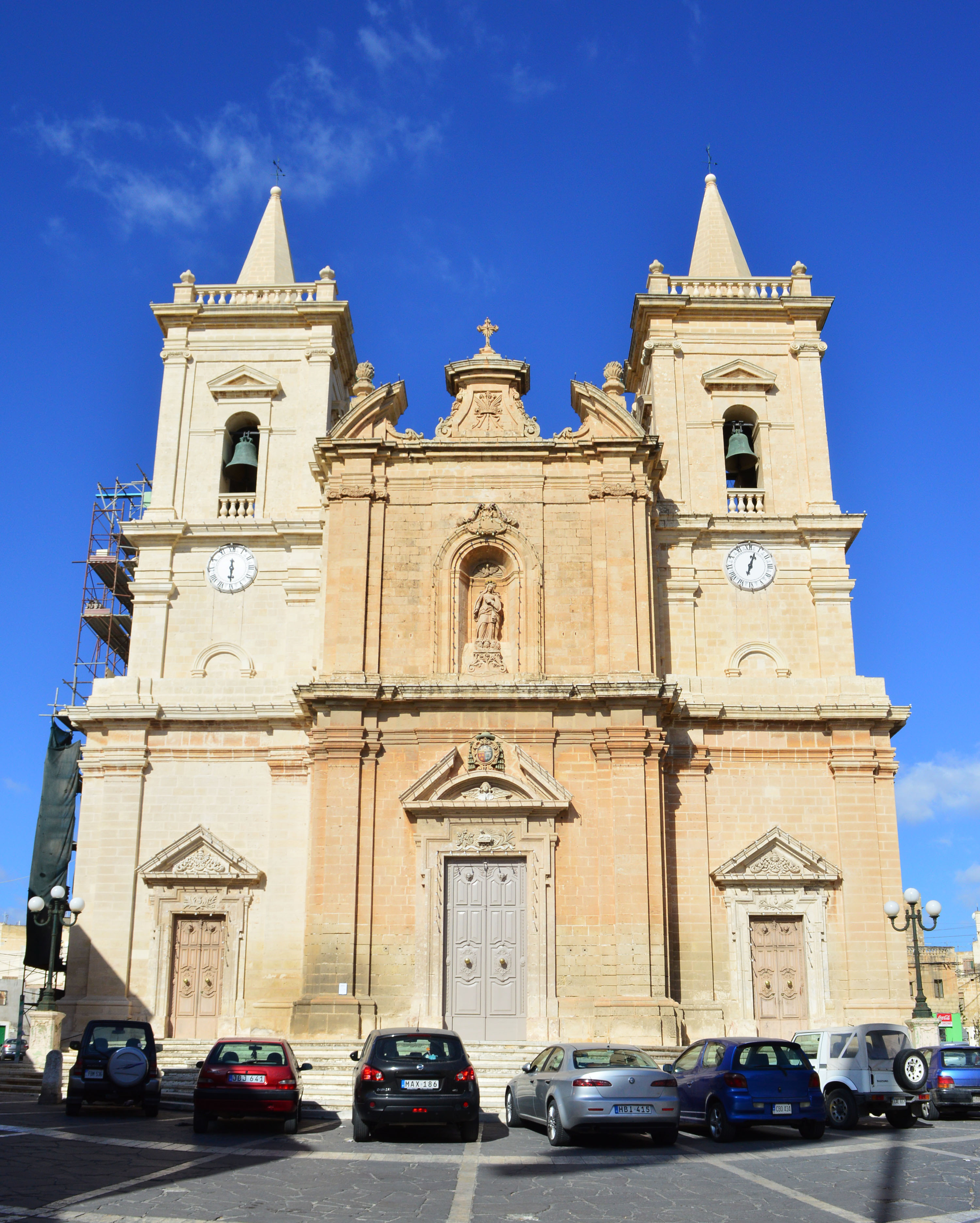
- Tarxien Parish Church

- Flag Coat of arms
- Motto: Tyrii Genure Coloni (The Phoenicians Created Me)
- Coordinates: 35°51′57″N 14°30′43″E
- Country: Malta
- Region: Port Region
- District: Southern Harbour District
- Borders: Fgura, Luqa, Ghaxaq, Paola, Santa Luċija, Żejtun

Government
  - Mayor: Joseph Abela (PL)

Area
  - Total: 0.9 km^{2} (0.35 sq mi)

Population (Jul. 2024)
  - Total: 9,901
  - Density: 11,000/km^{2} (28,000/sq mi)
- Demonym(s): Tarxiniż (m), Tarxiniża (f), Tarxiniżi (pl)
- Time zone: UTC+1 (CET)
  - Summer (DST): UTC+2 (CEST)
- Postal code: TXN
- Dialing code: 356
- ISO 3166 code: MT-59
- Patron saint: Annunciation
- Day of festa: 3rd Sunday of May (Annunciation); 3rd Sunday of July (Our Lady of Doctrine)
- Website: Official website

Tarxien (Maltese: Ħal Tarxien [ˈħɐl tɐrˈʃɪːn]) is a town in the Port region of Malta, seat of the Port Regional Council. Its population stood at 8,583 in March 2014.

The town is most notable for the Tarxien Temples, a megalithic temple complex which is among the oldest freestanding structures on Earth. It forms part of a UNESCO World Heritage Site.

== Etymology ==
The etymology of the village may be a corruption of Tirix, meaning a large stone, similar to those used for the village's noted temples. The village motto is Tyrii Genure Coloni ("The Phoenicians created me").

== Demographics ==
The population of Tarxien was 9,901 in July 2024. This included 5,113 males and 4,788 females; 8,609 Maltese nationals and 1,292 foreign nationals.

Tarxien's population stood at 7,724 villagers in December 2008, which increased to 8,583 by March 2014. When the summer comes, the heat drives most of the citizens of Ħal Tarxien to the seaside villages of Malta, often bringing down the population of the village to about two-thirds of what it is during the colder months.

== Main sights ==
=== Prehistoric temples ===
The Tarxien Temples consist of three separate, but attached, temple structures. The oldest temple here is said to date back to about 3600 BCE. The temples feature various statues and reliefs of animals, including goats (for which Malta is noted) and pigs. Most notable of the statues found in the Temples are about 2.5 m in height, and are said to represent a sort of Mother Goddess. There are several of these statues scattered around the various temples, and are thought to represent fertility. There was also one of three small baked clay figurines in the form of what is said to be a priest that was found here.

=== Churches ===
The parish church of Ħal Tarxien is dedicated to the Annunciation of Our Lady, hence the Tarxinizi (the people of Ħal Tarxien) consider the Blessed Virgin Mary, particularly at Her Annunciation as the Patron and Protector of their town and its whole population. The church was elevated to the status of parish in 1592, making it one of the oldest parishes of Malta. A key part of Ħal Tarxien culture is the feast of the Annunciation, whose feast is celebrated in late May or first Sunday of June. It is celebrated with religious celebrations and liturgical services at the parish church, and publicly with street decorations, band marches in the village streets and large aerial and ground firework displays.

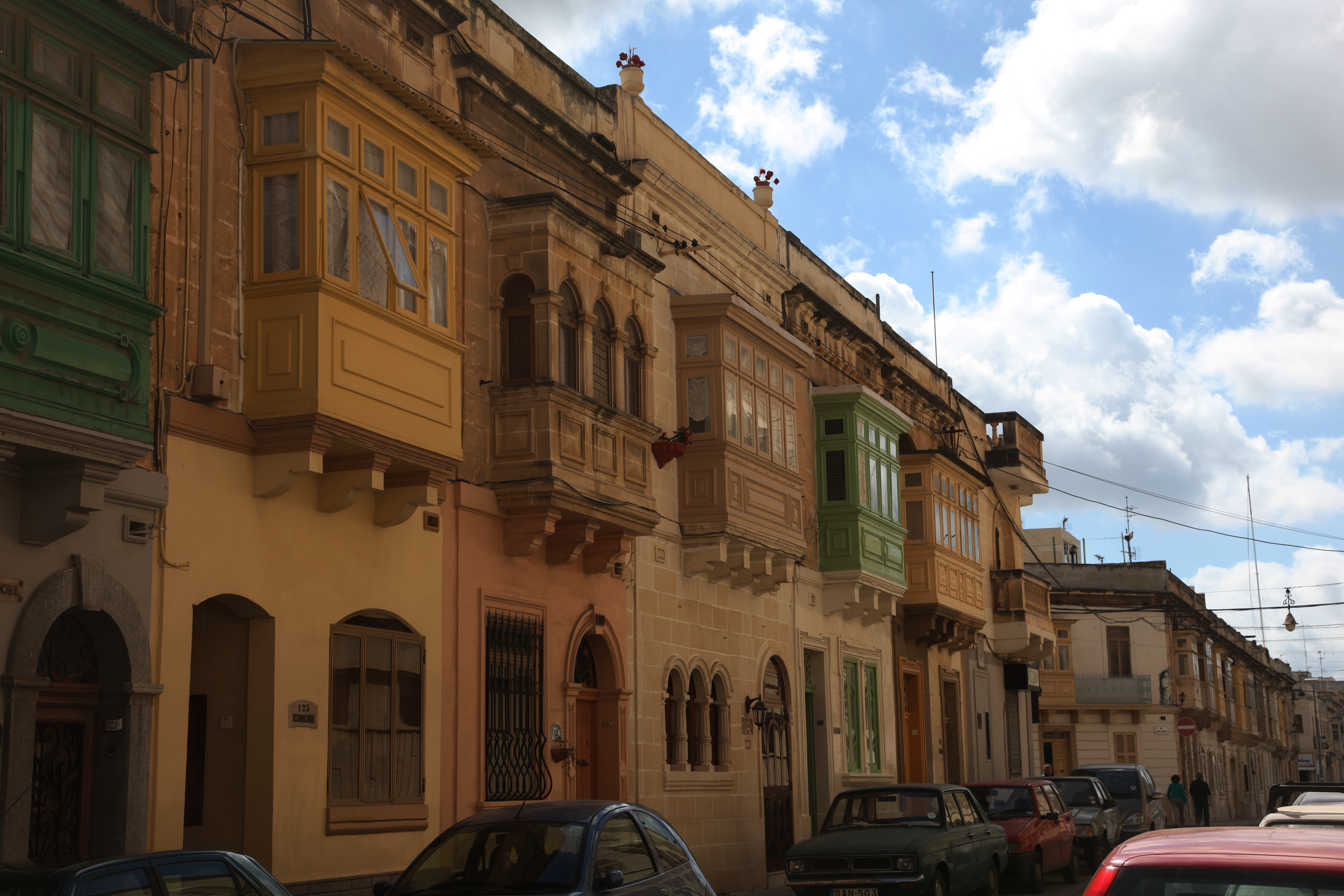
A street in Tarxien

The second largest church in town is dedicated to the Resurrection of Christ better known by the locals as Ta' l-Erwieħ (Maltese pronunciation: [tɐ lɛrˈwɪːħ]). The word means "of the souls" and it is used due to the old cemetery that surrounds the church. This church is right next to the renowned Tarxien Neolithic Temples and is visited by many tourists as many of the prehistoric remains were also found in the mentioned cemetery.

There are two other small chapels in Ħal Tarxien. These are dedicated to St. Bartholomew and St. Mary respectively.

There is also another chapel which is housed in the convent of the Sisters of Charity. This is dedicated to 'Our Lady of the Immaculate Conception'. The same congregation have a school.

There is also another church dedicated to St. Nicholas of Tolentino and a convent which belongs to the Augustinian Friars.

== Local Council ==
The Ħal Tarxien local council members are:

- Joseph Abela Galea (Mayor, PL)
- Darlene Vella (Vice Mayor, PL)
- Dasier D'Amato (PL)
- Neil Portelli (PL)
- Nicole Farrugia (PL)
- Anabelle Marmara (PN)
- Glenn Gerald Urry (PN)

== Band clubs ==
There are two band clubs in Ħal Tarxien. These are the "Għaqda Mużikali Marija Annunzjata" and the "Ghaqda Mużikali Madonna tad-Duttrina", with same clubs seeing their beginnings in 1862 and 1997 respectively. The main aims of these clubs are to promote the music culture amongst the locals of Ħal Tarxien and to co-organise the external festivities of their respective feasts. "Għaqda Mużikali Marija Annunzjata" organises the titular feast of the Annunciation of Our Lady held annually during the last week of May/first week of June, whilst the "Ghaqda Muzikali Madonna tad-Duttrina" organises the secondary feast of the village, that of Our lady of Christian Doctrine held annually in the third week of July.

- The Annunciation Band Club (L-Għaqda Mużikali Marija Annunzjata)
- Our lady of Christian Doctrine Band Club(Ghaqda Muzikali Madonna Tad-Duttrina)

== Fireworks organization ==
- Ghaqda tan-nar San Gabriel
- Sezzjoni Nar Madonna Tad-Duttrina (p/o Ghaqda Muzikali Madonna tad-Duttrina)

== Notable people from Tarxien ==
- Former Prime Minister of Malta Dominic Mintoff lived in Ħal Tarxien and died at his residence there on 20 August 2012.
- Former Minister Magistrate Dr. Joseph Cassar.
- Thea Garrett, singer. She represented Malta at Eurovision Song Contest 2010.

== Twin cities ==
- Ovindoli, Italy
- Veliko Tarnovo, Bulgaria
- Saint-Élix-le-Château, France

== Gallery ==
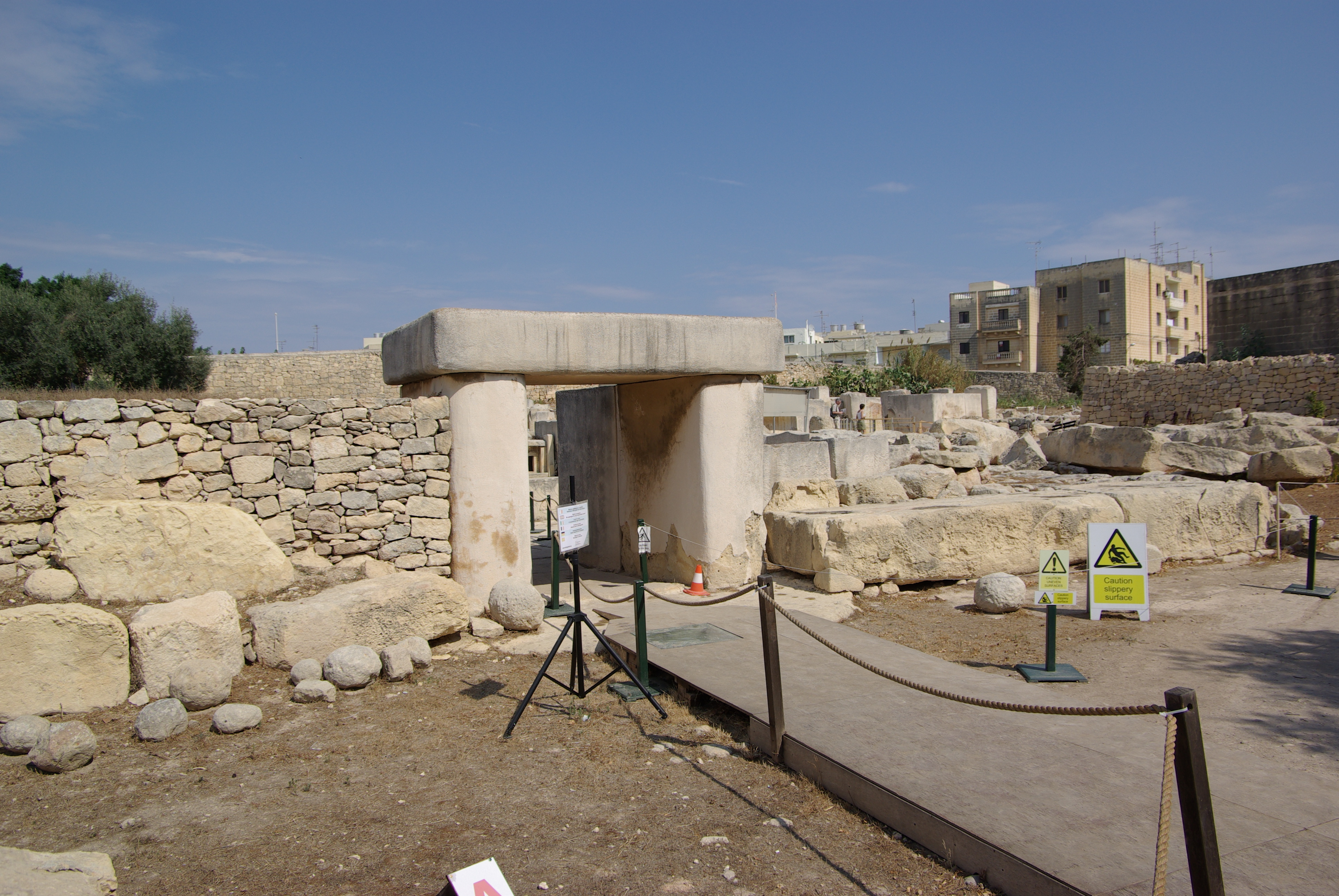
Reconstructed entrance to the temple complex

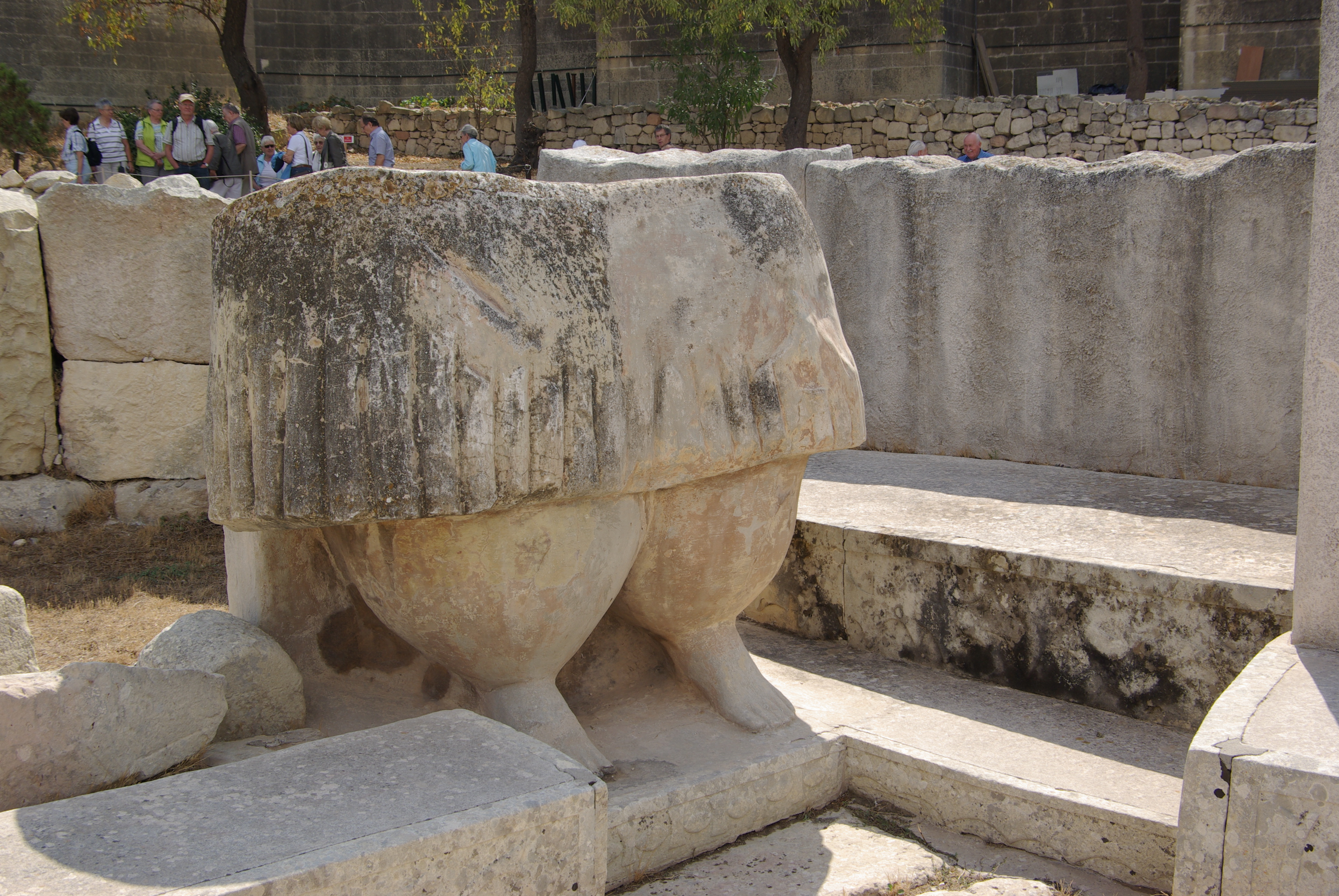
Magna Mater in the Ħal Tarxien Temple

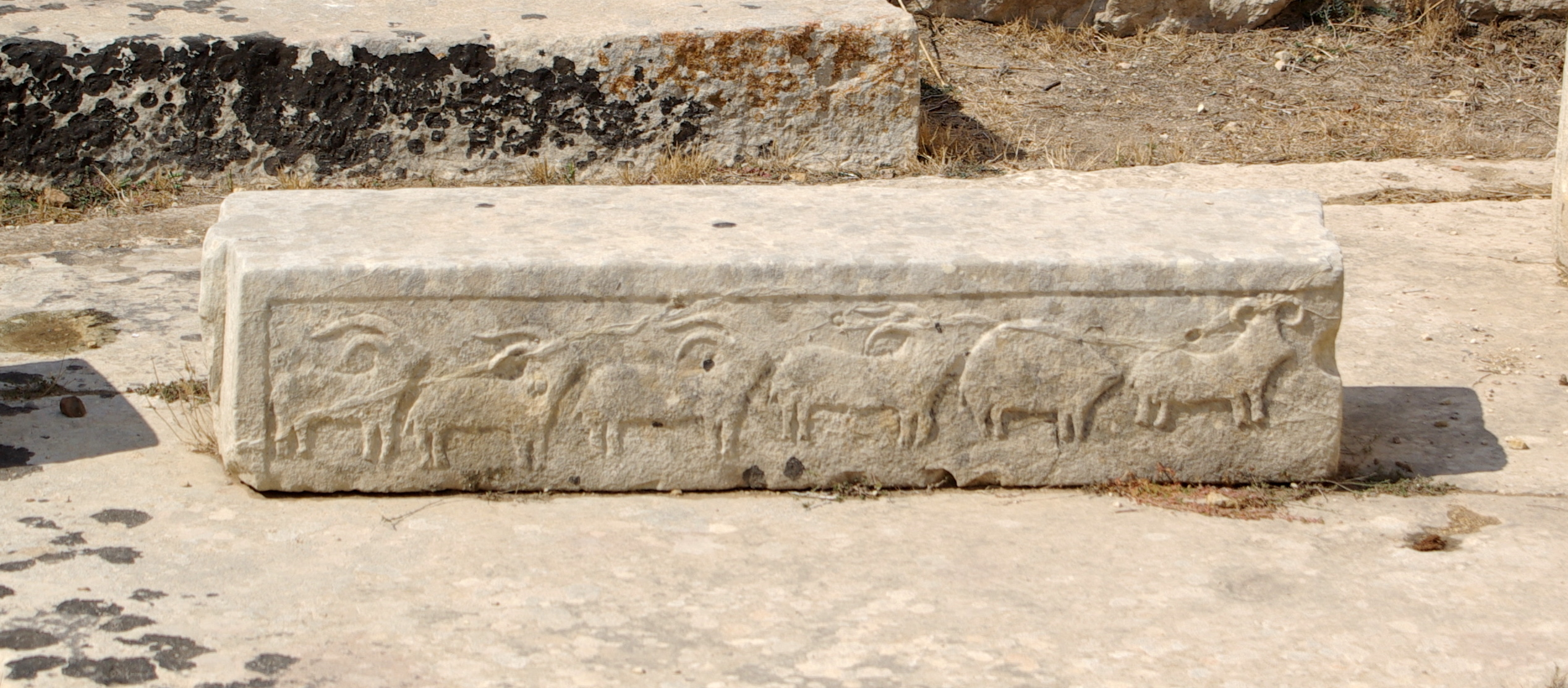
A relief showing goats and rams

== Main roads ==
- Misraħ ir-Repubblika (Republic Square)
- Misraħ is-Suq (Market Square)
- Triq Birżebbuġa (Birzebbuga Road)
- Triq Brittanika (Britannic Street)
- Triq Ħal Tarxien (Tarxien Road)
- Triq id-Dejma (Dejma Street)
- Triq il-Kbira (Main Street)
- Triq il-Palma (Palm Street)
- Triq Paola (Paola Road)
- Triq San Anard (St Leonard Road)
- Triq Santa Marija (St Mary Street)
- Triq Tal-Barrani (Outer Road)
- Triq il-Knisja (Church Street)
- Triq iż-Żejtun (Żejtun Road)
- Triq Marju Schembri (Mario Schembri Street)
