= Republic Day (Malta) =

National holiday of Malta

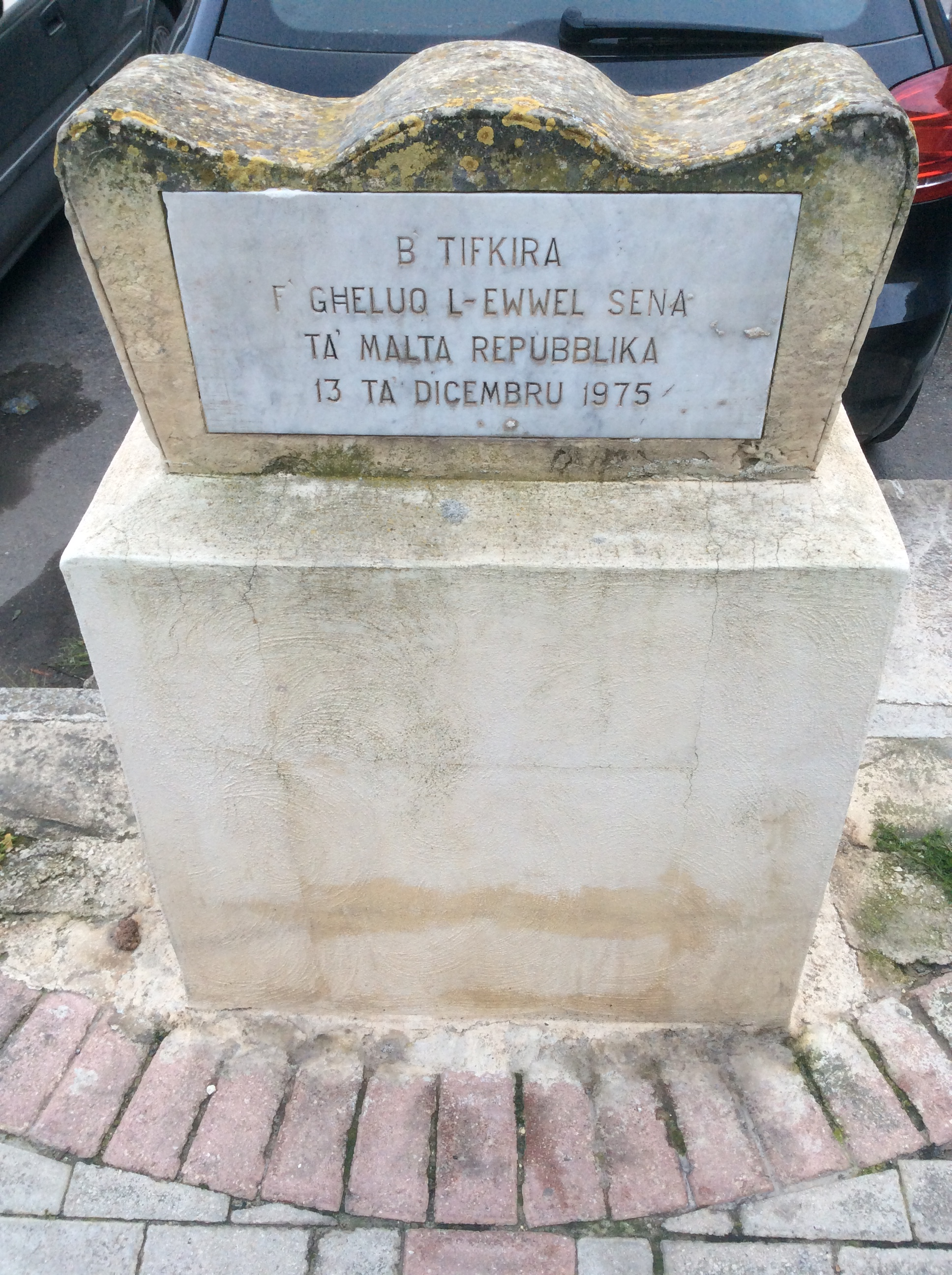
- The Republic Day monument in Zejtun.
- Observed by: Malta
- Significance: Celebrates the transformation of the country to a republic.
- Observances: Military events; Awards ceremonies; Fireworks
- Date: 13 December
- Next time: 13 December 2026
- Frequency: annual

Republic Day (Maltese: Jum ir-Repubblika) is a public holiday celebrated in Malta on 13 December. It celebrates the anniversary of the creation of the Republic of Malta in 1974, and the ending of the role of Elizabeth II as Queen of Malta, under which Sir Anthony Mamo, the last Governor-General, was sworn in as the first President. British troops did not leave the country until 31 March 1979.

== Events on 13 December ==
The main state sponsored celebrations take place in the center of the country's capital, Valletta. The National Festivities Committee is responsible for organizing Republic Day events annually.

=== Awards ceremony ===
The President of Malta usually presents awards to those who have served Malta in the military/political sphere and public figures who are considered to be effective representatives of the country.

=== Fireworks ===
A fireworks display is annually held over the Grand Harbour.

=== Monument ===
A wreath laying ceremony is held at the Republic Day Monument in Marsa. Monuments are also erected during the holiday for wreath laying procedures.

=== Military parade ===
A traditional Trooping the Colour ceremony and parade is the main military event that takes place on the day. The parade takes place in St. George’s Square in Valletta, where the Presidential Colour is trooped through the ranks of the Armed Forces of Malta. The salute is taken by the President of Malta, in their position as the commander in chief of the AFM. It is similar to the British version of the ceremony, with the parade being composed of 1 Colour Escort Guard and 3 other Guard units, accompanied by the Armed Forces of Malta Band. In the march-past, two marches are performed, By Land and Sea (for the march in slow time) and The British Grenadiers (for the march in quick time). At the conclusion of the ceremony, the guards perform a ceremonial Feu de joie.

== See also ==
- Republic Day in other countries
- Public holidays in Malta
- Victory Day (Malta)
- Trooping the Colour

== Links ==
- Republic Day Parade 2018
- Republic Day Parade 2017
- Republic Day Parade 2013
