= Armed Forces of Malta Band =

The Armed Forces of Malta Band (Maltese: Banda tal-Forzi Armati ta' Malta) is a Maltese platoon-sized musical group representing the units of the Armed Forces of Malta (AFM). The AFM Band is a regular participant in official events and ceremonies, mostly performing on major holidays such as Republic Day in December. The band's area of responsibility includes Malta and Gozo. The personnel of the AFM Band makes up the only specialised marching band on the island. The band currently has 44 musicians in its ranks, who, besides their duties as bandsmen, also perform their military duties as medics and security officers.

The band reports directly to the AFM's 4th Regiment.

== History ==
=== Predecessors ===
The AFM Band's precursor was known as the Royal Malta Artillery Band (RMA Band), which was established in 1890 and provided the basis for the AFM Band later on. The RMA Band itself traces its origins to the year 1800, when a band with fifes and drums formed part of the Malta Light Infantry Regiment. During the Second World War, the band was suspended as its members were serving on active-duty missions in mainland Europe. Music was also provided by the Band of the 1st Battalion, The King's Own Malta Regiment, which maintained its own corps of drums alongside a brass and reed band.

=== AFM Band ===
The RMA Band was reactivated in 1943. The AFM Band was established in 1970 by Warrant officer Chircop Anthony. Today, the AFM Band is directed by Captain Mro. Twanny Borg.

== Duties ==
Its repertoire of music ranges from military marches to classical and popular music. Since the 1970s, the AFM Band has been represented at various massed band displays and organized military tattoos sponsored by the AFM, the British Army, and other music organizations. Among these is the Malta Military Tattoo, which is the main participant. In particular, the last decade saw the AFM Band travel to festivals in Germany, Italy, Russia, Libya, Switzerland and Scotland. It also has provided full military honours towards officials such as President George H. W. Bush and General Secretary Mikhail Gorbachev during the Malta Summit of 1989.

== Links ==
- The Power of Military Music
