= Annunciation Church, Tarxien =

Annunciation Church
- The ArchMatrix and ArchParish Church of the Annunciation of Our Lord
- Il-Knisja ArċiMatriċi u ArċiPretali tal-Lunzjata
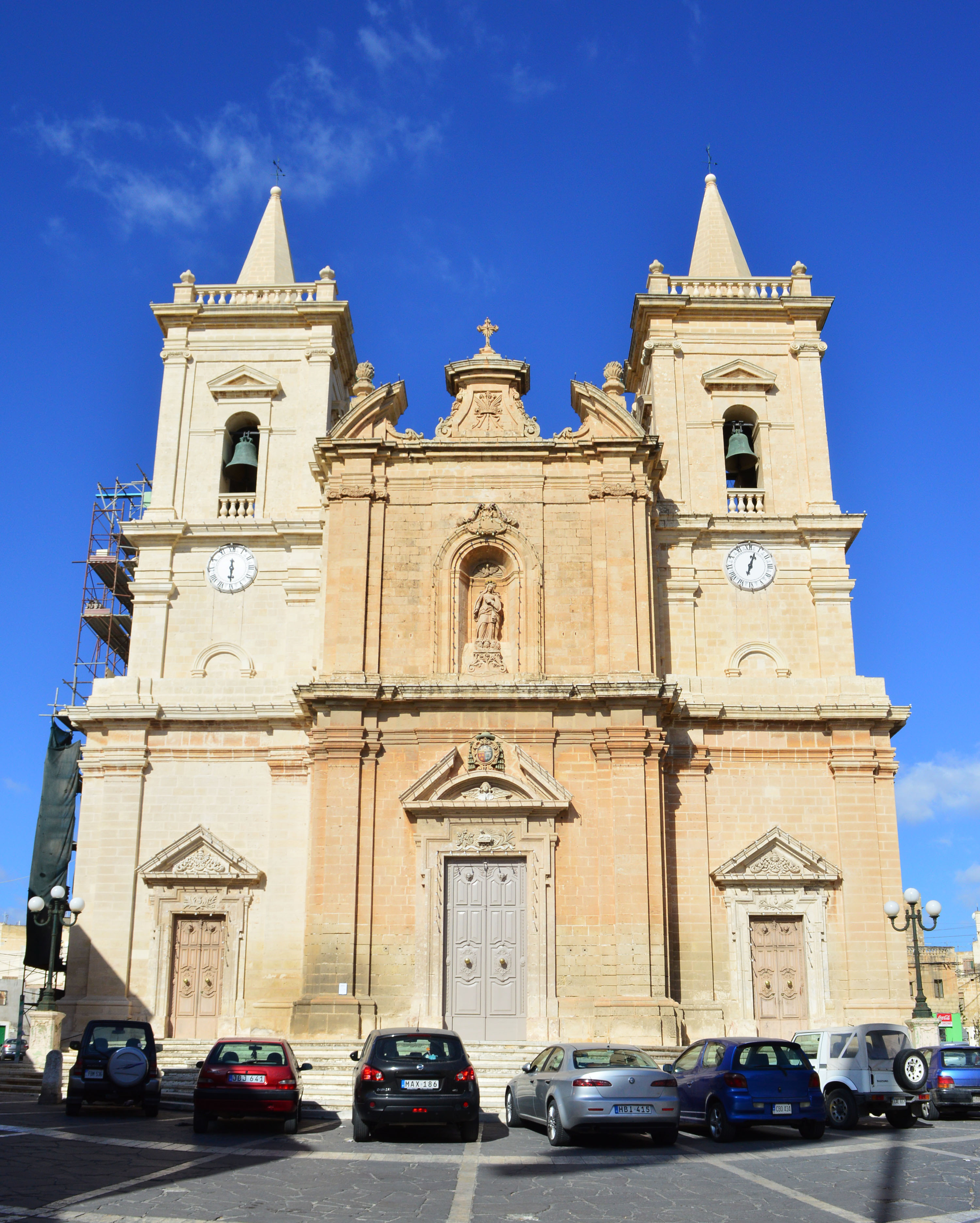
- Annunciation Church
- 35°51′53.9″N 14°30′41.0″E
- Location: Tarxien, Malta
- Denomination: Roman Catholic
- Website: Website of the Church

History
- Status: Active
- Founded: 1610
- Dedication: Annunciation
- Consecrated: 8 May 1782

Architecture
- Functional status: ArchParish church
- Architectural type: Church

Specifications
- Materials: Limestone

Administration
- Archdiocese: Malta
- Parish: Tarxien

The Parish Church of the Annunciation of Our Lord or simply Annunciation Church or in Maltese Il-Knisja tal-Lunzjata is a Roman Catholic Parish church located in the village of Tarxien in Malta.

== History ==
The parish of Tarxien was created on May 29, 1592 by Bishop Tomás Gargallo. Works on the parish church started during the start of the 17th century, the traditional date being May 5, 1610. The church was built on the site of 3 respective chapels. It was recorded that by 1621 the construction was still in progress and that in 1627 works on the architecture was completed. By 1636 the church had two spires. In 1740 the side chapels were built, three on each side of the church. During the 18th century the church underwent extensive changes in its structure and architecture especially in its facade. The church was consecrated on May 8, 1782.

== Interior ==
There are a total of 11 side altars in their respective chapels and one high altar dedicated to the Annunciation of Jesus. The high altar, which was in use prior to the changes brought by the Second Vatican Council, is made of marble and is the work of Antonio Nikolas of Senglea. The high altar was blessed on October 19, 1779. The titular painting depicting the Annunciation is the work of Pietro Gagliardi dating from 1874.

== See also ==
- Catholic Church in Malta
