= St Mary's Church, Għaxaq =

Parish Church of the Assumption of Mary
- Knisja Parrokkjali tal-Assunzjoni ta' Santa Marija
- Parish Church of the Assumption of Mary
- Location: Għaxaq
- Country: Malta
- Denomination: Roman Catholic
- Website: https://ghaxaq.knisja.mt

History
- Status: Parish church
- Dedication: Assumption of Mary
- Consecrated: 2 May 1784

Architecture
- Functional status: Active
- Architect: Sebastian Saliba
- Architectural type: Church
- Style: Baroque
- Groundbreaking: 1723
- Completed: c. 1760

Specifications
- Materials: Limestone

Administration
- Archdiocese: Malta
- Parish: Għaxaq

Clergy
- Priest: Dun Anton D'Amato

The Parish Church of the Assumption of Mary (Maltese: Knisja Parrokkjali tal-Assunzjoni ta' Santa Marija) is a Roman Catholic Baroque parish church located in Għaxaq, Malta. Dedicated to the Assumption of Mary, it serves as the principal place of worship for the locality and is a prominent example of 18th-century Maltese ecclesiastical architecture.

== History ==
=== Early church and parish foundation ===
The earliest recorded reference to a church in Għaxaq dates to 1511, when an episcopal visitation conducted by Monsignor Pietro Dusina documented a church dedicated to the Assumption of Saint Mary.

Għaxaq was formally established as a parish on 22 April 1626, at which point the existing church assumed parochial functions.

A larger church was constructed by 1655 to accommodate the growing population, though further enlargements continued in subsequent decades.

=== Construction of the present church ===
By the early 18th century, the existing structure was considered inadequate, prompting the construction of a new parish church. The foundation stone of the present building was laid in 1723, and construction progressed over several decades.

The church was designed by the Maltese architect magister architectus Sebastian Saliba (1709–1782). The main structural works were largely completed by around 1760.

The church was solemnly consecrated on 2 May 1784.

=== Later developments ===
During the 18th century, the bell towers and clock mechanisms were installed, reflecting developments in ecclesiastical timekeeping.

In the 19th and 20th centuries, the church underwent further decorative enrichment and restoration, including artistic additions and maintenance works.

The building is listed as a Grade 1 national monument by Maltese cultural heritage authorities.

== Architecture ==
The church is built in the Baroque style characteristic of 18th-century Maltese parish churches. The façade is symmetrically composed and articulated with pilasters and entablatures.

A forecourt and staircase lead to the main entrance, which is framed by decorative architectural elements. The façade is flanked by two bell towers rising from ground level.

The interior follows a Latin cross plan and is crowned by a central dome over the crossing. The structure is constructed primarily from local limestone.

== Artworks and furnishings ==
The church houses a significant collection of sacred art reflecting both local and foreign artistic traditions.

The titular statue of the Assumption, carved in wood by Mariano Gerada in 1808, is among its most important devotional objects.

The statue of Our Lady of the Rosary, carved in wood by Xandru Farrugia in 1823, is another notable work. Farrugia was a pupil of Mariano Gerada, reflecting the continuity of local sculptural traditions in early 19th-century Malta.

Additional works include sculptures by the Milanese firm Fratelli Bertarelli (1932) and Maltese artists such as Carlo Darmanin and the Camilleri Cauchi family.

The church also contains paintings by prominent Maltese artists, including Francesco Zahra, Gio Nicola Buhagiar, and Rokku Buhagiar, as well as later works by Emvin Cremona.

== Confraternities ==
The parish church hosts a number of confraternities which play an important role in its religious and social life.

The Confraternity of the Most Holy Sacrament (Maltese: Fratellanza tas-Santissimu Sagrament) is the oldest confraternity associated with the parish and has historically been responsible for organising Eucharistic devotion and related liturgical functions.

The Confraternity of the Most Holy Rosary (Maltese: Fratellanza tar-Rużarju) is traditionally regarded as the wealthiest confraternity within the parish and is closely associated with Marian devotion, particularly the veneration of Our Lady of the Rosary.

The Confraternity of Saint Joseph (Maltese: Fratellanza ta' San Ġużepp), established in 1750, is the most recent confraternity within the parish and is associated with devotion to Saint Joseph and related liturgical celebrations.

The Confraternity of Our Lady of Sorrows (Maltese: Fratellanza tal-Madonna tad-Duluri) is associated with devotion to the Virgin Mary under the title of Our Lady of Sorrows and plays a prominent role in the processions held during the Lenten period, particularly those connected with Holy Week observances.

== Religious and cultural significance ==
The parish church is central to the religious life of Għaxaq. The titular feast of the Assumption, celebrated annually on 15 August, is one of the principal village feasts in Malta and includes liturgical celebrations, processions, and traditional festivities.

In addition to the titular feast, the parish plays an active role in Holy Week celebrations. On Palm Sunday, a solemn procession is held featuring statues representing episodes from the Passion of Christ, symbolising his journey towards the Crucifixion.

In 2026, a new wooden statue depicting the Risen Christ, carved by Alfred and Aaron Camilleri Cauchi, was introduced and took part for the first time in the Easter Sunday procession held on 5 April 2026, marking a recent development in the parish’s liturgical and devotional traditions.

Other important processions held by the parish include that of Our Lady of the Most Holy Rosary, which takes place on the second Sunday of October, and the procession of Saint Joseph, held on the first Sunday of June.

== See also ==
- Catholic Church in Malta
- List of churches in Malta
