= Church of the Nativity of Mary, Naxxar =

Church of the Nativity of Mary
- The Matrix Parish church of the Nativity of Mary
- Il-knisja Arċipretali u Matriċi tat-Twelid ta' Marija
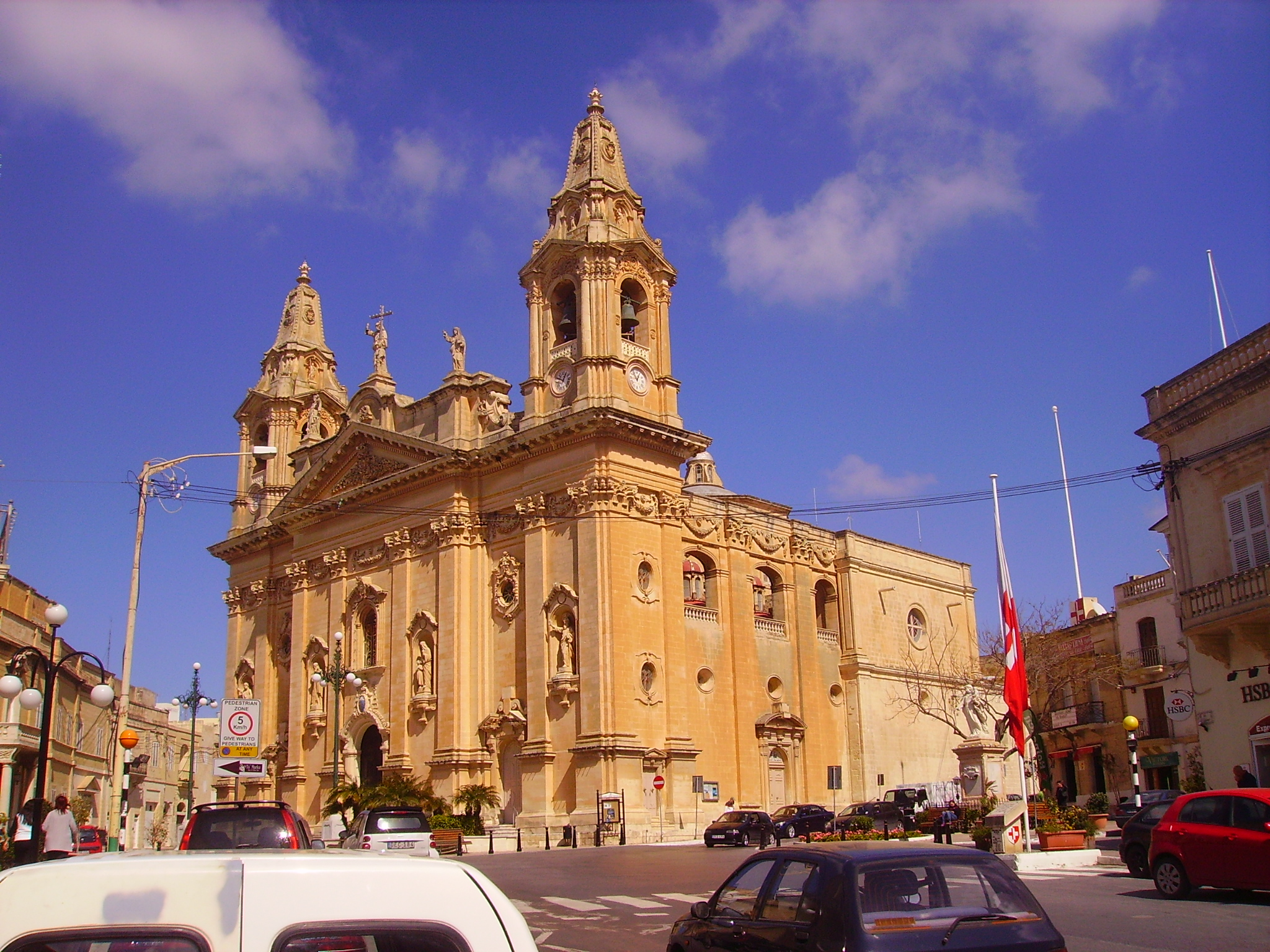
- Church of the Nativity of Mary
- 35°54′53″N 14°26′41″E
- Location: Naxxar, Malta
- Denomination: Roman Catholic
- Website: Website of the Basilica

History
- Status: Parish church
- Dedication: Nativity of Mary
- Consecrated: 11 December 1732

Architecture
- Functional status: Active
- Architectural type: Church
- Style: Baroque
- Completed: 1630

Specifications
- Materials: Limestone

Administration
- Archdiocese: Malta
- Parish: Naxxar

The Church of the Nativity of Mary is a Roman Catholic baroque parish church located in Naxxar, Malta.

== History ==
The Naxxar parish church was one of the 10 parishes, total of 12 when including the parishes of Mdina Cathedral and St Lawrence's church in Birgu, found to be existing by Bishop Senatore De Mello in 1436 and the villages of Mosta and Għargħur were subject to it. De Mello listed it as one of the 12 parishes of Malta and it was the first parish dedicated to Our Lady after that of the old cathedral in Mdina. In 1575, the parish of Naxxar had under its control a total of 36 churches – 14 in Naxxar, 5 in Għargħur, 12 in Mosta and 5 in the neighbourhood of these villages. The present church was built between 1616 and 1630 when there were 1200 inhabitants in Naxxar and it was felt that a larger church was needed. The design was made by Tommaso Dingli, one of the leading architects of the time. The parish priest was Father Gakbu Pace. The choir and the area around it was redesigned in 1691 to the design of Lorenzo Gafà, the same architect who had designed the Mdina cathedral. The parish church was solemnly consecrated by Archbishop Paul Alphéran de Bussan on 11 December 1732.

== Choirs ==
The church has three choirs: the renowned Jubilate Deo choir under the direction of Christopher Muscat, its sister children's choir Pueri Cantores Jubilate Deo handled by Daniela Ellul and Kor Gaudete In Domino directed by Mario Attard.

== Architecture ==
The church also has two transepts and a nave and is 130 feet (40 m) long. The width of the transept is 94 feet (29 m) and the nave 30 feet (9.1 m). The large bell was made by the founder Toni Tanti in 1840 and cost £225. The façade of the church has two clocks, one showing the actual time whilst the other is a painting and shows the time as a quarter to eleven (11.45).

== Works of art ==
The main painting shows the Birth of Our Lady which is attributed to the school of Mattia Preti (1613–1699) whilst at the side there are two paintings by Stefano Erardi (1650–1733) which show the Flight to Egypt and the Adoration of the Magi. Other paintings which show the Madonna and Child, St Cajetan, St Aloysius Gonzaga, Our Saviour and Our Lady of Sorrows are the work of the Maltese painter Frangisku Zahra (1680–1765). In the sacristy hangs the antique painting showing Our Lady of the Rosary which was painted on wood by Gio Maria Abela in 1595.

== Bronze door ==
The main door, which is made of bronze, is dated 1913 and is the work of Pio Cellini. The door is made up of four main panels depicting the coat of arms of Our Lady, Patroness of Naxxar; the village coat of arms; the coat of arms of Pope Pius X and the coat of arms of the family Zammit who were the benefactors of this door. In 1952 this door was dismantled, and renovated and cleaned by the blacksmith Mastru Lucens Agius. The expenses involved were once more paid for by the same family Zammit.

== Statues and processions ==
The statue of the Vitorja, which feast is celebrated on 8 September, was imported from Rome whilst the statues of the Good Friday Procession are the work of a Maltese craftsman. Naxxar was one of the first villages which had the statues of the Passion of Our Lord and in fact it is believed that the procession started being held just after 1750. On 9 November 1787, the body of the martyr St Vittorio was brought from the Catacomb of Calepodius of Rome and is found in the altar in the choir. Some of the sculptures and façades were made by Angelo Quatromanni
