= Basilica of the Nativity of Mary, Senglea =

Basilica of the Nativity of Mary
- The Basilica and Collegiate Parish Church of the Nativity of the Blessed Virgin Mary
- Bażilika u Kolleġġjata tal-Madonna tal-Vitorja
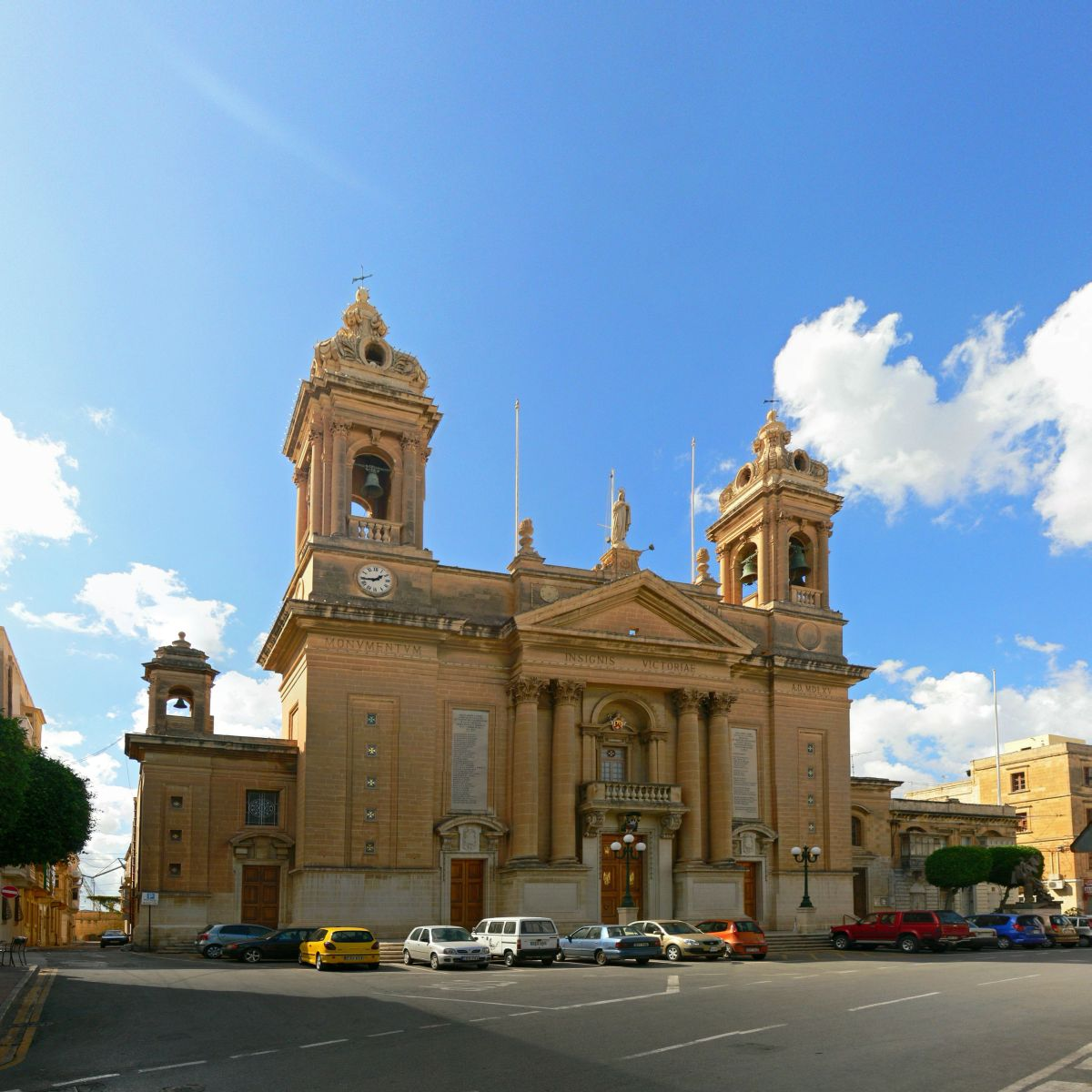
- The Basilica
- Basilica of the Nativity of Mary
- 35°53′08″N 14°31′05″E
- Location: Senglea, Malta
- Denomination: Roman Catholic

History
- Status: Active
- Founded: 1580
- Consecrated: 15 October 1743

Architecture
- Functional status: Parish Church
- Architect: Vittorio Cassar
- Architectural type: Church
- Style: Baroque

Specifications
- Materials: Limestone

Administration
- Archdiocese: Archdiocese of Malta
- Parish: Senglea

The Basilica of the Nativity of Mary or Basilica of Our Lady of Victories is a Roman Catholic parish church located at Senglea, Malta. It is dedicated to the Nativity of the Virgin Mary.

== History ==
It was most probably built by the architect Vittorio Cassar in 1580 as a monument to the Christian Victory after the Great Siege of 1565.

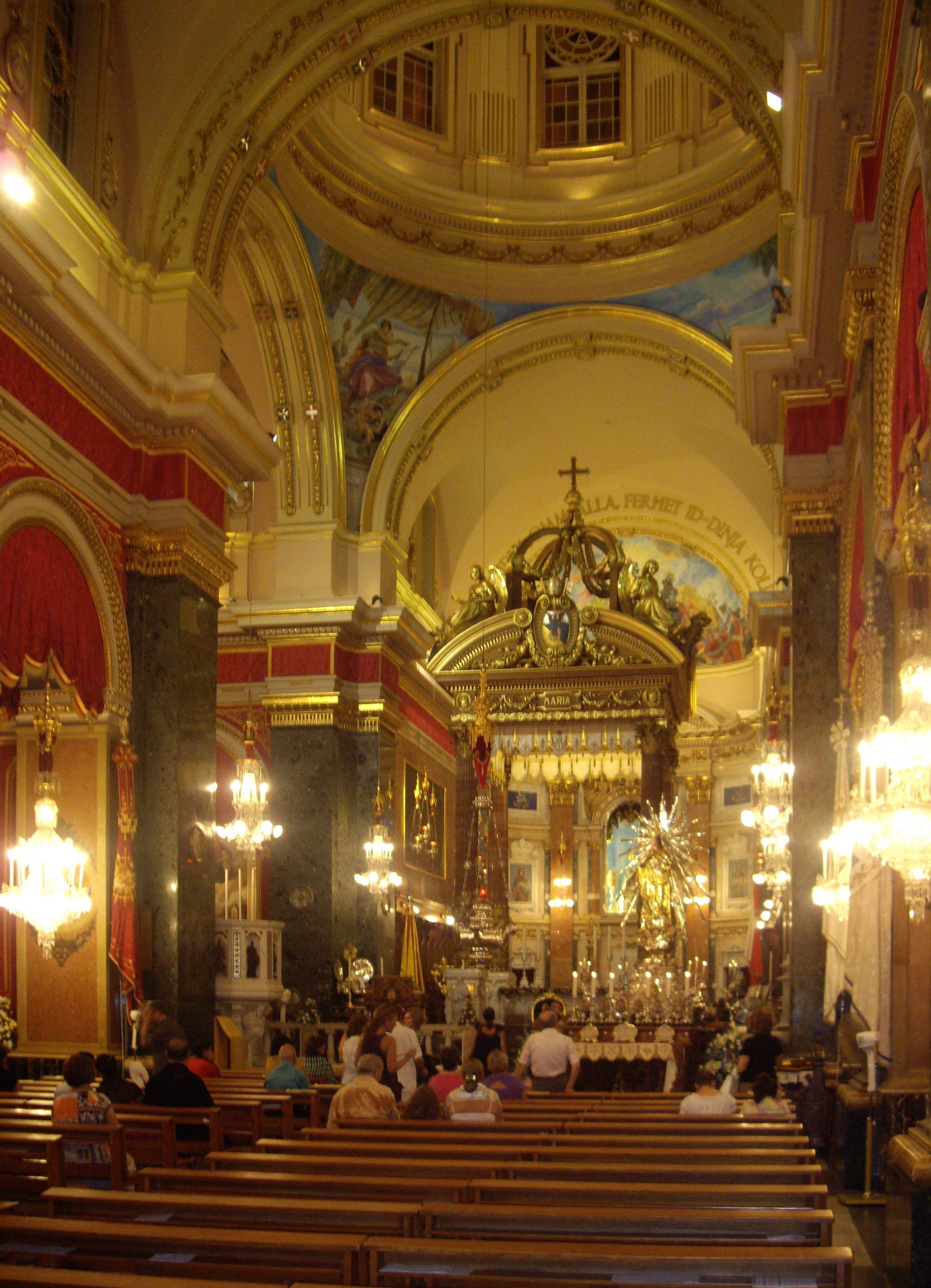
Interior of the Basilica

Senglea became a parish in 1581, and was consecrated on 20 October 1743. On 21 May 1786, Pope Pius VI declared the church to be a "collegiata insignis" (distinguished collegiate church), while in 1921, Pope Benedict XV honoured the church with the title of Basilica. After the crowning of the statue of the Virgin Mary on 4 September 1921, the church became a sanctuary of the Virgin Mary.

The church was destroyed by bombs in 1941, but was rebuilt and consecrated by Archbishop Gonzi on 24 August 1957.

The church building is listed on the National Inventory of the Cultural Property of the Maltese Islands.

== Works of art ==
The main attraction of the basilica is a wooden statue of Mary as a child, known as Il-Bambina. It was the figurehead of a ship which foundered near the coast of Dalmatia in 1618. It was found by sailors on board another ship on which were two men from Senglea. They asked the captain who had determined to donate this image to a church, to give it to their Parish church as it was still without a painting or statue of the virgin. It was painted in 1631 and gilded. The sculptor of this statue is still unknown. After the coronation of the statue of Mary in 1921, the church became a sanctuary. The crown contains diamonds and other precious stones. Around the statue are four silver angels created in 1934. In 1957 a marble statue representing Mary as queen of heaven and earth was placed on the frontispice of the basilica as a memorial of the reconsecration following the reconstruction after the devastation of WW2 , which was consecrated in 1956 was erected. The tribune above the mai altar has the coat of arms of Pope Benedict XV, Archbishop Mauro Caruana, the Senglea Collagiate and the Grand Master La Sengle. The columns show 16 saints who are connected with Maria: Four Evangelists, four popes, four Doctors of the Church and the four founders of Christian orders. On the pillars of the main nave are 16 tondos containing marble images of the apostles, the evangelists and 2 other saints from the book of the acts of the apostles. Furthermore, the church houses seven bells.

== Manuscripts ==
In the Basilica there are many manuscripts dating back to the 17th and 18th centuries. These are located in the Archives and Study Room of the Basilica, located behind the main building. The study room is named after Dom Mauro Inguanez, a Senglea-born Benedictine abbot at Montecassino Abbey. He was instrumental in saving various manuscripts when the abbey was bombarded in 1944, during WW2. Inguanez was instrumental in the bestowing of the title of minor basilica to the Senglea parish as well as the crowning of the statue of the Virgin Mary.

Notable manuscripts found in the archives include a diary written by Francesco Saverio Baldacchino. This diary can shed light on the last years of the Knights in Malta, the French occupation of Malta and the early year of British rule. Currently, this diary is being studied and transcribed by Maltese scholars at the University of Malta.

== See also ==
- Culture of Malta
- History of Malta
- List of Churches in Malta
- Religion in Malta
