= Mariano Gerada =

Maltese sculptor

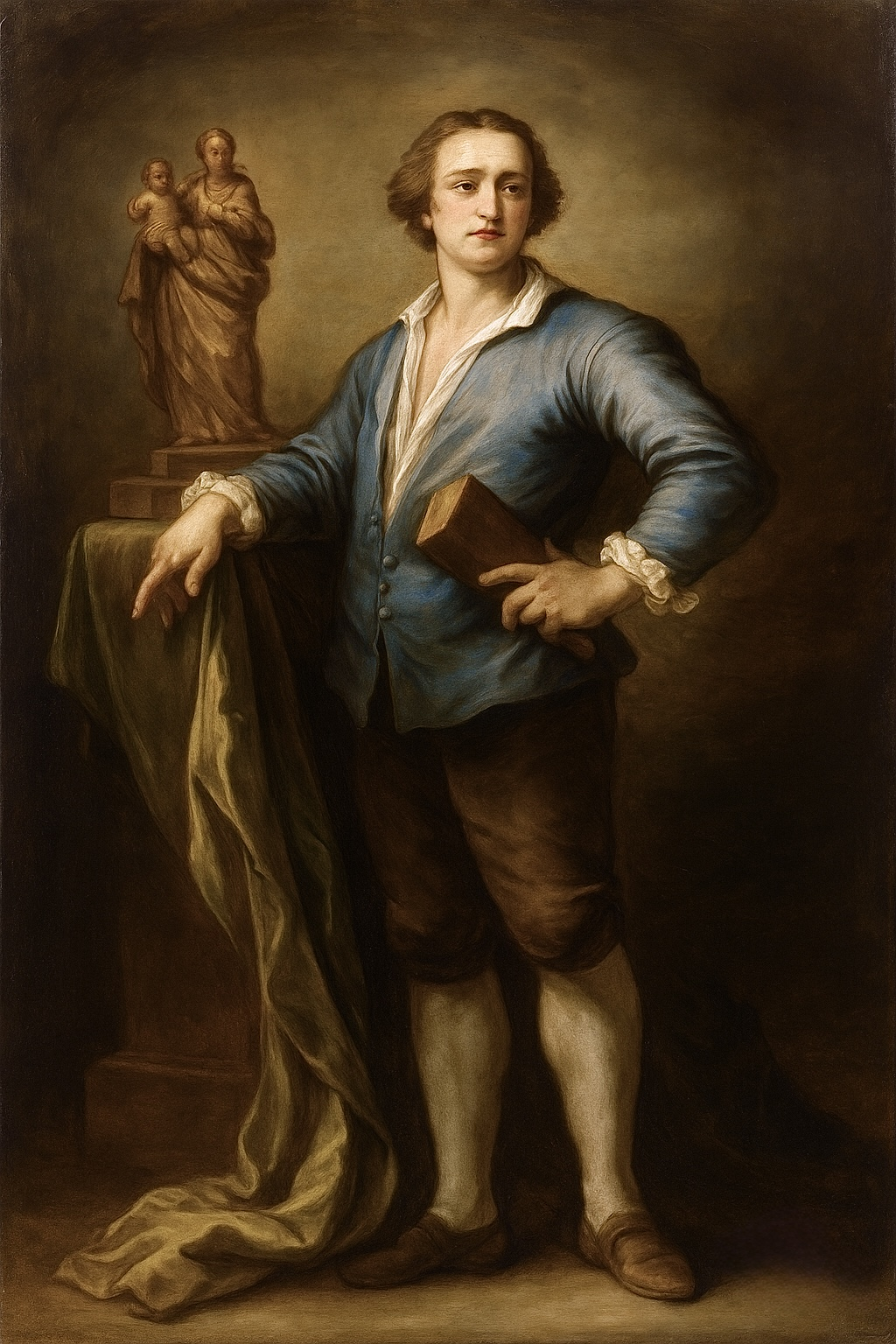
Mariano Girada with the bozzetto of Our Lady of Divine Grace

Mariano Girada

He was trained in Valencia, Spain, and gained fame with his polychrome wooden statues, whose exquisite curves reveal a deep knowledge of Gothic devotional images. Various titular statues carved in wood by the artist can be found around Malta, among them that of Our Lady of Divine Grace in the Sanctuary dedicated to her in Żabbar; the Assumption of Our Lady, known as Santa Marija, sculpted for the village of Għaxaq; and Saint Catherine of Alexandria at Zurrieq. The statue of the Archangel Michael in the parish church of Cospicua is considered another of his masterpieces. The draft model for the Saint Michael statue was made out of the wood that remained from that used to carve the statue of the Assumption at Ghaxaq, and it can still be found in the sacristy of the Ghaxaq parish church.

Among Gerada's non-religious statues are the Lion and Unicorn fountains to the left and right of the entrance of St. John's Co-Cathedral in Valletta. They were carved from local limestone.
