= Dgħajsa =

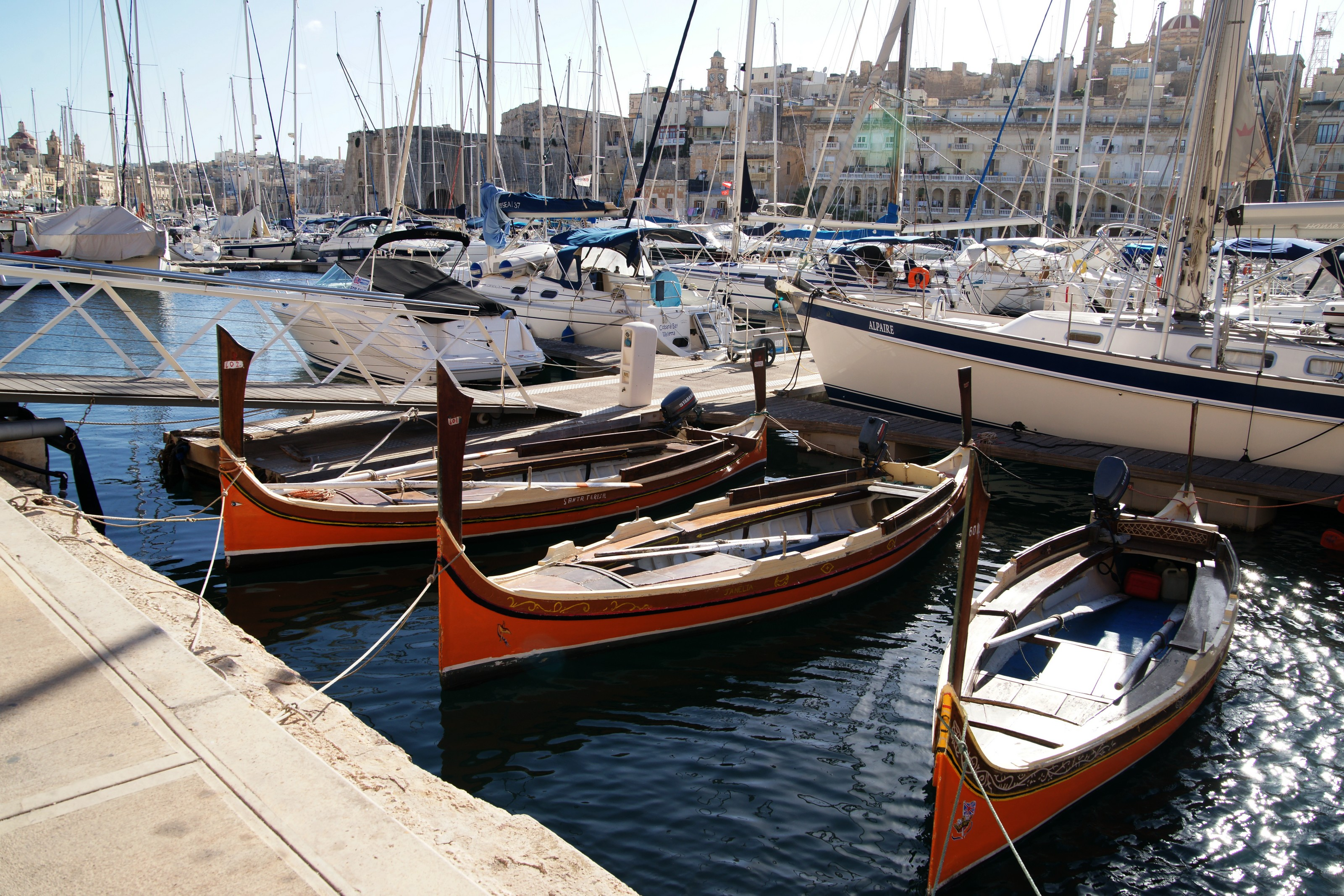
Dgħajjes in Birgu in 2013

The dgħajsa tal-pass (also known as the dgħajsa tal-mogħdija) is a traditional water taxi from Malta. The boat developed in the 17th century, and was extensively used to ferry passengers in the Grand Harbour and Marsamxett Harbour between the 18th and 20th centuries. Their use declined in the late 20th century, and today only a few dgħajjes remain in operation, ferrying tourists around the harbours. Variants of the boats are still used extensively in rowing regattas held twice a year.

== History ==
During Hospitaller rule in Malta, the demand for a ferry service in the Grand Harbour increased as the settlements of Valletta and the Three Cities developed. The dgħajsa tal-pass is believed to have developed to meet this demand in the early 17th century. The earliest known reference to ferry boats in the harbour is from 1601, and the earliest known depiction is a drawing by Willem Schellinks from 1664. The design of the dgħajsa bears similarities with ferry boats from Sicily. The term is a diminutive and a cognate appears in Tunisian Arabic دغيسة dġīsa, an archaic term for a lightship.

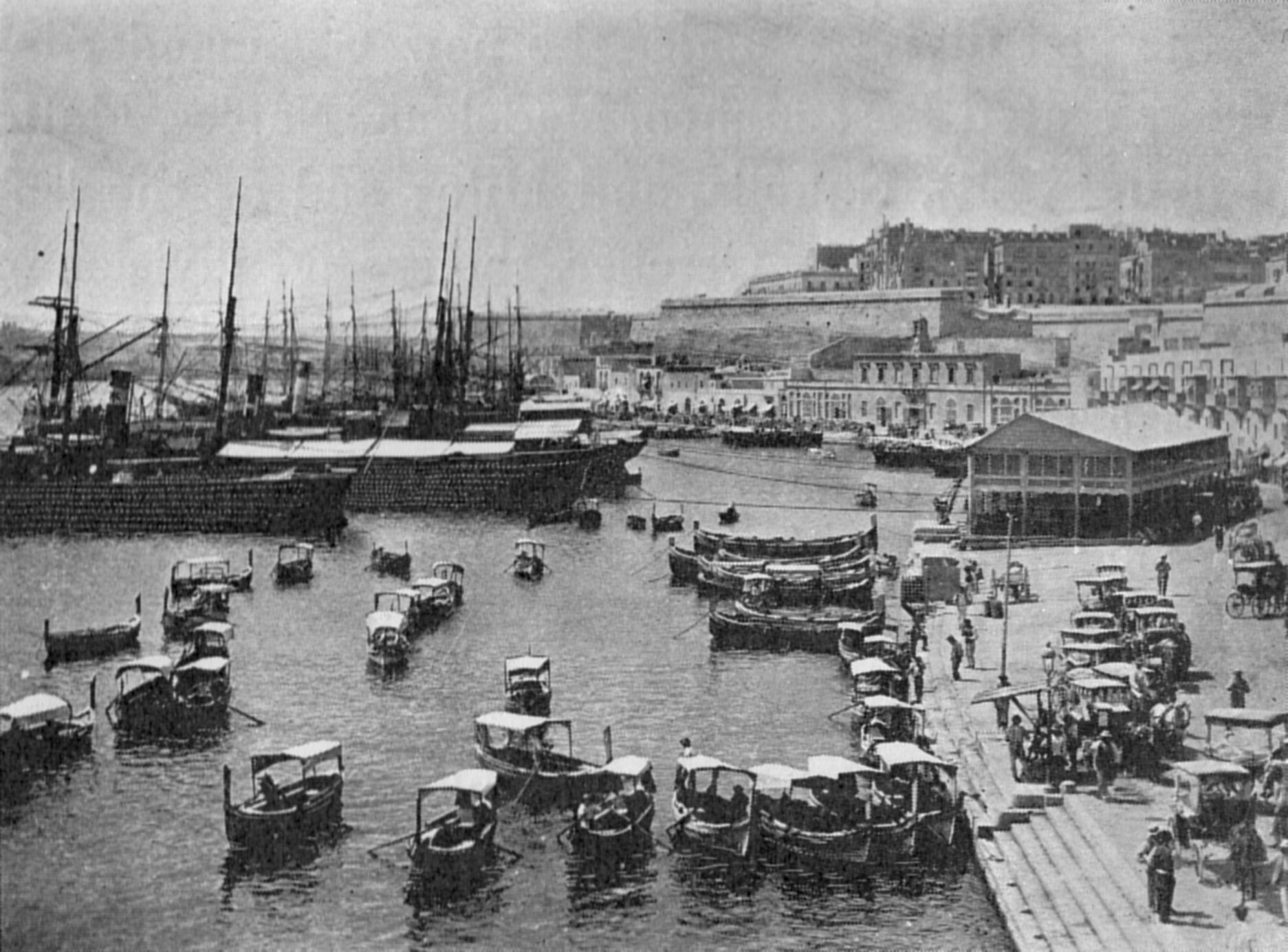
View of the Grand Harbour in the 1890s with various dgħajjes in the foreground.

The number of dgħajjes in the harbour is believed to have greatly increased in the 18th century, and Grand Masters António Manoel de Vilhena and Emmanuel de Rohan-Polduc issued regulations aimed at preventing the escape of Muslim slaves from Malta on board dgħajjes. In the 19th century, when Malta was under British rule, dgħajjes were extensively used to ferry passengers in the Grand Harbour and Marsamxett Harbour. At this point, the design of the boats was modified and they were usually highly decorated.

Dgħajjes were used to ferry people from ships to the shore and also to ferry people between the harbour settlements. It was usually propelled by one man standing, facing forward, and pushing on two oars. In the 1950s, Princess Elizabeth (later Queen Elizabeth II) traveled on a dgħajsa called St. Angelo from a Royal Navy vessel to Fort St. Angelo. This particular boat had been built in 1950–52, and it has been restored and is now used to ferry tourists in the Grand Harbour.

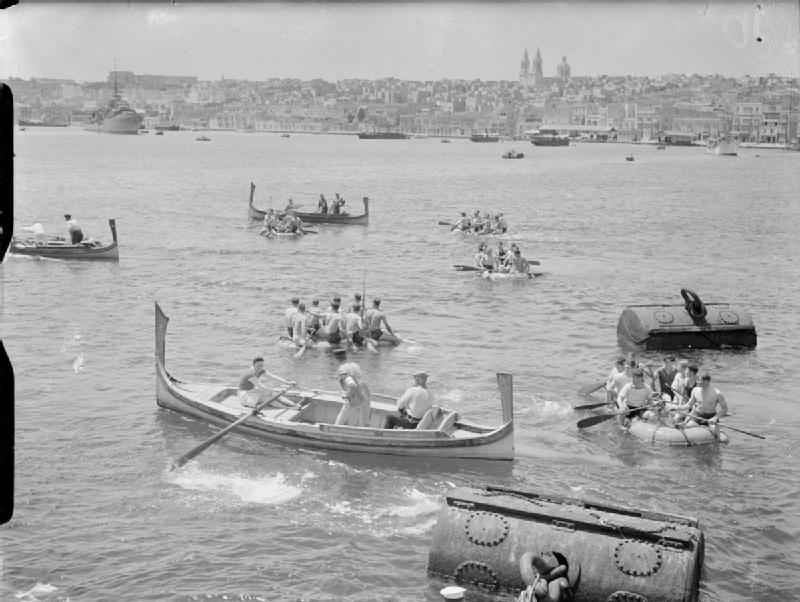
Crew of HMS Kelvin (F37) in dgħajjes and dinghies from their ship preparing for a race during World War II

Some dgħajjes also saw limited use outside Malta. In the 1950s, Salvatore Formosa became the official boatman of HMS Surprise (K346), and his dgħajsa saw use in various Mediterranean ports, including Naples, Saint-Tropez, Rimini, Barcelona and Monaco. While in Venice, he reportedly outran a gondola after challenging its gondolier to a race. Formosa's dgħajsa is now preserved at the Malta Maritime Museum.

The use of the dgħajsa began to decline after steam ferries were introduced in Malta's harbours in 1882 and 1906, and later by the introduction of buses in 1918. The reduction of British forces in Malta later on in the 20th century accelerated its decline. By 1970, many dgħajjes began to be propelled by outboard motors and oars were rarely used. The number of boats has declined greatly since the 1970s, and today no more than a few dozen original boats still survive. Very few people retain the skills of building such boats. The dgħajjes which are still in use today mainly carry tourists on tours around Malta's harbours. The Koperattiva tal-Barklori is a co-operative of boat owners who try to preserve the few remaining dgħajjes. The oldest surviving boat which is still in use is believed to be the Palomba, which was built in the mid-19th century.

== Description ==
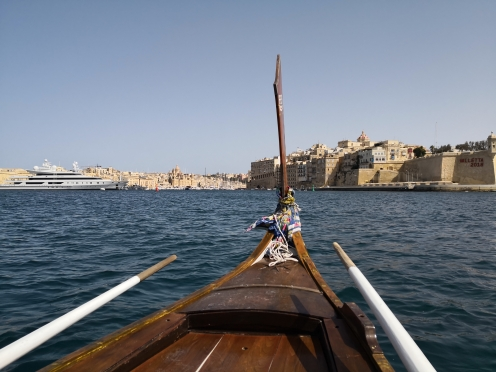
The fore stempost of a dgħajsa

Since the dgħajsa tal-pass is used to ferry passengers within harbours, it is light and the timber used in its construction is not as strong as that in other boats such as the kajjik, luzzu or Gozo boat, which carried greater loads and traveled longer distances. Early dgħajjes had a slanting fore stempost and no washboards, but the latter feature was in use by the mid-18th century. Stemposts at both ends of the boat had been introduced by the end of the 18th century. In the 19th century, the boats usually had a slightly curved fore stempost, but this was replaced by a straight one in the early 20th century. The high stem and stern pieces seem to be mainly ornamental but they are useful in handling the boat and in the boarding and disembarking of passengers.

It is believed that dgħajjes began to be painted in bright colours in the late 18th century, and by the mid-19th century they often bore the Eye of Horus. By the 1880s, many of the boats were decorated with elaborate floral designs which varied from boat to boat.

== Regatta variants ==
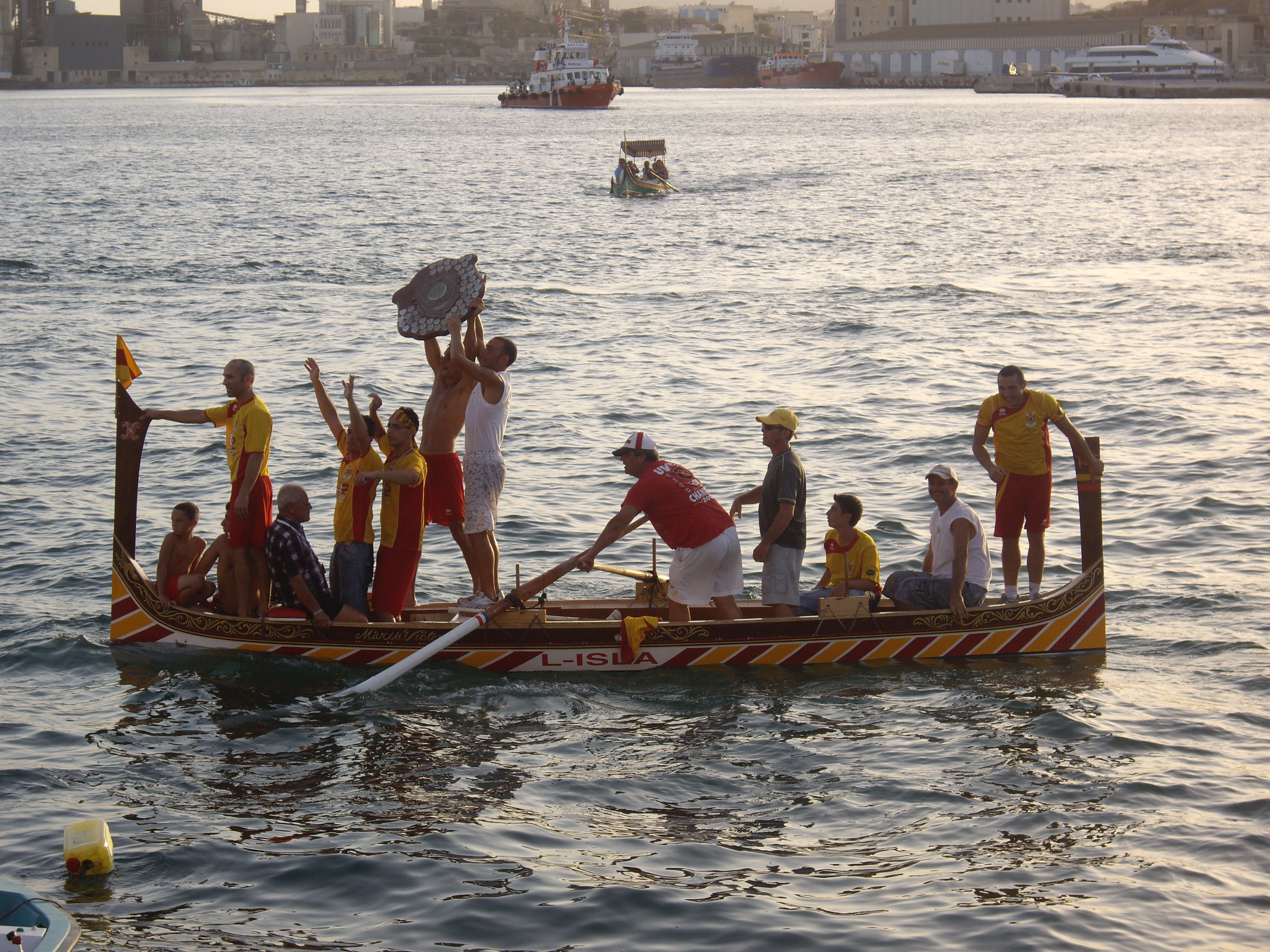
The dgħajsa of Senglea which won the regatta of 8 September 2008

Variants of the dgħajsa are still commonly used in the rowing regattas held in the Grand Harbour on 31 March and 8 September each year. The boats used in the races were initially identical to the water taxis, but from the 1930s they began to be built to be lighter and faster, losing some of the traditional aspects of the dgħajsa tal-pass in the process.

The boats are built to strict specifications. There are two variants of the dgħajsa tal-pass with two or four oars, and a larger variant known as the dgħajsa tal-midalji which also has four oars. The smaller boats are manned by two men: one standing and one sitting, while those with four oars are manned by four: two standing and two sitting.

Variants of other traditional boats, the kajjik and frejgatina, also compete in the regatta.

In 2012, two dgħajjes competed in the Great River Race on the River Thames.

== Legacy ==
Emblem of Malta, 1975–1988

The dgħajsa appeared on the emblem of Malta which was used from 1975 to 1988.

Cyril Tawney's song "The Ballad of Sammy's Bar" mentions these boats in which the last line of every verse is "Call away the di-so". Tawney appended the following note in explanation: "A dgħajsa is a Maltese gondola used by sailors for cutting across the creeks instead of going round them. In Malta they are a legal means of sailors getting back on board ship if they miss the liberty boat. In Britain it is illegal for them to use anything than the official liberty boats to get back to ship."

== See also ==
- Ferilla, another traditional Maltese boat which bears similarities to the dgħajsa
