= Kajjik =

Traditional fishing boat

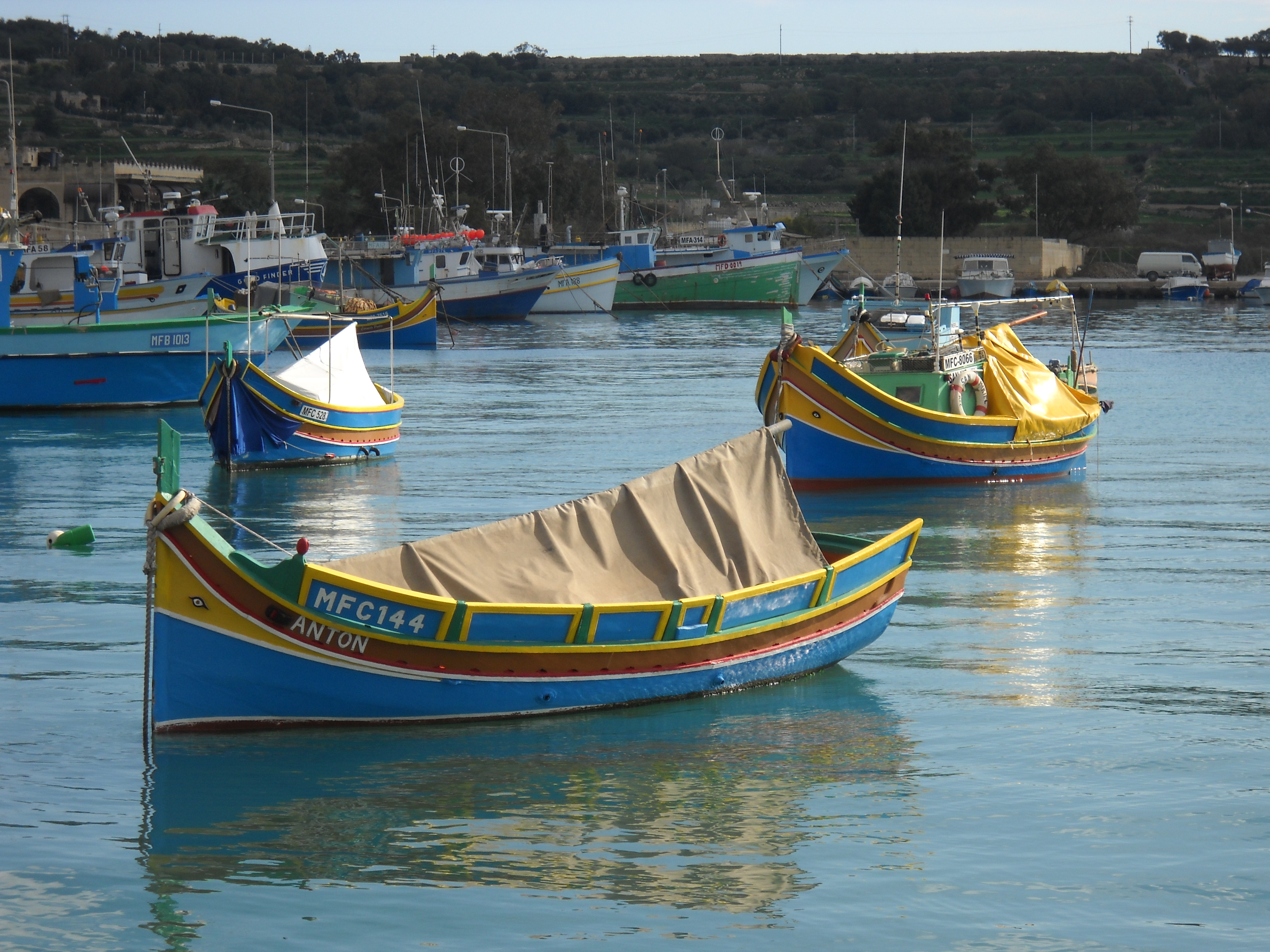
A kajjik in Malta in 2011, with a luzzu in the background

The kajjik or kajjikk is a traditional fishing boat from Malta. It developed in the 17th century from caïques which were used elsewhere in the Mediterranean. In the past, kajjikki were equipped with sails and oars, but today the fishing boats are powered by inboard motors. Variants of the boat participate in the rowing regattas held twice every year.

== History ==
The kajjik developed in the 17th century from the caïques which accompanied galleys of the navy of the Order of Saint John. The boats were usually used as fishing boats, but some were also used to carry passengers.

Variants of the kajjik included the kajjik tal-kopp and the kajjik tal-lampara. The latter had a light source attached to the bow which allowed fishing at night. Another variant was the kajjik tal-gangmu, which had a low bow and a short forestem originally intended for fishing for seashells. This was also used to recover coal which had fallen to the seabed while being loaded onto ships in the Grand Harbour.

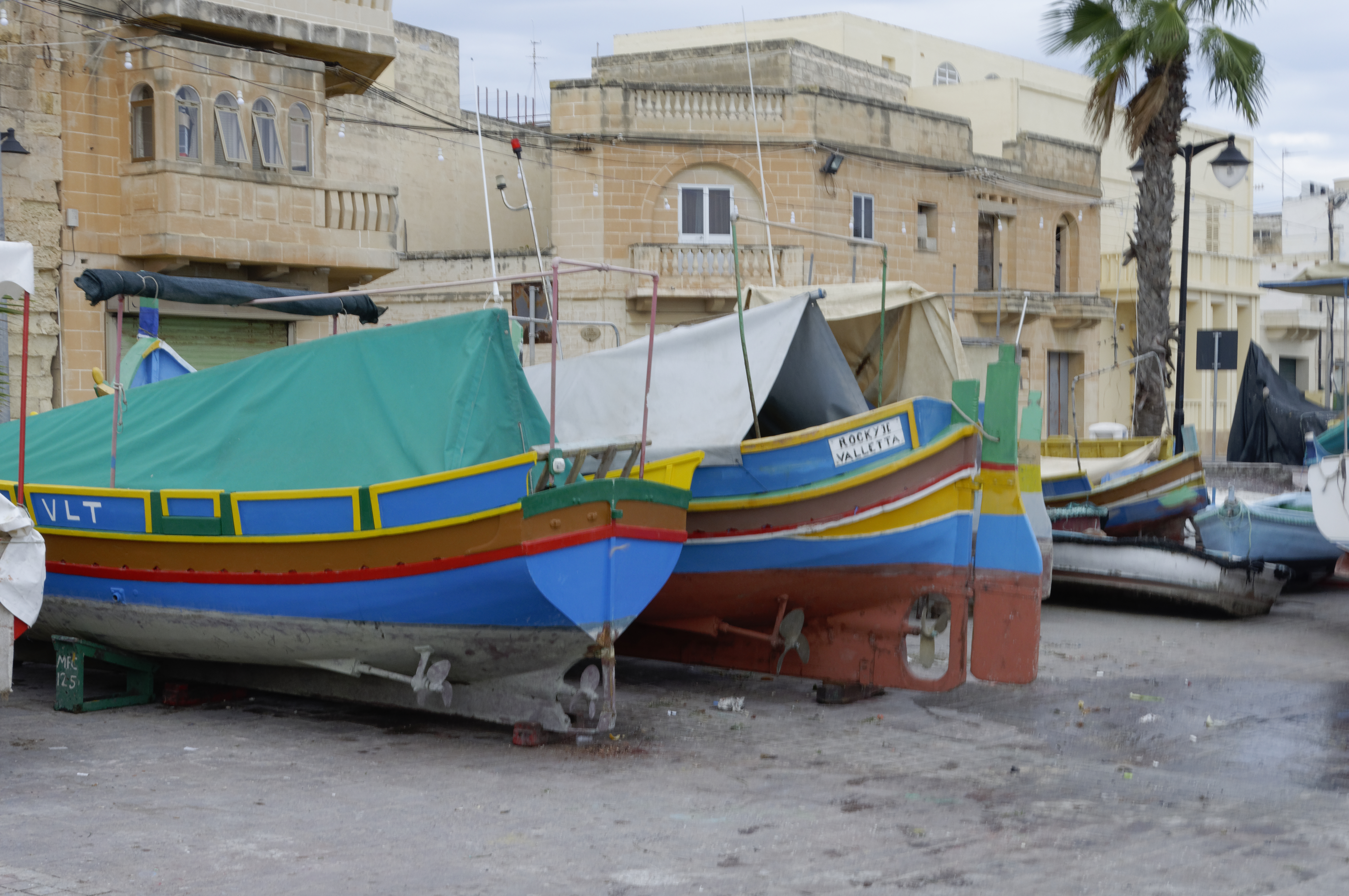
The flat stern of a kajjik as opposed to the double-ended hull of the luzzu

From about 1920, inboard motors were installed on some kajjikki which were used for fishing. Today, the boats are no longer being built and they are on the decline. However, many examples still exist and remain in use as fishing boats, particularly at St. Paul's Bay and Marsaxlokk.

== Description ==
The kajjik bears similarities to the dgħajsa tal-pass, but it is of stronger construction and it has a flat stern. The boats were originally equipped with both oars and sails. They would have a single mast rigged with a spritsail. Today they are propelled by engines.

== Regatta variants ==
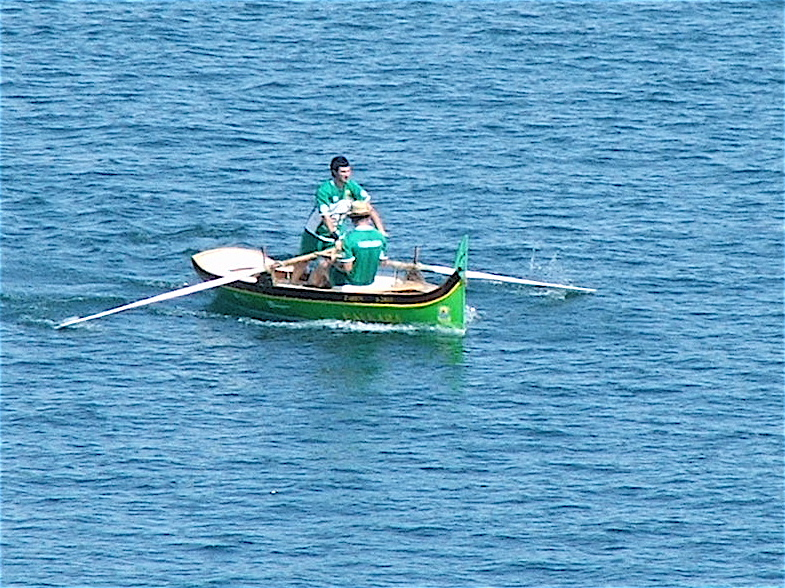
A Kalkara kajjik at the regatta of 8 September 2008

Variants of the kajjik are commonly used in the rowing regattas held in the Grand Harbour on 31 March and 8 September each year. They have been participating in the September regatta since 1822. Initially, kajjikki tal-kopp were used in the races, but purpose-built versions of the boats were introduced later.

The kajjik used in the modern regatta has two oars, and it is manned by a crew of two, one standing and one seated. It is 4.11 metres (13.5 ft) long, has a beam of 1.42 metres (4 ft 8 in) and a depth of 0.53 metres (1 ft 9 in).

Variants of other traditional boats, the dgħajsa and frejgatina, also compete in the regatta.
