= Lists of roads and highways =

This is a list of highways or other major roads around the world. International highways are listed first; after that, roads are listed by continent, and then by country.

== International/World ==
- Alaska Highway
- Arab Mashreq International Road Network
- Asian Highway Network
- International E-road network
- Interoceanic Highway
- Pan-American Highway
- South Pole Traverse
- Trans-African Highway network
- Roman roads

== Africa ==
=== Madagascar ===
- Roads in Madagascar

=== South Africa ===
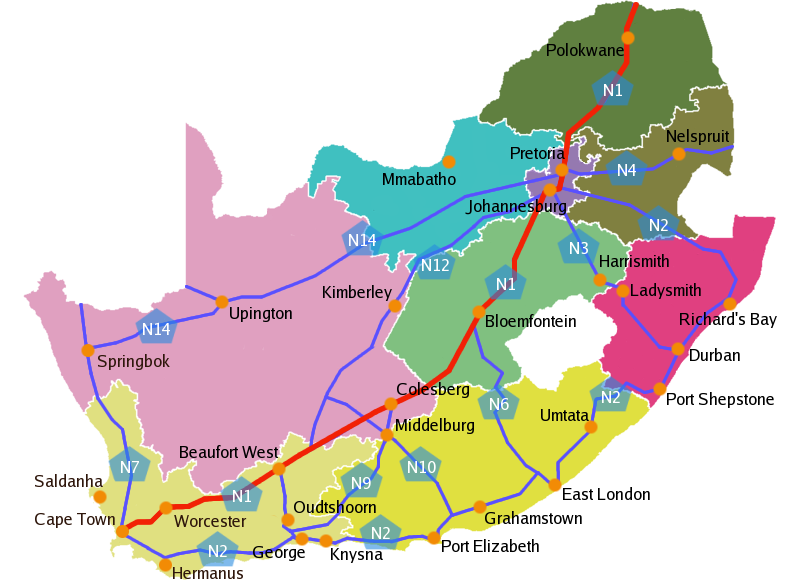
A map of highways in South Africa

- Numbered routes in South Africa
  - List of national routes in South Africa
  - List of provincial routes in South Africa
  - List of regional routes in South Africa
  - List of metropolitan routes in South Africa
- Ring roads in South Africa

=== Zambia ===
- Roads in Zambia

== Asia ==
=== Bangladesh ===
- List of roads in Bangladesh

=== Cambodia ===
- Ancient Khmer Highway

=== China ===
Map of highways in China's National Trunk Highway System

- National Trunk Highway System
- Ring roads of Beijing
- Expressways of Beijing
- China National Highways
- Expressways of China
- List of roads and streets in Hong Kong
- Daxue Road
- Central Beijing Road

=== India ===
Map of India's National Highways. (In this image, north-south highways are shown in blue; east-west highways are shown in red.)

- Roads in India
- National Highways of India
- List of national highways in India
- State highways in India
- Expressways of India
- Transport in India

=== Indonesia ===
- List of toll roads in Indonesia

=== Iran ===
- Freeways in Iran
- List of roads and highways in Iran
- List of expressways in Tehran

=== Iraq ===
- List of Highways in Iraq

=== Israel ===
- List of Israeli highways

=== Japan ===
- Road transport in Japan

=== Korea, South ===
- Expressways in South Korea

=== Kuwait ===
- Transport in Kuwait

=== Malaysia ===
- Malaysian Federal Roads System
- Malaysian State Roads system

=== Pakistan ===
- Motorways of Pakistan
- National Highways of Pakistan
- List of expressways of Pakistan

=== Philippines ===
- Expressways of the Philippines
- Highways of the Philippines

=== Sri Lanka ===
- Expressways of Sri Lanka
- List of A-Grade highways in Sri Lanka
- Transport in Sri Lanka

=== Taiwan ===
- Highway System in Taiwan

=== Thailand ===
- Thai highway network

=== Turkey ===
- List of highways in Turkey

=== Vietnam ===
- Expressways of Vietnam

== Europe ==
=== Belgium ===
- List of motorways in Belgium

=== Czech Republic ===
- Highways in the Czech Republic

=== Cyprus ===
- Motorways and roads in Cyprus

=== Finland ===
- Highways in Finland

=== France ===
Map of autoroutes in France

- Autoroutes of France
- Route nationale

=== Germany ===
- German autobahns
- List of federal highways in Germany

=== Greece ===
- Motorways in Greece
- National roads in Greece

=== Iceland ===
- List of roads in Iceland

=== Ireland ===
- Roads in Ireland
- List of streets and squares in Dublin

=== Italy ===
- State highway (Italy)
- Regional road (Italy)
- Provincial road (Italy)

=== Malta ===
- Transport in Malta
- List of streets and piazzas in Valletta, Malta

=== The Netherlands ===
- List of motorways in the Netherlands

=== Poland ===
- National roads in Poland
- Voivodeship roads

=== Portugal ===
- Roads in Portugal

=== Romania ===
- Roads in Romania

=== Russia ===
- Russian federal highways
- Georgian Military Road
- Amur Cart Road (historical)

=== Spain ===
- Motorways in Spain

=== Sweden ===
- Swedish national road
- List of motorways in Sweden

=== Switzerland ===
- Motorways of Switzerland

=== United Kingdom ===
- Roads in the United Kingdom
- List of motorways in the United Kingdom

== North America ==
=== Canada ===
- Numbered highways in Canada
- Roads in Canada
  - Highways in Nunavut
  - Roads in Ontario
    - Lists of roads in Toronto
  - Roads in Saskatchewan

=== United States ===
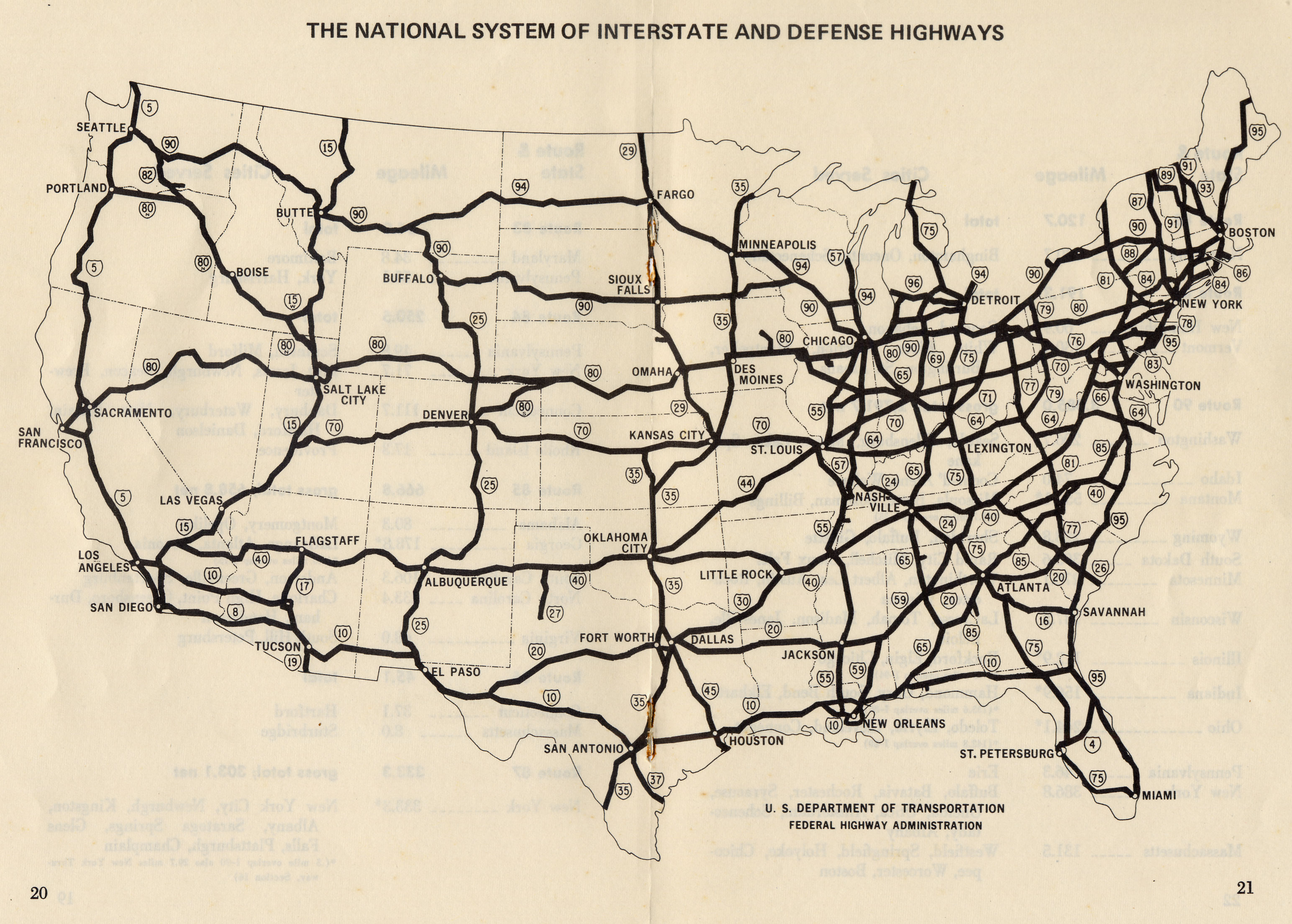
A map of the United States' Interstate Highways as of 1 October 1970

- Numbered highways in the United States
- List of primary Interstate Highways and List of auxiliary Interstate Highways
- List of United States Numbered Highways
- List of state highways in Maryland shorter than one mile (2–699)
- List of state highways in Maryland shorter than one mile (700–799)
- List of state highways in Maryland shorter than one mile (800–899)
- List of state highways in Maryland shorter than one mile (900–999)
- List of Interstate Highways in Washington
- List of U.S. Routes in Washington
- List of state routes in Washington

Further information:

- Interstate Highway System
- United States Numbered Highway System
- Historic trails and roads in the United States

== South America ==
=== Argentina ===
- List of highways in Argentina

=== Bolivia ===
- Yungas Road

=== Brazil ===
- List of highways in Brazil
- Rodovia Presidente Dutra
- Interoceanic Highway (under construction)

=== Chile ===
- List of highways in Chile

=== Peru ===
- Interoceanic Highway (under construction)

== Oceania ==
=== Australia ===
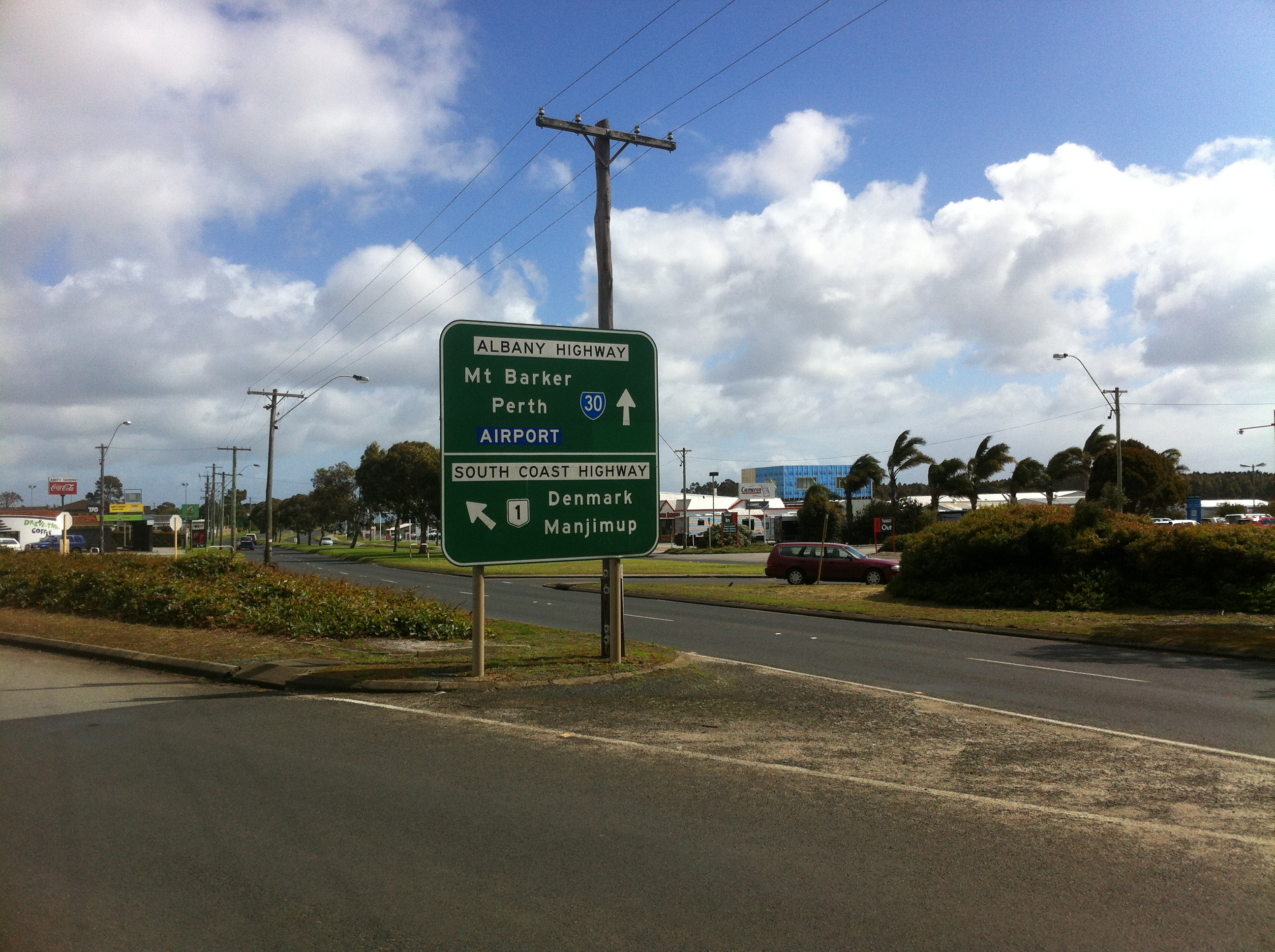
Sign showing the intersection of Albany Highway and South Coast Highway

- Highways in Australia
- Freeways in Australia

For state listings see:

- Highways in New South Wales
- List of highways in Victoria
- List of highways in South Australia
- List of highways in Western Australia
- List of highways in Queensland
- List of highways in the Northern Territory
- List of highways in Tasmania

=== New Zealand ===
- New Zealand state highway network

== See also ==
- Autobahn
- Beltway, also called Ring road
- Controlled-access highway
- Rest area
- Highway
- Limited-access road
- Toll road
- Road
- Grand Trunk Road
- Roman road
- Royal road
- Silk Road
- Historic roads and trails
- Lists of highways by number
