= Ferilla =

Maltese traditional fishing boat, in use from the 17th-19th centuries

A model of a Maltese "Ferilla" boat made out of olive wood.

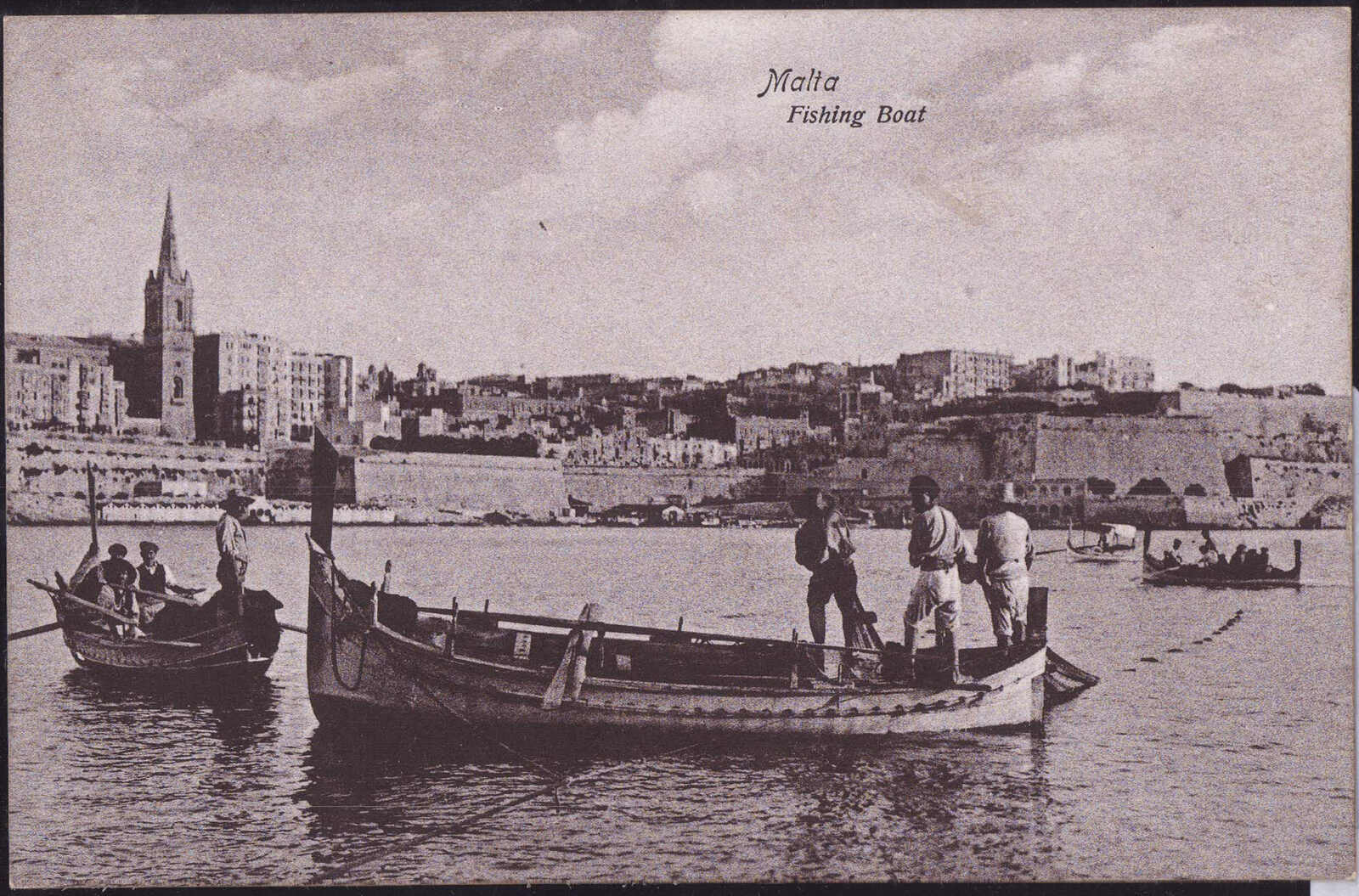
Fishermen aboard ferilli in Marsamxett harbour, around 1910

The ferilla or firilla is a traditional fishing boat from Malta. It bears similarities to the dgħajsa tal-pass, but it is of stronger construction. The ferilla developed in the 17th century and it was common until about 1900. Some examples of this boat type still exist but they are rare.

== History ==
The fishing boat which came to be known as the ferilla developed in the 17th century. At the time, it does not seem to have had a specific name, and the term ferilla referred to a type of small passenger boat which operated between Birgu and Senglea. By the 19th century, the fishing boat became known as the ferilla.

The ferilla tended to remain relatively close to land, initially due to fear of Barbary pirates. It was the most popular type of boat used by Maltese fishermen until around 1900. A few examples still survive in Marsaxlokk, St. Paul's Bay and possibly Gozo. There have been attempts to make replicas of this type of boat out of fibreglass.

The boat also participated in the annual rowing regatta held in the Grand Harbour on 8 September from 1822 until it was replaced by the frejgatina in 1935.

== Description ==
The ferilla bears many similarities to the dgħajsa tal-pass, but it was more sturdy since it was not confined to sheltered harbours. It has a taller forestem and a higher freeboard than the dgħajsa. The bows of the ferilla usually depict the Eye of Horus.

The ferilla is usually less than 30 feet (9.1 m) long, and it was equipped with both oars and sails with a sprit rig. The boats have removable washboards.

The ferilla is recognizable by its very tall fore stem and short aft stem, some examples carried a double layer of gunwhale (the area that rests above the tappiera, which is painted brown on today's boats). These boats carried a tarkija sail, a type of spritsail that has the foot of the yard resting on the bank il-lasta rather than being lashed to the mast.
