= Caïque =

Traditional Greek fishing boat

Caïque

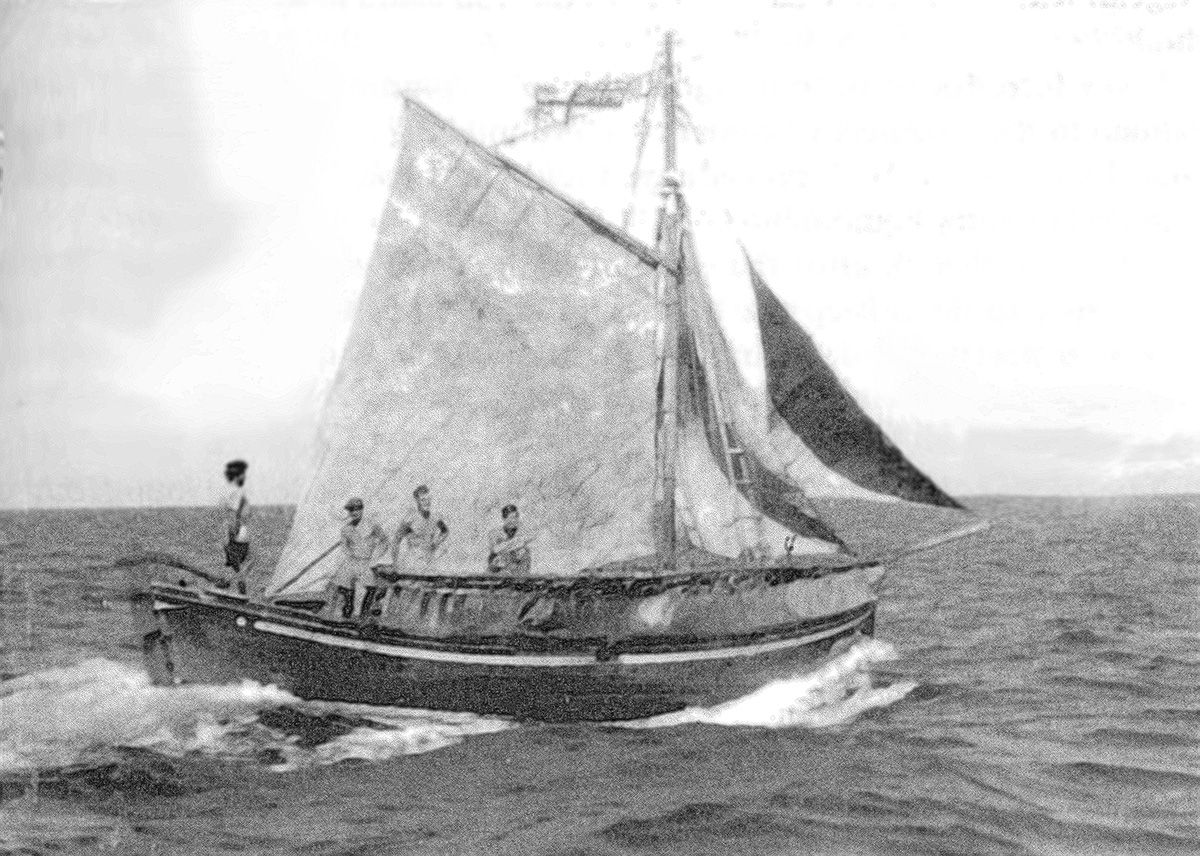
Caïque, WW2

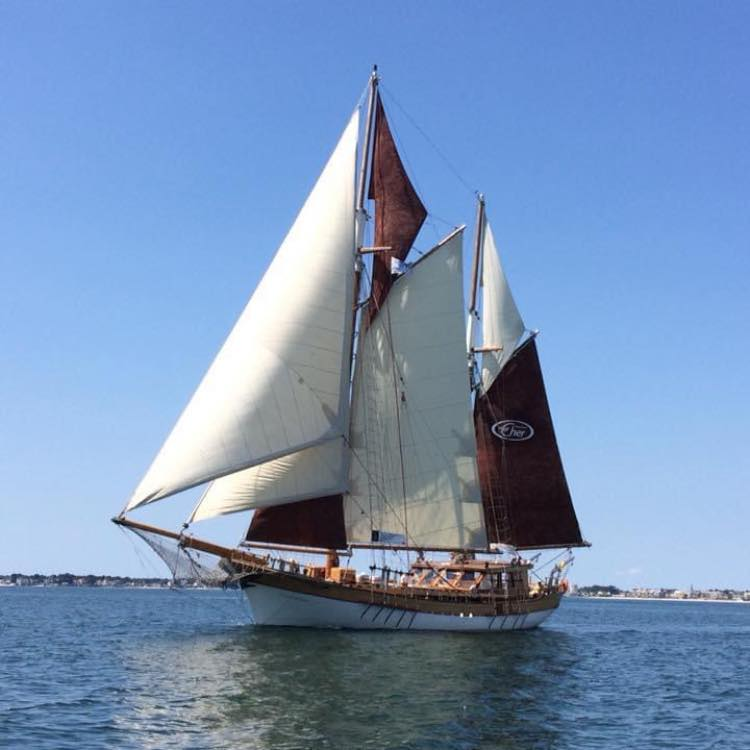
Caïque Bora Bora (ketch)

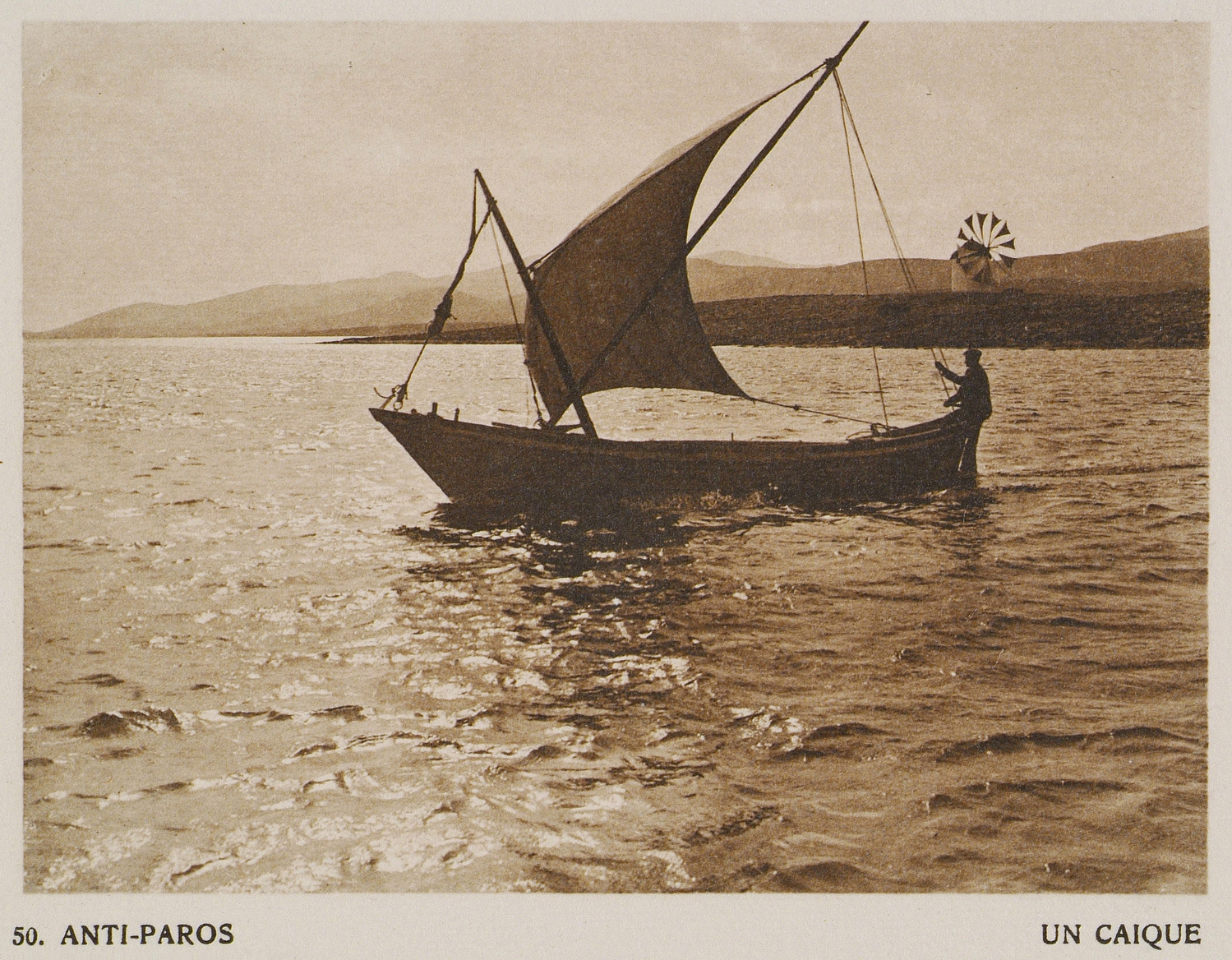
Caïque, 1919

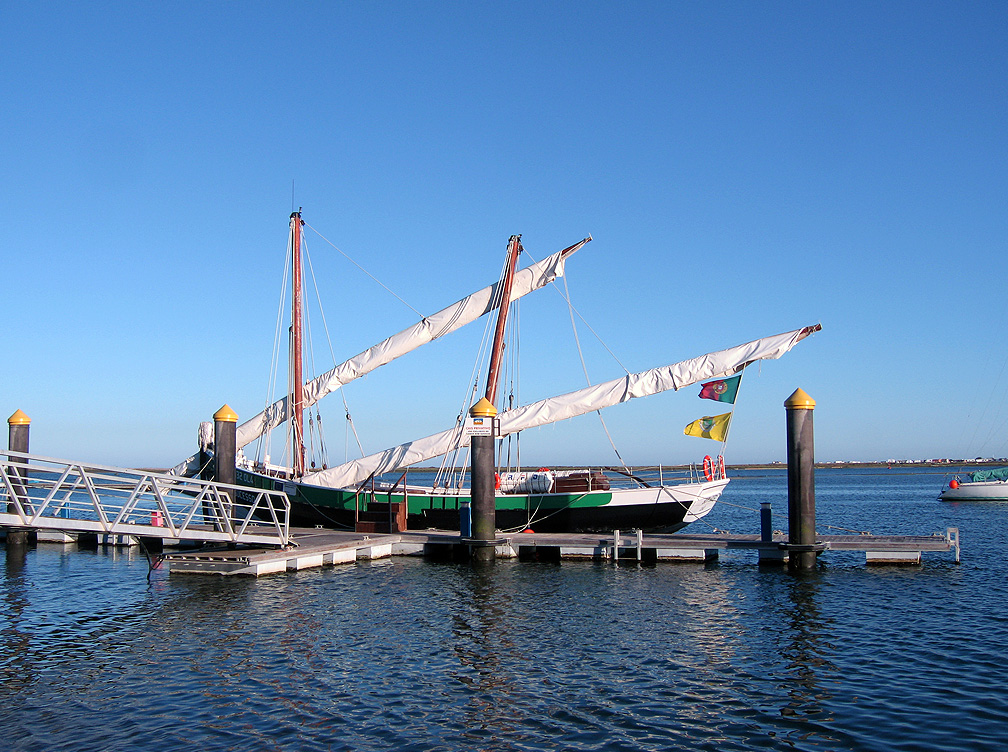
Caïque Bom Sucesso, Olhão, Portugal

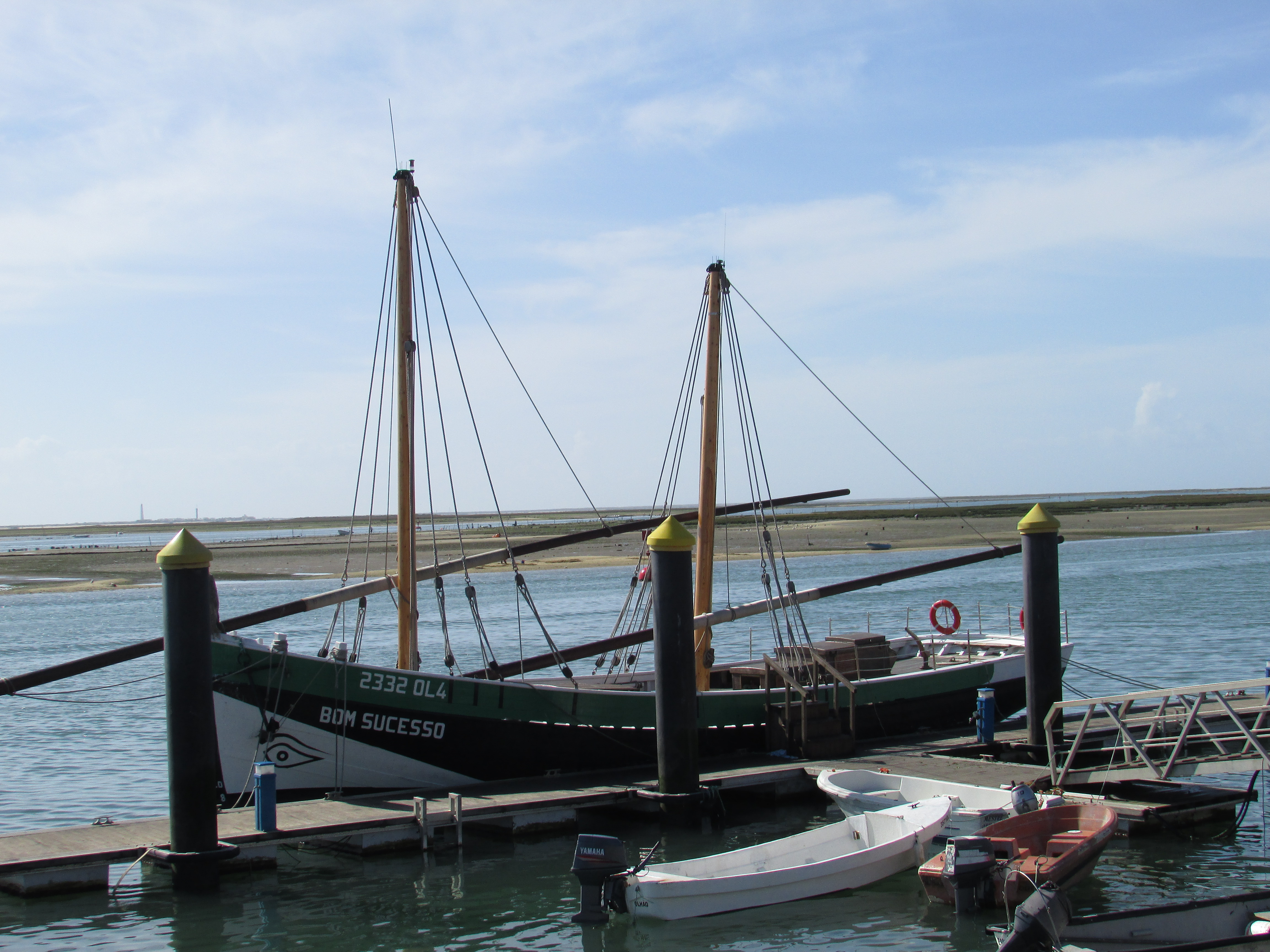
Caïque Bom Sucesso, Olhão, Portugal

A caïque (Greek: καΐκι, kaiki, from Ottoman Turkish: قایق, romanized: kayık) is a traditional fishing boat usually found among the waters of the Ionian or Aegean Sea, and also a light skiff used on the Bosporus. It is traditionally a small wooden trading vessel, brightly painted and rigged for sail. The caïque is also a typical case of positioning the widest beam far aft, with a long sharp bow.

== Aegean fishing boat ==
=== Construction ===
Caïques are often built on the foreshore in a shipyard, from pine wood.

The craft's hull is built with sawn ribs and a timber keel, stem, etc. covered with carvel planking, terminated with the deck. The frame of the craft is often painted with orange primer to preserve and seal the timber. The caïque usually has a short mast.

A bowsprit is stayed by rigging. In the stern of the caïque the predominant form is the tiller. These wooden steering arms are sometimes carved in a dog's or animal's face. The caïque often has a horizontal windlass mounted over the bow. The bow is also known in Greek as the proura or plowri, similar to the English prow.

Most caïques are painted white to counter the powerful sun, with the strakes and topsides in vivid chromatic colors. The boat's name is painted or carved on a tablet on the planking below the bow.

Each caïque is unique. Most are built from the boatbuilder's craft and memory, not from plans. The bow post distinguishes the caïque from other Mediterranean working boats.

=== Modern-day use ===
Traditionally, the caïque was used for fishing and trawling. Lately, it has become a short excursion vessel, and former fishermen make money from the summer tourist trade on busy islands such as Corfu and Mykonos.

The art of the boatbuilder is dying as plastic and fiberglass crafts supersede wooden crafts.

== Bosporus light skiff ==
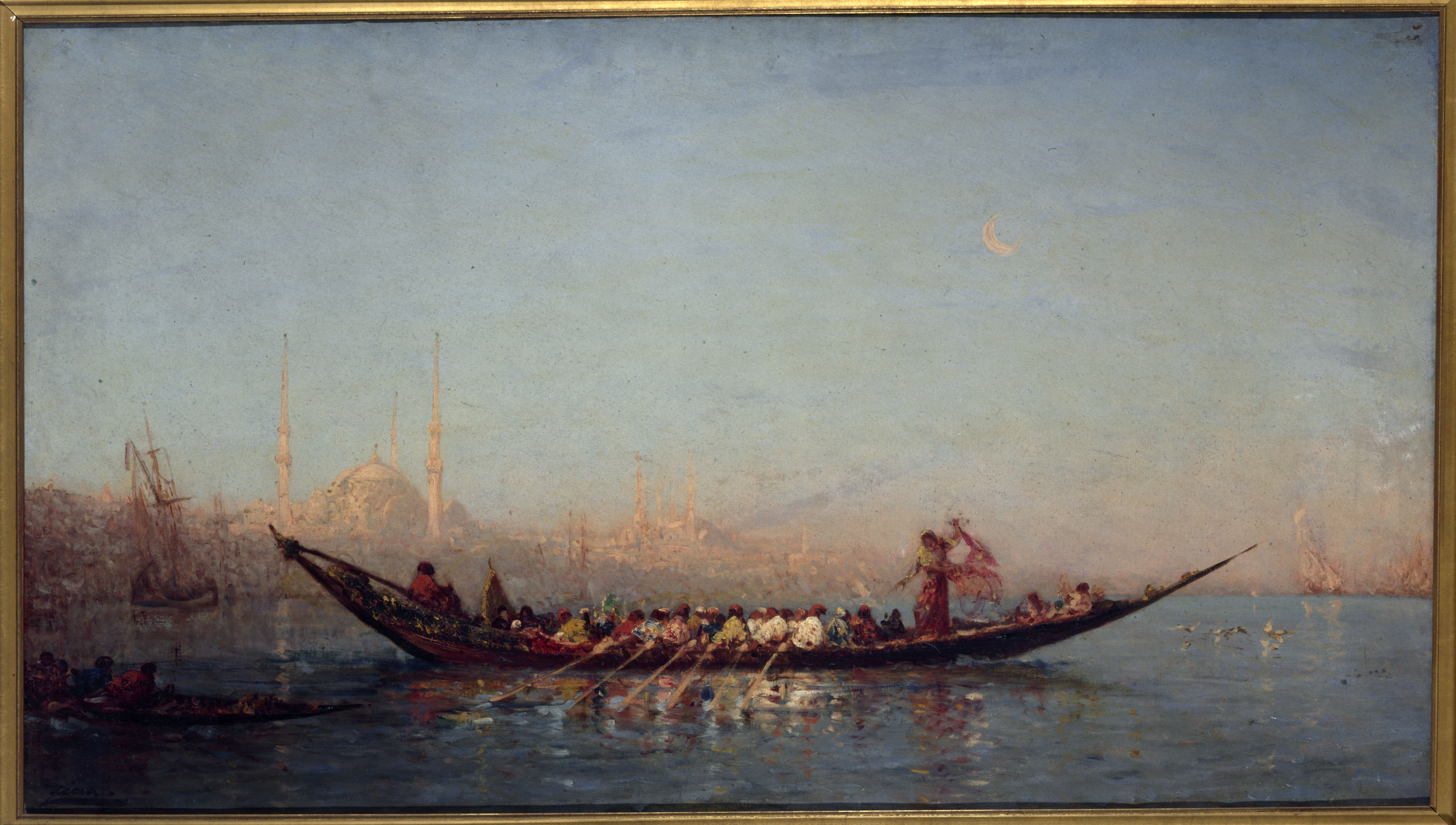
Caïque, used by the Ottoman sultans

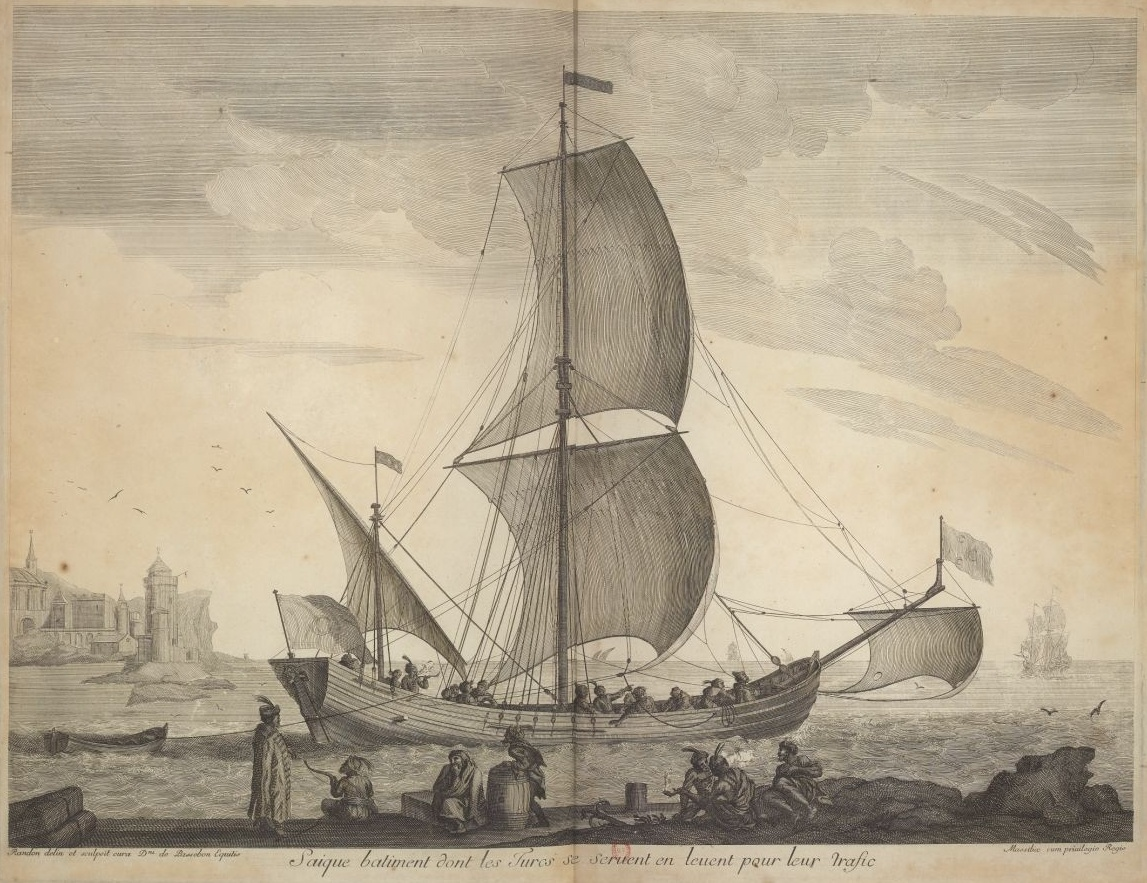
Caïque, used by the Ottomans

Caïque is also the term for a light skiff or long, narrow rowboat used especially on the Bosporus, Turkey.

Historically, a caïque was a boat of 5–6 meters (16–20 ft) in length, and 1 meter (3 ft) in width, used mainly for transportation. It had a shape similar to that of a skate. Both ends were in such a form that it could be rowed in either direction with equal ease. The sides consisted of two long embellished boards. There were also lateral boards supporting the sides against water pressure.

There were also imperial caïques used by the Ottoman sultans and his suite for ceremonial and daily excursion purposes. The size and grandeur of this type, adorned with imperial armorials and floral scrolls, reflected his royal power. Another feature of imperial caiques was the deck pavilion, a partition or a small kiosk for the Sultan. Because of this feature, they were also called "pavilion caïques".

Today, ordinary caïques are used mainly for local fishing purposes, and the current imperial caïques are modern reconstructions utilized only for tourist purposes.

== Etymology ==
From the French caïque, from the Italian caicco, from Ottoman Turkish kayık (the source of the word loaned into Greek kaiki and ultimately the English word as well), related to New Persian qayeq but ultimately from proto-Turkic kiayguk "boat, oar, rowed boat". It bears no connection to kayak.

The similarly-named Maltese kajjik is derived from the caïque.
