= Luzzu =

Maltese traditional fishing boat

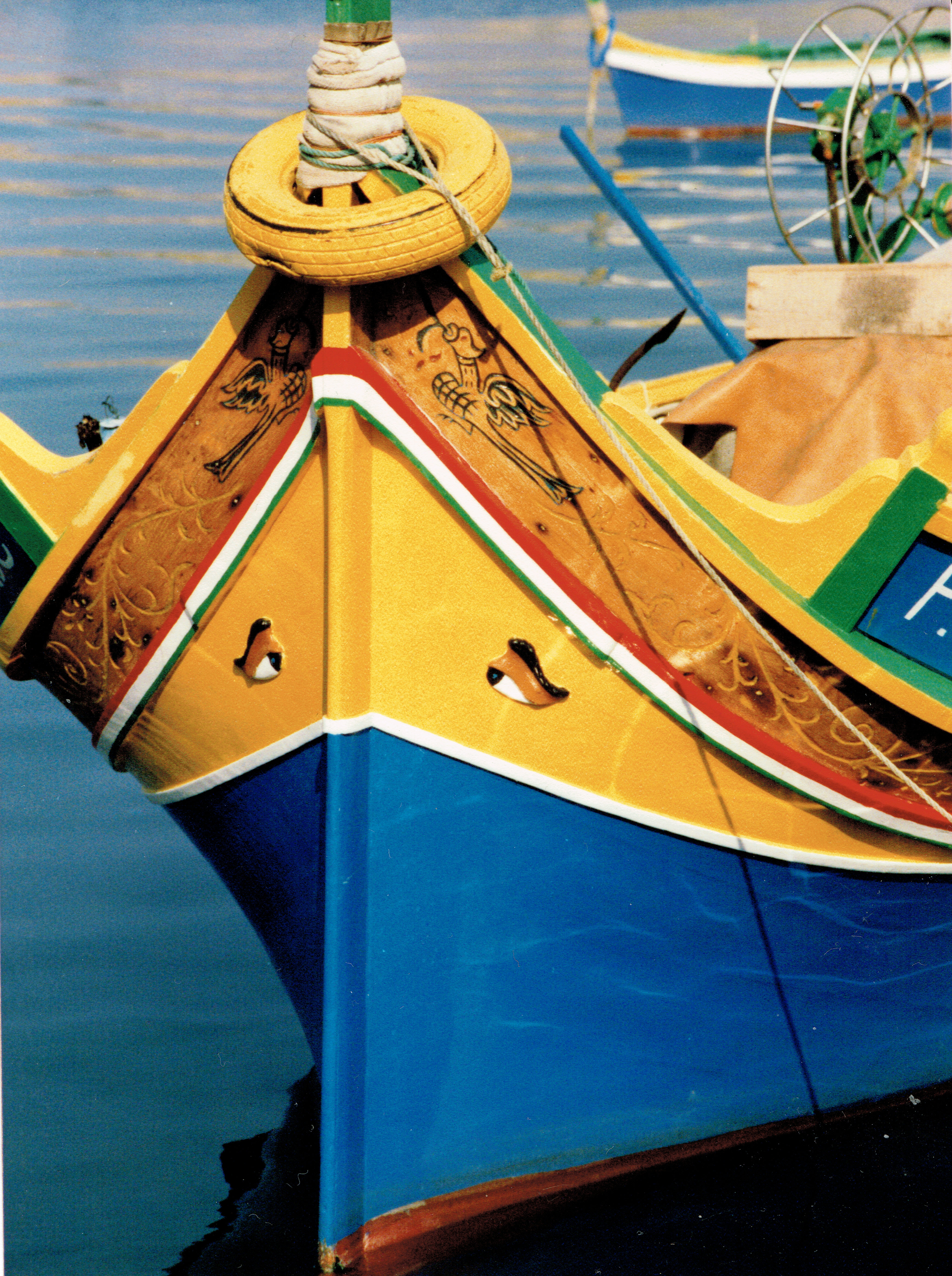
A Maltese luzzu

A luzzu (Maltese pronunciation: [ˈlʊt͡sːʊ]; pl. luzzijiet) is a traditional fishing boat from the Maltese islands. This type of boat developed in the early 20th century, although it is very similar to much older traditional Maltese boats such as the ferilla. They are usually painted in bright colours, while the bow has a pair of eyes.

== Name ==
The word luzzu is derived perhaps from the Sicilian guzzu, which itself should be cognate with Italian gozzo. A guzzu is a common fishing or transport vessel used in Italy and Sicily.

== History ==
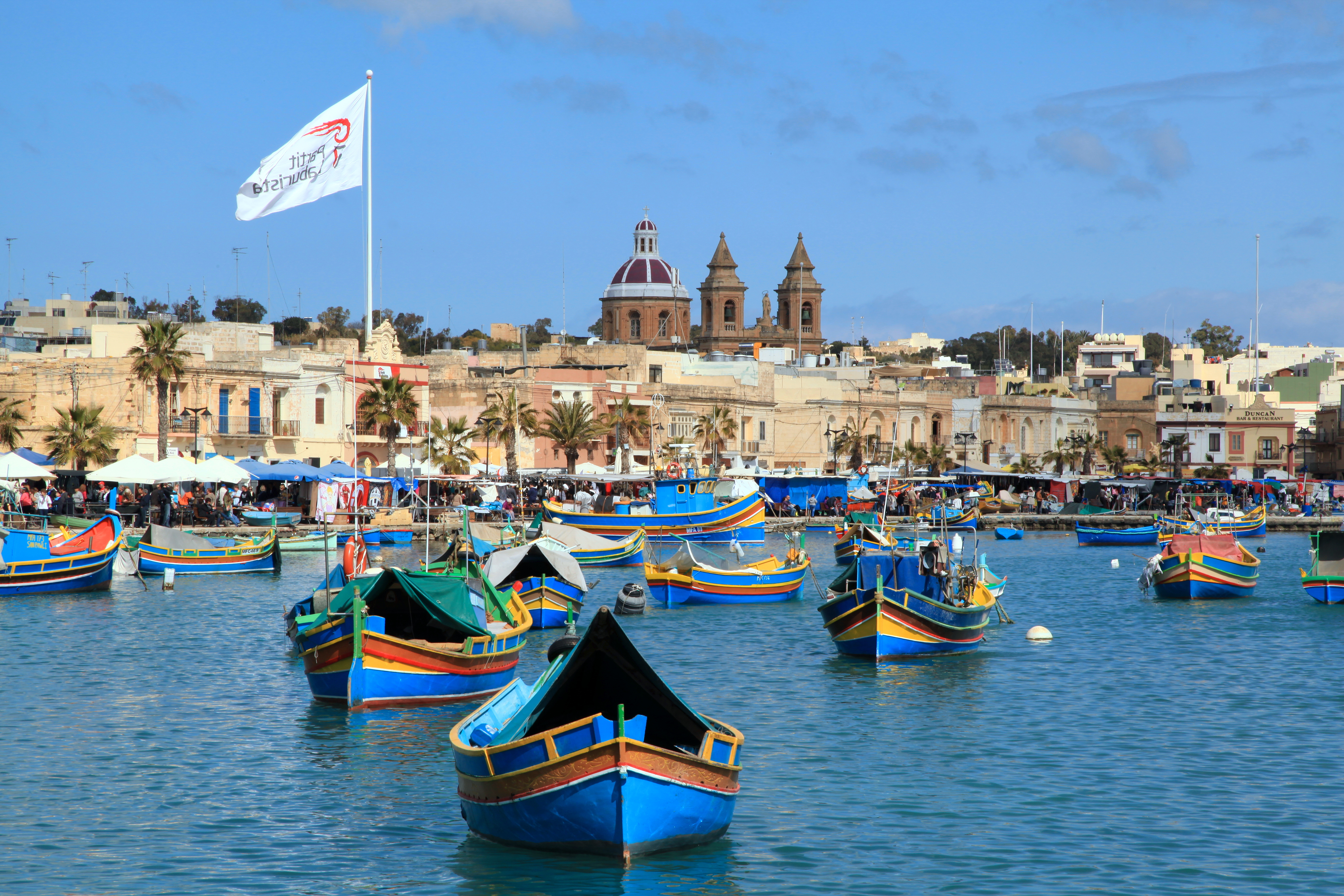
Marsaxlokk Harbour with various luzzijiet

The Italian gozzo visited Malta frequently in the 1880s, and the design of the luzzu is believed to have evolved from it in the early 20th century. The boat is also similar to the Maltese ferilla, but it has a higher freeboard and a shorter stem and is made of stronger timber.

On 30 October 1948, an overloaded luzzu that was being used to ferry passengers from Malta to Gozo capsized and sank off Ħondoq ir-Rummien, and 23 people were killed.

Early luzzijiet were mainly used as transport vessels, but after they were motorised, they became popular as fishing boats. Modern versions of the boats have a deck, and some have a cabin. Today, no new luzzijiet are built, but a few hundred boats are still in operation, particularly at Marsaxlokk. Some luzzijiet have been converted to passenger carriers for tourists, although the vast majority continue to be used as fishing vessels.

== Description ==
The luzzu is a sturdy, carvel-built boat with a double-ended hull. Originally, the luzzu was equipped with oars and sails, although nowadays, almost all are motorised, with onboard diesel engines being the most common.

The boats are brightly painted in shades of yellow, red, green and blue, and the bow is normally pointed with a pair of eyes. These eyes may be the modern survival of an ancient Phoenician custom (also practised by the ancient Greeks and Egyptians); they are referred to as the Eye of Horus or of Osiris. They are said to protect the fishermen while at sea.

In 2016, Prof. Anthony Aquilina from the University of Malta determined that there are some traditional rules that come into play when choosing the colour palette for a luzzu.

Whilst reddish brown or maroon was typically painted on the lower half of the boat to mark the waterline, the locality of a boat’s owner could be identified by the colour of its mustaċċ. The mustaċċ is the band above the lower half of the boat, shaped like a moustache, which gives the feature its name. A red mustaċċ would indicate that the boat came from St Paul’s Bay, for example. A lemon yellow indicated a boat from Msida or St Julian’s, whilst an ochre yellow one would identify the boat as hailing from the Marsaxlokk and Marsascala area. When a mustaċċ was painted black, it denoted mourning for a death in the family.

The town of Marsaxlokk is especially famous for the large numbers of luzzu and similar craft operating in its harbour. The luzzu is often considered a symbol of Malta.
