= Freedom Day (Malta) =

Public holiday in Malta, 31 March

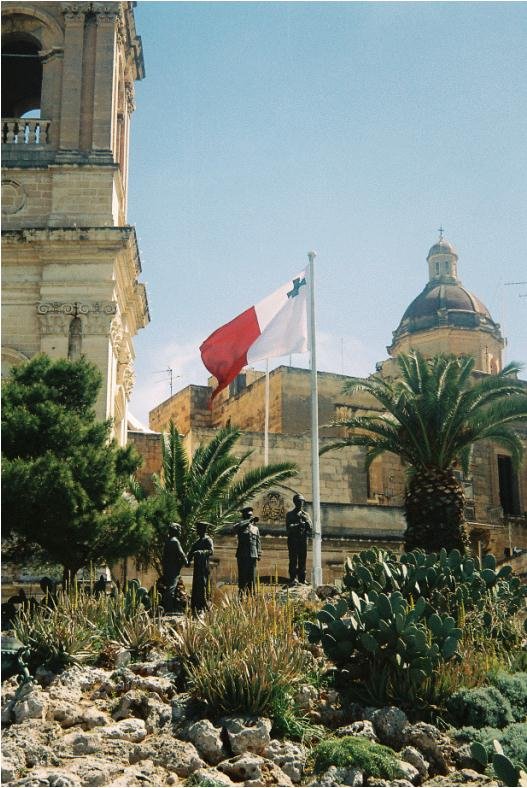
- Freedom Day Monument, Birgu
- Observed by: Malta
- Type: Historical/cultural/remembrance
- Significance: In remembrance of the withdrawal of British troops from Malta.
- Date: 31 March
- Next time: 31 March 2026
- Frequency: annual

Freedom Day (Maltese: Jum il-Helsien) is a Maltese national holiday celebrated annually on 31 March. This is the anniversary of the withdrawal of British troops and the Royal Navy from Malta in 1979. On taking power in 1971, the Labour Government indicated it wanted to re-negotiate the lease agreement with the United Kingdom. Following protracted and sometimes tense talks, a new agreement was signed whereby the lease was extended till the end of March 1979 at a vastly increased rent. On 31 March 1979 the last British Forces left Malta. For the first time in a millennium, Malta was no longer a military base of a foreign power and it became independent de facto as well as de jure.

The main events of the activities commemorating this date take place at the Freedom Day Monument at Birgu (Vittoriosa) (designed by Anton Agius) and at the War Memorial in Floriana. In the afternoon the Grand Harbour hosts a competitive regatta. The regatta often attracts thousands of spectators and participants from the three big cities (Birgu, Bormla and Isla), as well as coastal towns. The regatta forms part of two annual rowing race events, the second being on Victory Day.

== See also ==
- Freedom Day (disambiguation) in other countries
- History of Malta
- Holidays in Malta
- Victory Day
