= Daxue Road =

Street in Chengdu, China

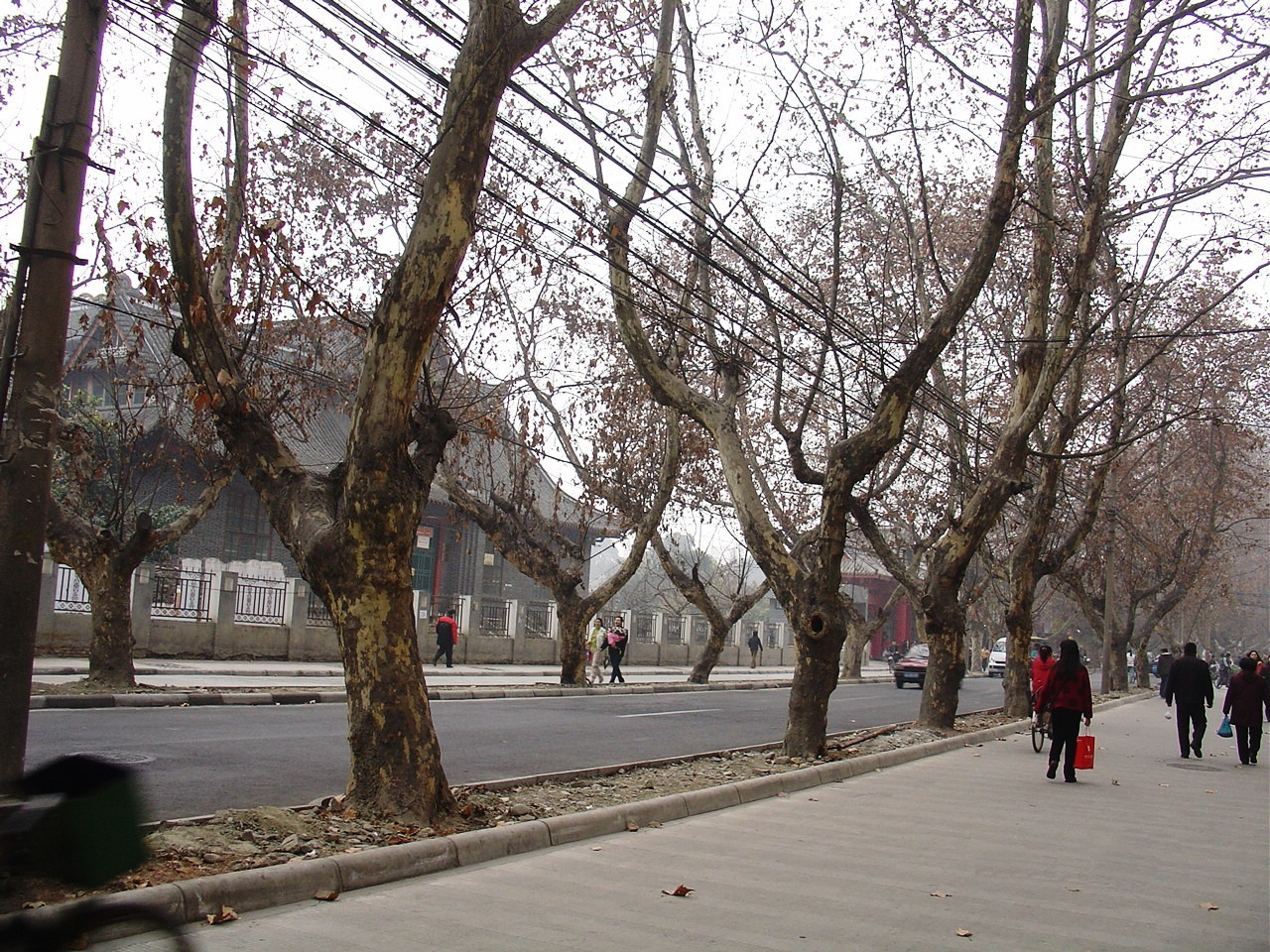
Streetscape of Daxue Road, Chengdu

Daxue Road (simplified Chinese: 大学路; traditional Chinese: 大學路; pinyin: Dàxúe Lù; lit. 'University Road') is a small but historical street in Chengdu, China, now a tourist attraction. The meaning of its name in Chinese is "University Road", as it was first a road near West China Union University in 1910, now the Huaxi Campus of Sichuan University (四川大学华西校区).

== Orientation ==
Daxue Road is located in the south of Chengdu, running a west–east direction. It begins from South Renmin Road (人民南路) and continues eastward towards Hongxing Road (红星路). The road is about 800 metres (2,600 ft) long and 20 metres (66 ft) wide. 116 phoenix trees (Stercuiia platanitolia) lining the street and divided it into three parts, two for pedestrians and one for cars.

== History ==
=== Beginning of 20th Century ===
In 1905, West China Union Middle School was established through the joint efforts of four Protestant mission societies of three nations, namely, the American Baptist Foreign Mission Society, the Friends' Foreign Mission Association of Great Britain and Ireland, the General Board of Missions of the Methodist Church of Canada, (later the United Church of Canada) and the Board of Foreign Missions of the Methodist Episcopal Church USA. The school was developed into West China Union University in 1910 under the same supervision and built according to the plans set out mainly by Fred Rowntree. The Daxue Road was one of the interior roads of the university at that time. Moreover, it was called "Main road to city south gate" and "road to city east gate" as the gateway road of the university to the city. On the north side of the street there were mainly dormitories of university students and staff accommodations of West China Union Middle School and on the south side were the teaching area of the university. Along the street, there are the Whiting Memorial Administration Building (懷德堂), The Lamont Library and Harvard-Yenching Museum (懋德堂), education offices (no longer existing), Religious Room (no longer existing), etc.

=== After the foundation of the PRC to the 21st Century ===
As the mushrooming of urban construction in Chengdu, in 1960, the newly planned South Renmin Road separated the university into two parts. And as the increasing of residence housings built in and around this district, Daxue Road, from an interior university road, gradually became a city street serving all the citizens. In the 1990s, it was one of the major markets in Chengdu, named as "University Road Market (大学路菜市场)". Between every phoenix tree, there was one or two stalls, strengthened to the pedestrian area. The total area of the market reached about 8,000 m2. During the night, there was a night market, with mobile stalls selling cheap food and small commodities everywhere. Pedestrians, bicycles and cars all went through in the center of the road.

=== 2006 to present ===
In 2006, the Chengdu government listed Daxue Road as one of the important reforming Culture Blocks. A new Market building was built and all the former vendors had been asked to move in. Buildings along the street had been repainted. Brick walls enclosing the campus had been replaced by iron railings or hedges in order that people walking on the street could see the campus buildings. After this renewal, although on the ground floor of the buildings along this street are mostly small restaurants and groceries, Daxue Road became one of the main transportation roads west-east orientation of Chengdu.

== Sightseeing ==
Along the street, there are two buildings listed in the Heritage buildings in Chengdu in 2001.

=== The Whiting Memorial Administration Building ===
The Whiting Memorial Administration Building (懷德堂) was originally the studio of West China Union University (華西協合大學事務所). It was built from 1915 to 1919, designed by British Architect Fred Rowntree, who was also the main designer of the whole campus. It used the inverted arched technology at that time, which was advanced during that time. Now, this building is used as the office building of Huaxi Campus of Sichuan University.

=== The Lamont Library and Harvard-Yenching Museum ===
The Lamont Library and Harvard-Yenching Museum (懋德堂) finished being constructed in 1926 and is now used as the Campus History Museum of Sichuan University.

== See also ==
- Protestantism in Sichuan
