= Frejgatina =

Maltese traditional fishing boat

The frejgatina (plural frejgatini) is a traditional fishing boat from Malta, its name meaning "little frigate." It is a small, carvel-built rowing boat. It is generally only used to travel between the shore and a larger boat anchored offshore.

It is transom-sterned, open, and steered with two oars, although some modern boats have engines attached, to move the boat and/or operate the winch. Some modern frejgatini are made with fibreglass instead of wood.

Since 1935 frejgatini have raced in the annual Victory Day regatta.
