= List of streets and piazzas in Valletta =

Below is a list some streets and piazzas (squares) in Valletta, the capital city of Malta.

== Main thoroughfares ==
- Archbishop Street (Maltese: Triq l-Arċisqof; alt. Strada Vescovo)
- Battery Street (Maltese: Triq il-Batterija)
- Bishop Lane (Sqaq l-Isqof)
- Carmelo Street (Triq Tal-Karmnu)
- Carts Street (Triq il-Karrijiet)
- Castile Place (Maltese: Pjazza Kastilja)
- St Elmo Place (Maltese: Misraħ Sant'Iermu)
- Old Bakery Street (Maltese: Triq l-Ifran; alt. Strada Forni)
- St. Biagio Street (Triq San Bjaġju)
- Boat Street (Maltese: Triq il-Lanċa)
- Bounty Street (Triq l-Għajnuna)
- Bull Street (Triq il-Gendus)
- Eagle Street (Maltese: Triq l-Ajkla; alt. Strada Aquila)
- East Street (Maltese: Triq il-Lvant; alt. Strada Levante)
- Engineers Lane (Sqaq l-Inġinieri)
- Felix Street (Triq Feliċ)
- G. Cassar Road (Triq Ġirolomu Cassar)
- West Street (Maltese: Triq il-Punent; alt. Strada Ponente)
- Knight Street (Triq il-Kavallier)
- M.A. Vassalli Street (Triq Mikiel Anton Vassalli)
- Mediterranean Street (Maltese: Triq il-Mediterran)
- New Street (Triq il-Ġdida)
- Republic Street (Maltese: Triq ir-Repubblika; alt. Strada Rjali, Kingsway)
- Old Hospital Street (Triq l-Isptar)
- Old Mint Street (Triq Żekka; alt. Strada Zecca)
- Old Treasury Street (Triq it-Teżorerija)
- Old Theater Lane (Sqaq tat-Teatru l-Antik)
- Old Theater Street (Maltese: Triq it-Teatru l-Antik; Strada Teatro)
- Ordinance Street (Triq l-Ordinanza)
- Great Siege Road (Maltese: Triq l-Assedju l-Kbir)
- King's Garden Street (Maltese: Daħlet Ġnien is-Sultan)
- Lascaris Wharf (Xatt Lascaris)
- Liesse Hill (Telgħet Liesse)
- Lower Barrakka Lane (Sqaq il-Barrakka t'Isfel)
- Marsamxett Street (Maltese: Triq Marsamxett)
- Melita Street (Maltese: Triq Melita)
- Merchants Street (Triq il-Merkanti; alt. Strada Mercanti)
- Mill Street (Triq il-Mitħna)
- Nelson Avenue (Vjal Nelson)
- Nix Mangiari Steps (Taraġ Nix Mangiari)
- North Street (Triq it-Tramuntana)
- Pope Pius V Street (Triq il-Papa Piju V)
- Scots Street (M.A.Vassalli; alt. Strada Scozzese)
- South Street (Triq Nofsinhar; alt. Strada Mezzodì)
- St Andrew's Street (Triq Sant'Andrija)
- St Anne's Street (Triq Sant' Anna; alt. Strada Sant'Anna)
- St Anthony's Street (Triq Sant'Antnin)
- St Barbara's Bastion (Is-Sur ta' Santa Barbara)
- St Charles Street (Triq San Karlu; alt. Strada San Carlo)
- St Dominic's Street (Triq San Duminku; alt. Strada San Domenico)
- St Fredrick's Street (Triq San Federiku; alt. Strada San Federico)
- St George's Street (Triq San Ġorġ)
- St John's Street (Triq San Ġwann; alt. Strada San Giovanni)
- St John's Cavalier Street (Triq il-Kavallier ta' San Ġwann)
- St Joseph Street (Triq San Ġużepp)
- St Lucy Street (Triq Santa Luċija)
- St Michael's Street (Triq San Mikiel)
- St Nicholas Street (Triq San Nikola)
- St Paul Street (Triq San Pawl; Strada San Paolo)
- St Patrick's Street (Triq San Patrizju)
- St Sebastian Street (Maltese: Triq San Bastjan)
- St Ursula Street (Triq Sant' Orsola; alt. Strada Sant'Orsola)
- Zachary Street (Triq Żakkarija; Strada Zaccaria)
- Christopher Street (Maltese: Triq San Kristofru)
- St Mark Street (Maltese: Triq San Mark)
- Spur Street (Maltese: Triq l-Ixpruna)
- Fountain Street (Triq l-Għajn)
- Steps Street (Triq it-Turġien)
- Strait Street (Triq id-Dejqa; alt. Strada Stretta)
- Quarry Wharf (Maltese: Xatt il-Barriera)
- St Dominic Street (Maltese: Triq San Duminku)
- Toni Bajada Lane (Sqaq Toni Bajada)
- Victory Street (Triq il-Vitorja)
- Wells Street (Triq l-Ibjar)

== Piazzas ==
A piazza (Maltese: pjazza, misraħ) is a public square. A number of formerly existing square in Valletta no longer exist.

- St Elmo's Square (Maltese: Misraħ Sant' Iermu)
- St John's Square (Maltese: Misraħ San Ġwann)
- St George's Square (Maltese: Misraħ San Ġorġ), also known as Palace Square (Maltese: Misraħ il-Palazz)
- Republic Square (Maltese: Misraħ ir-Repubblika), also known as Queen's Square (Maltese: Pjazza Reġina, Italian: Piazza Regina) and Italian: Piazza Tesoreria
- Great Siege Square (Maltese: Misraħ l-Assedju l-Kbir)
- Freedom Square (Maltese: Misraħ il-Ħelsien)
- Jean De Valette Square (Misraħ De Valette)
- Castille Square (Maltese: Misraħ Kastilja), also known for a while as Italian: Piazza Regina
- Independence Square (Maltese: Misraħ Indipendenza)
- Mattia Preti Square (Maltese: Misraħ Mattia Preti)

== Bastions ==
- Abercrombie's Bastion (Is-Sur ta' Abercrombie)
- Ball's Bastion (Is-Sur ta' Ball)
- Castile Bastion (Is-Sur ta' Castile)
- English Curtain (Is-Sur tal-Ingliżi)
- French Curtain (Is-Sur tal-Franċiżi)
- German Curtain (Is-Sur tal-Ġermaniżi)
- Lascaris Bastion (Is-Sur ta' Lascaris)
- Lower Castile Bastion (Is-Sur ta' Isfel ta' Castile)
- St Barbara's Bastion (Is-Sur ta' Santa Barbara)
- St Gregory's Bastion (Is-Sur ta' San Girgor)
- St James Bastion (Is-Sur ta' San Ġakbu)
- St John's Bastion (Is-Sur ta' San Ġwann)
- St Lazarus Bastion (Is-Sur ta' San Lażżru)
- St Michael Bastion (Is-Sur ta' San Mikiel)
- St Sebastian's Bastion (Is-Sur ta' San Bastjan)

== Historical names of Valletta's streets and squares ==
Original	Informal	French	British	British post-1926	Maltese
Porta di San Giorgio		Porte Nationale	Porta Reale	Kingsgate	Putirjal/Bieb il-Belt
Piazza San Giorgio	Piazza dei Cavallieri	Place de la Liberté		Palace Square	Pjazza San Ġorġ
Piazza dei Cavallieri	Piazza della Città	Place de l'Egalité	Piazza Regina	Victoria Square	Pjazza Repubblika
Strada San Giorgio	Strada delle Corse	Rue Nationale	Strada Reale	Kingsway	Triq ir-Repubblika
Strada San Giacomo	Strada di Castiglia	Rue de Marchands	Strada Mercanti	Merchants Street	Triq il-Merkanti
Strada San Luigi	Strada Sant’Aloisio	Rue de la Constitution	Strada Levante	East Street	Triq il-Lvant
Strada San Paolo	-	Rue de la Constitution	Strada San Paolo	St Paul Street	Triq San Pawl
Strada San Pietro	Strada della Chiesa di San Rocco	Rue de la Barraque	Strada St Ursula	St Ursula Street	Triq Sant’Ursula
Strada San Giovanni Battista	-	Rue des Fours	Strada Forni	Old Bakery Street	Triq l-Ifran
Strada San Sebastiano	Strada Toro	Rue de la Monnaie	Strada Zecca	Old Mint Street	Triq Żekka
Strada Stretta	Strada Vanella	Rue Etroite	Strada Stretta	Strait Street	Triq id-Dejqa
Strada Pia	Strada del Gran Falconiere	Rue de la Félicité Publique	Strada Britannica	Britannia Street	Triq Melita
Strada di Monte	Strada dei Carcerati	Rue de Peuple	Strada San Giovanni	St John Street	Triq San Ġwann / In-Niżla tal-Ganċ
Strada del Popolo	Strada di Aragona / Strada dei Greci	Rue des Libérateurs	Strada Vescovo	Archbishop Street	Triq l-Arċisqof
