= Maltese National Regatta =

Traditional rowing event in Malta

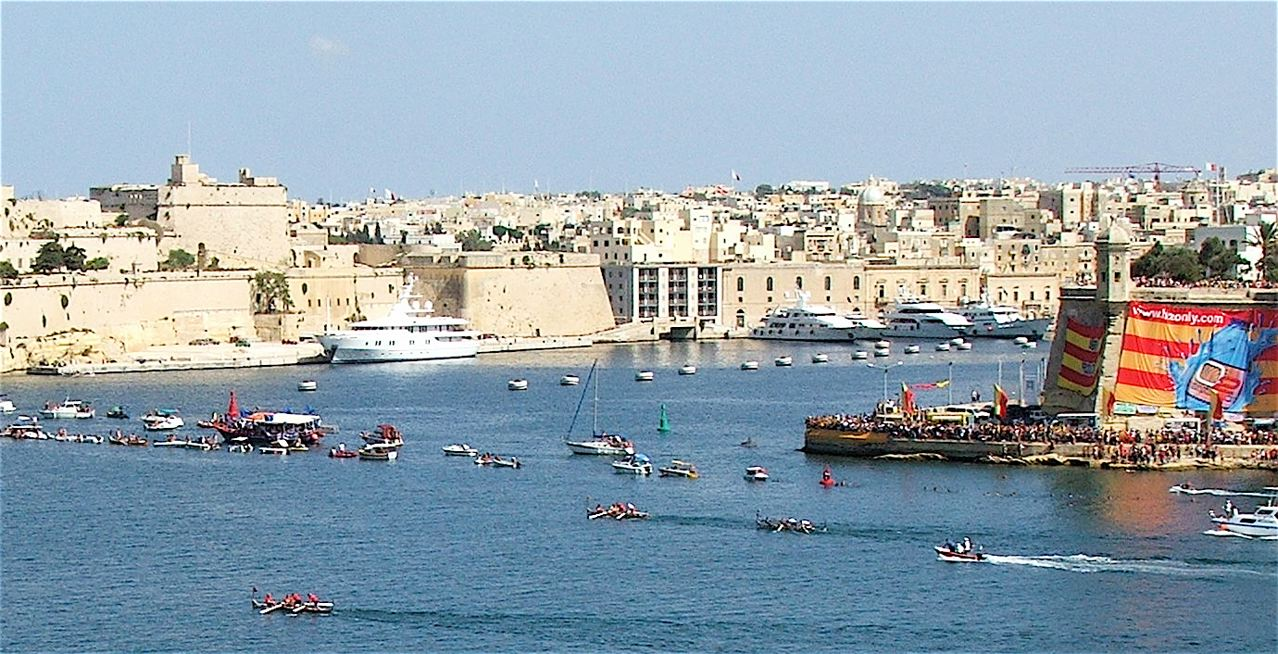
- The regatta on 8 September 2008
- Date: Bi-annually, 31 March and 8 September
- Location: Grand Harbour, Malta
- Event type: Head, 11 races
- Distance: 1,040 metres
- Website: www.maltarowing.com
- Participants: 8 clubs

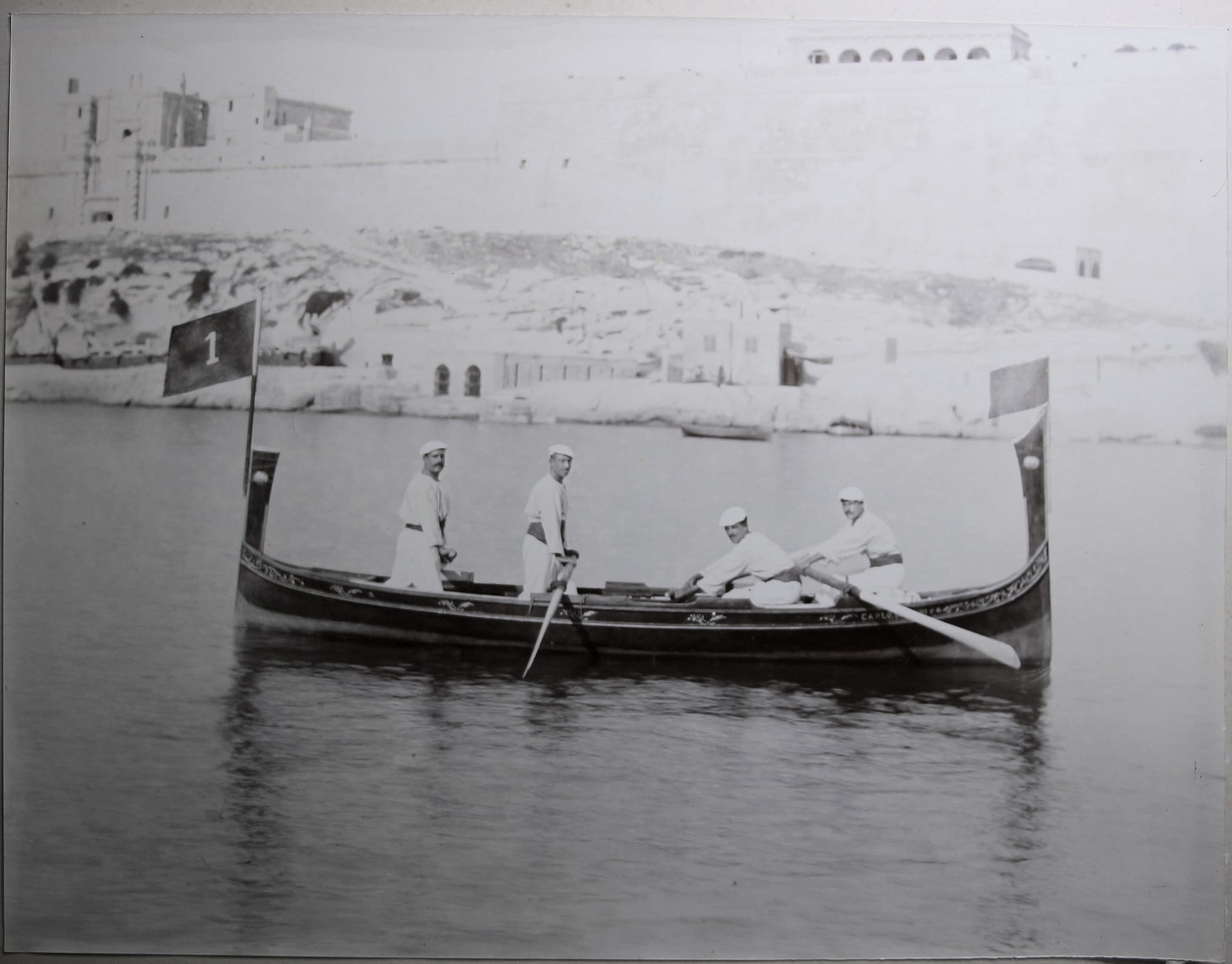
Winning team of a Maltese National Regatta around the year 1900. Photography by Thomas Fenech, Cospicua

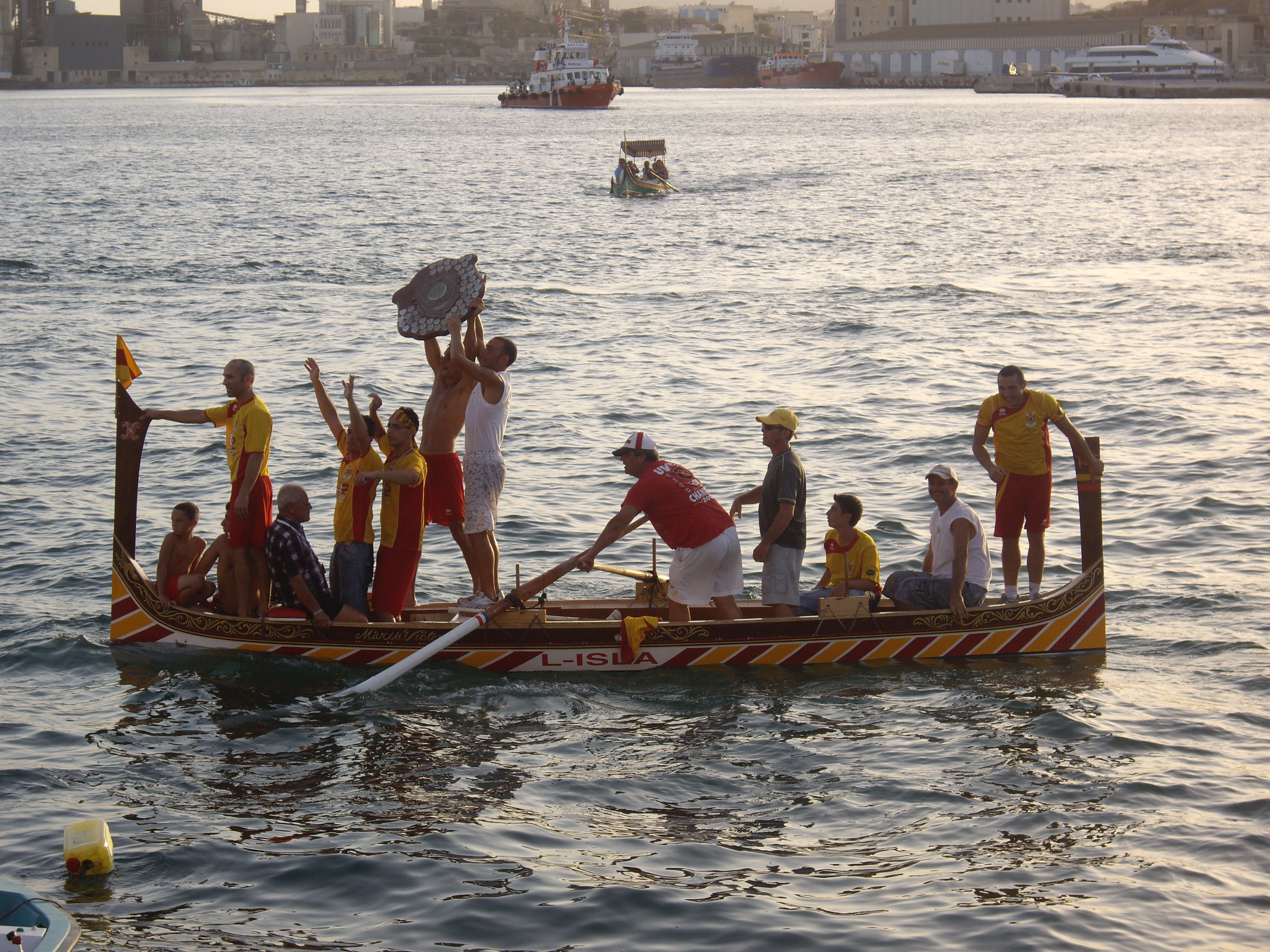
Senglea team, winners of the 2008 Maltese National Regatta

The Maltese National Regatta is a fixed-seat rowing regatta held bi-annually on 31 March Freedom Day to commemorate the withdrawal of the British troops and the Royal Navy from Malta and on 8 September Victory Day respectively. The Regatta pitches 8 participants against each other over 11 Malta Traditional Regatta Races of 1,040 meters each spanning two categories and the women race. The Regatta is held in the Grand Harbour and being a national event, it draws thousands of spectators year after year.

== Format of competition ==
Rowers from the eight different clubs compete in two categories. The 'Open' Category is dedicated to the more professional rowers whereas Category 'B' is intended for the more amateur rowers. Each category comprises five races and the club which obtains the highest number of points from the five races wins the respective category.

Each race features a different rowing boat and points are awarded to the first three placings. The number of points tends to vary from one race to another, with the largest number of points assigned to the last race, thus ensuring that the competition remains interesting to the very end.

On 8 September 2018 under the presidency of the then newly elected president Mr. Stephen Paris the women's race took place again after 40 years. For these races there is also a shield that is won by the winners and kept for a year.

== Participants and number of wins ==
Victory Day wins

- Senglea Regatta Club 24 wins
- Bormla Regatta Club 22 wins
- Marsa Regatta Club 14 wins
- Kalkara Regatta Club 7 wins
- Birgu Regatta Club 3 wins
- Marsamxett Regatta Club 2 wins
- Birżebbuġa Regatta Club 0 wins
- Siġġiewi Rowing Club 0 wins

Victory Day Category B wins

- Bormla Regatta Club 17 wins
- Senglea Regatta Club 6 wins
- Marsa Regatta Club 5 wins
- Marsamxett Regatta Club 3 wins
- Birgu Regatta Club 2 wins
- Birżebbuġa Regatta Club 2 wins
- Kalkara Regatta Club 1 win
- Siġġiewi Rowing Club 0 wins

Freedom Day Wins

- Bormla Regatta Club 14 wins
- Senglea Regatta Club 12 wins
- Marsa Regatta Club 11 wins
- Birgu Regatta Club 6 wins
- Marsamxett Regatta Club 4 wins
- Birżebbuġa Regatta Club 2 wins
- Kalkara Regatta Club 0 wins
- Siġġiewi Rowing Club 0 wins

Freedom Day Category B Wins

- Bormla Regatta Club 13 wins
- Senglea Regatta Club 7 wins
- Marsamxett Regatta Club 6 wins
- Birgu Regatta Club 4 wins
- Kalkara Regatta Club 3 wins
- Birżebbuġa Regatta Club 2 win
- Marsa Regatta Club 1 win
- Siġġiewi Rowing Club 0 wins

Women's Victory Day Wins

- Birgu Regatta Club 5 wins
- Senglea Regatta Club 1 wins
- Bormla Regatta Club 1 win
- Kalkara Regatta Club 1 win
- Birżebbuġa Regatta Club 0 wins
- Marsa Regatta Club 0 wins
- Marsamxett Regatta Club 0 wins
- Siġġiewi Rowing Club 0 wins

Women's Freedom Day Wins

- Birgu Regatta Club 3 wins
- Marsamxett Regatta Club 1 win
- Birżebbuġa Regatta Club 1 win
- Bormla Regatta Club 1 wins
- Kalkara Regatta Club 0 wins
- Senglea Regatta Club 0 wins
- Marsa Regatta Club 0 wins
- Siġġiewi Rowing Club 0 wins
