= Victory Day (Malta) =

Public holiday in Malta

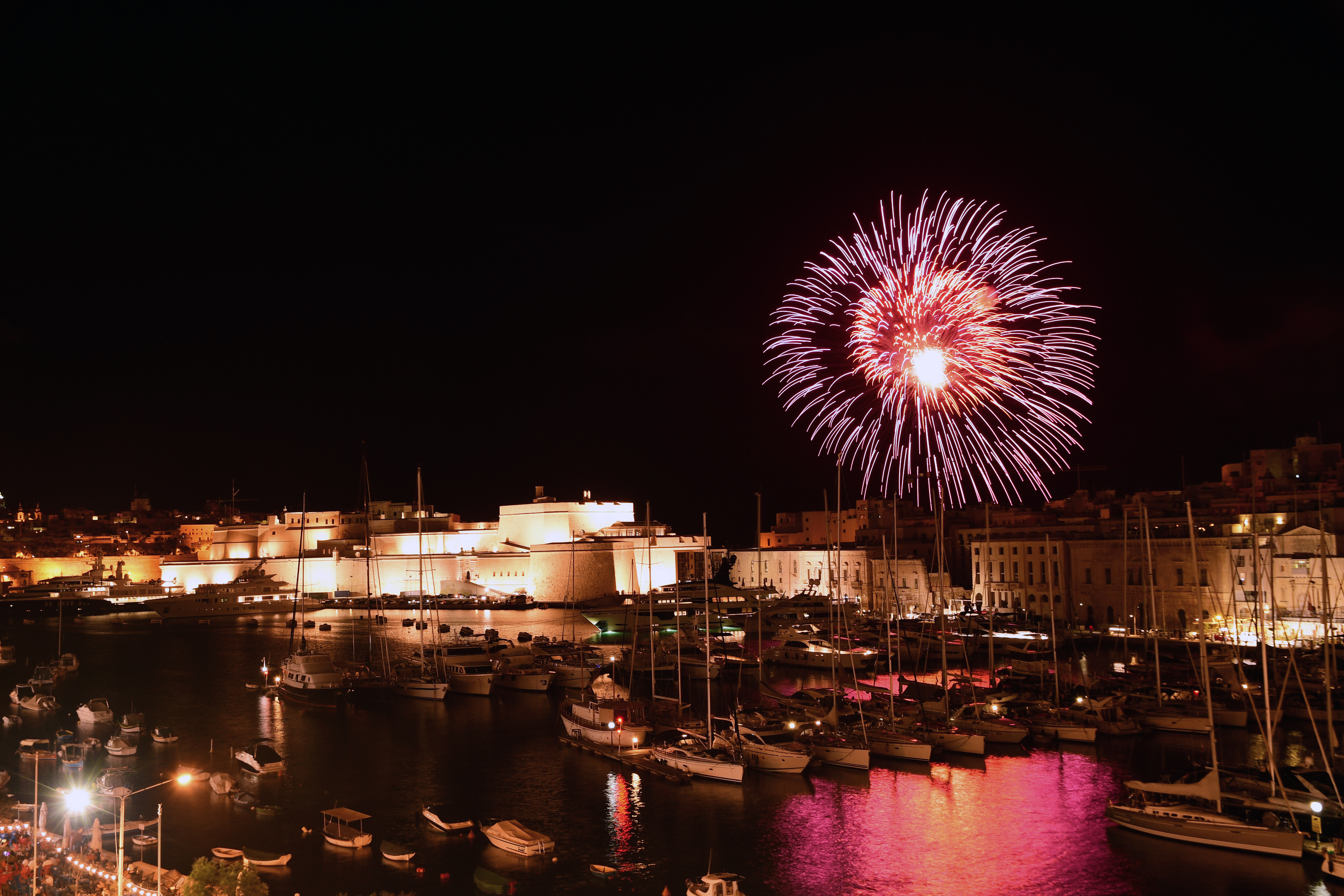
- Fireworks above Fort St. Angelo on Victory Day 2016, reminiscent of the bombings in World War II
- Also called: Il-Vitorja; Il-Bambina
- Observed by: Malta
- Significance: In remembrance of the victories in the sieges of Malta of 1565, 1800 and 1943
- Date: 8 September
- Next time: 8 September 2026
- Frequency: Annual

Victory Day (Maltese: Jum il-Vitorja) is a public holiday celebrated in Malta on 8 September and recalls the end of three historical sieges made on the Maltese archipelago – the Great Siege of Malta by the Ottoman Empire ending in 1565; the Siege of Malta by the French blockade ending in 1800; and the Siege of Malta during the Second World War by the Axis forces ending in 1943.

The day also coincides with the commemoration of the birth of the Virgin Mary, better known as the Nativity of Mary, which is celebrated in the villages of Senglea, Naxxar and Mellieħa on the island of Malta, and Xagħra in Gozo; and the death of Queen Elizabeth II, the last colonial-era Maltese head of state. It is locally known as il-Vitorja (the Victory), il-Bambina (the Baby), and Otto Settembre (Italian for "8 September"). The traditional regatta featuring boat races in the Grand Harbour is held on Victory Day.

== Events related to 8 September ==
On 7 September 1565, the Sicilian fleet Gran Soccorso, reached the Maltese shores to provide assistance to the Maltese, therefore setting back the Turkish invasion. The next day, after more than three months of siege, the Ottomans, who were besieging the suburbs of Birgu and Isla, retired their forces and left that region of the island. Despite battles continuing in the region of what today is St. Paul's Bay, it can be said that this date marked the last day of the Great Siege, which is considered one of the bloodiest in world history and the greatest siege in the history of Malta.

The surrender of French troops that had been occupying Malta to Emmanuele Vitale and Canon Francesco Saverio Caruana on 4 September 1800 is also a historical event related to the celebration taking place on this day.

The siege of Malta in the Second World War concluded in November 1942. During this time, Malta experienced a total of 3,000 bombing raids over a period of two years in an effort to destroy Royal Air Force defences and the ports. For enduring this, King George VI of the United Kingdom awarded the George Cross to the entire island and the design of the George Cross was incorporated into the Maltese flag.

On 8 September 1943, Italy withdrew from the war and ended hostilities against the Allies and turned against its former German ally. The Italian Prime Minister, Marshal Pietro Badoglio, read the statement that "The Italian Government, recognizing the impossibility of continuing the unequal struggle against the overwhelming power of the enemy, and with the object of avoiding further and more grievous harm to the nation, has requested an armistice from General Eisenhower ... This request has been granted. The Italian forces will, therefore, cease all acts of hostility against the Anglo-American forces wherever they may be met ..." U.S. Army General Dwight D. Eisenhower released the news of the unconditional surrender, "effective this instant", at the same time in a broadcast from Allied Headquarters in North Africa. The Italian fleet sailed to Malta to surrender.

== Activities ==
Cultural activities celebrating Victory Day take place on 7 September, in Great Siege Square in Valletta, and involve literary readings, music and artistic performances. On Victory Day, the Armed Forces of Malta parade on Republic Street, Valletta, and reach the Co-Cathedral of St. John, where they salute the Prime Minister and the Maltese anthem is finally played. A mass for the highest-ranking officers is held later on the day within the same temple. To mark the event, the President places a symbolic garland at the foot of the monument of the Great Siege to commemorate the victims of the World War.

The primary activity is a boat race organized by the Maltese Council for Sport (Maltese: Kunsill Malti għall-Isport), locally known as regatta, that takes place in the Grand Harbour, engaging the affiliated societies Cospicua, Vittoriosa, Birzebbuga, Marsa, Marsamxett, Kalkara and Isla. A number of boat races subdivided in two categories take place.

In Gozo, a commemorative ceremony is held in Independence Square in Rabat presided by the Minister for Gozo. The Armed Forces of Malta also involve themselves in a parade and finally place a wreath at the foot of the War Memorial dedicated to Christ the King of Jews.

The day is also connected to the Nativity of Mary, and feasts are celebrated in Xagħra, Naxxar, Senglea, and Mellieħa.

== See also ==
- Victory Day in other countries
