= Nigel Park =

New Zealand fighter pilot (1921–1942)

Nigel Manfred Park
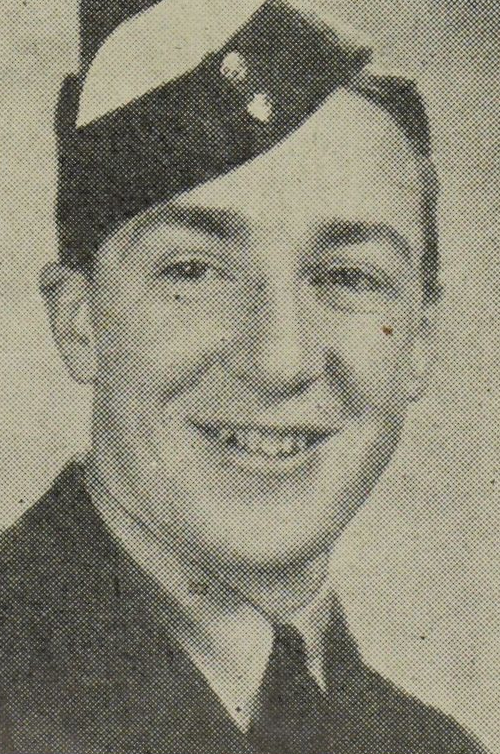
- Born: 6 March 1921; Gisborne, New Zealand
- Died: 25 October 1942 (aged 21)
- Burial place: No known grave
- Military career
- Allegiance: New Zealand
- Branch: Royal New Zealand Air Force
- Service years: 1941–1942 †
- Rank: Pilot Officer
- Units: No. 126 Squadron; No. 122 Squadron
- Conflicts: Second World War; Channel Front; Siege of Malta
- Awards: Distinguished Flying Medal

Nigel Manfred Park, DFM (6 March 1921 – 25 October 1942), was a New Zealand fighter pilot and flying ace of the Second World War. He was credited with having shot down at least ten aircraft.

Born in Gisborne, Park enlisted in the Royal New Zealand Air Force in May 1941. After receiving flight training in New Zealand and then Canada, he was sent to the United Kingdom to serve with the Royal Air Force. He briefly flew with No. 122 Squadron on the Channel Front before being sent as a reinforcement pilot to the island of Malta in July 1942. Posted to No. 126 Squadron, he had destroyed two enemy aircraft within two weeks of his arrival in Malta and had further successes over the next few months. He went missing, presumed killed, on operations on 25 October. He was posthumously awarded the Distinguished Flying Medal.

== Early life ==
Nigel Manfred Park was born in Gisborne, New Zealand, on 6 March 1921, the son of Manfred Park and his wife Christina née Ferguson. He was also a nephew of Keith Park, who would later command No. 11 Group in the Battle of Britain. Educated at Mangatu School and then Gisborne High School, he was a keen sportsman. After completing his education, he worked as a shepherd on his father's farm at Whatatutu.

== Second World War ==
Park joined the Royal New Zealand Air Force in May 1941, doing his initial training at Wereroa Station near Levin. He then proceeded to No. 2 Elementary Flying School and first flew solo on 27 June. He went to Canada in August for further flight training with the Royal Canadian Air Force at its No. 2 Service Flying Training School. He gained his wings in November and was promoted to sergeant the same month. He was sent to the United Kingdom to serve with the Royal Air Force and soon after his arrival there in December, went to No. 53 Operational Training Unit to learn to fly Supermarine Spitfire fighters. Afterwards, he was sent to join No. 122 Squadron, which was based at Hornchurch, making a number of offensive sorties across the English Channel to northern France from April to May 1942.

=== Malta ===
In June 1942, Park was sent to Gibraltar; he was to be posted to the island of Malta as a reinforcement pilot for its aerial defences. He travelled to Malta aboard the aircraft carrier HMS Eagle, which was transporting 32 Spitfires to the island in Operation Pinpoint. He flew his Spitfire off the carrier's flight deck and landed at Malta on 15 July. Posted to No. 126 Squadron, he was soon in action. On 28 July, he was part of a group that intercepted a raid mounted by three Junkers Ju 88 medium bombers. He claimed a share in one Ju 88, one of four pilots that engaged the aircraft, which crashed off Delimara. He then shot down a Messerschmitt Bf 109 fighter that was escorting the bombers. On 9 August, he was one of 22 Spitfires scrambled to intercept a group of Bf 109s approaching Malta. He shot down a Bf 109 over St. Paul's Bay despite his own aircraft receiving some damage to its wing during the engagement.

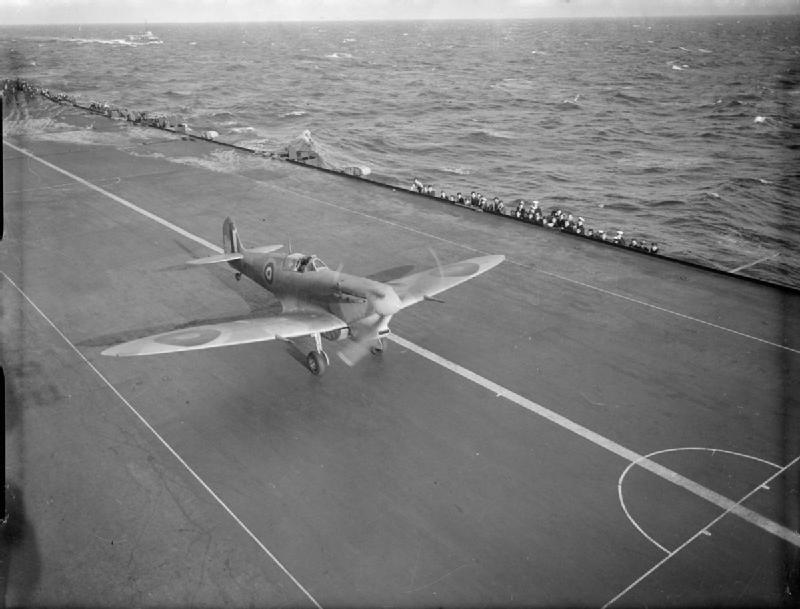
A Spitfire taking off from the flight deck of HMS Eagle, 1942

September was relatively quiet but the following month the Luftwaffe increased the intensity of its operations against Malta. Park's aircraft was damaged in an encounter on 10 October with a group of enemy fighters; despite his cannons having jammed, he was able to evade them and land back at the squadron's base at Takali. He had a series of more successful engagements over the following days: he damaged a Reggiane Re.2001 on 11 October, and the next day destroyed three Ju 88s, two in one sortie near Grand Harbour. Another Ju 88, which had just bombed the airfield at Takali, was shot down on 14 October along with a Bf 109. He destroyed another Bf 109 during a scramble to intercept another bombing raid in the afternoon.

Park was subject to an incident of friendly fire the next day when, while engaging some bomb-equipped Bf 109s, he was attacked by Spitfires, fortunately without damage. He shot down a Bf 109 about 12 miles (19 km) from Grand Harbour on 16 October but was shot down himself two days later when eight of No. 126 Squadron's aircraft were attacked by a dozen Bf 109s. He crash-landed his damaged Spitfire and received slight injuries. Having just been promoted to pilot officer, he failed to return from a sortie, his 65th, attempting to intercept an incoming bombing raid on 25 October. His flight commander, William Rolls, had observed him destroying a Bf 109 during the dogfight.

There was some confusion about whether Park was alive or not; one pilot believed that he had crashed into the sea while another thought he had bailed out. A search was mounted for him, but he was not located. Originally reported as missing, by July the following year he was presumed to be dead.

Park is credited with the destruction of ten enemy aircraft, a share in another aircraft destroyed, and one damaged. Following a recommendation by Rolls, Park was posthumously awarded the Distinguished Flying Medal (DFM); this was announced in The London Gazette on 3 April 1945 but with effect from the day before his presumed death. The citation for his DFM read:

Since July, 1942, Sergeant (later Pilot Officer) Park has destroyed at least 8 enemy aircraft. During the intensive fighting in Malta which commenced in October, 1942, he personally destroyed 3 enemy bombers and 2 fighters. With two other pilots, he made a head-on attack on a formation of seven Ju 88s shooting one down immediately and then, regardless of the danger from the escorting fighters, turned and destroyed a second Ju 88. Sergeant Park showed great enthusiasm to press home his attack whatever dangers had to be faced.

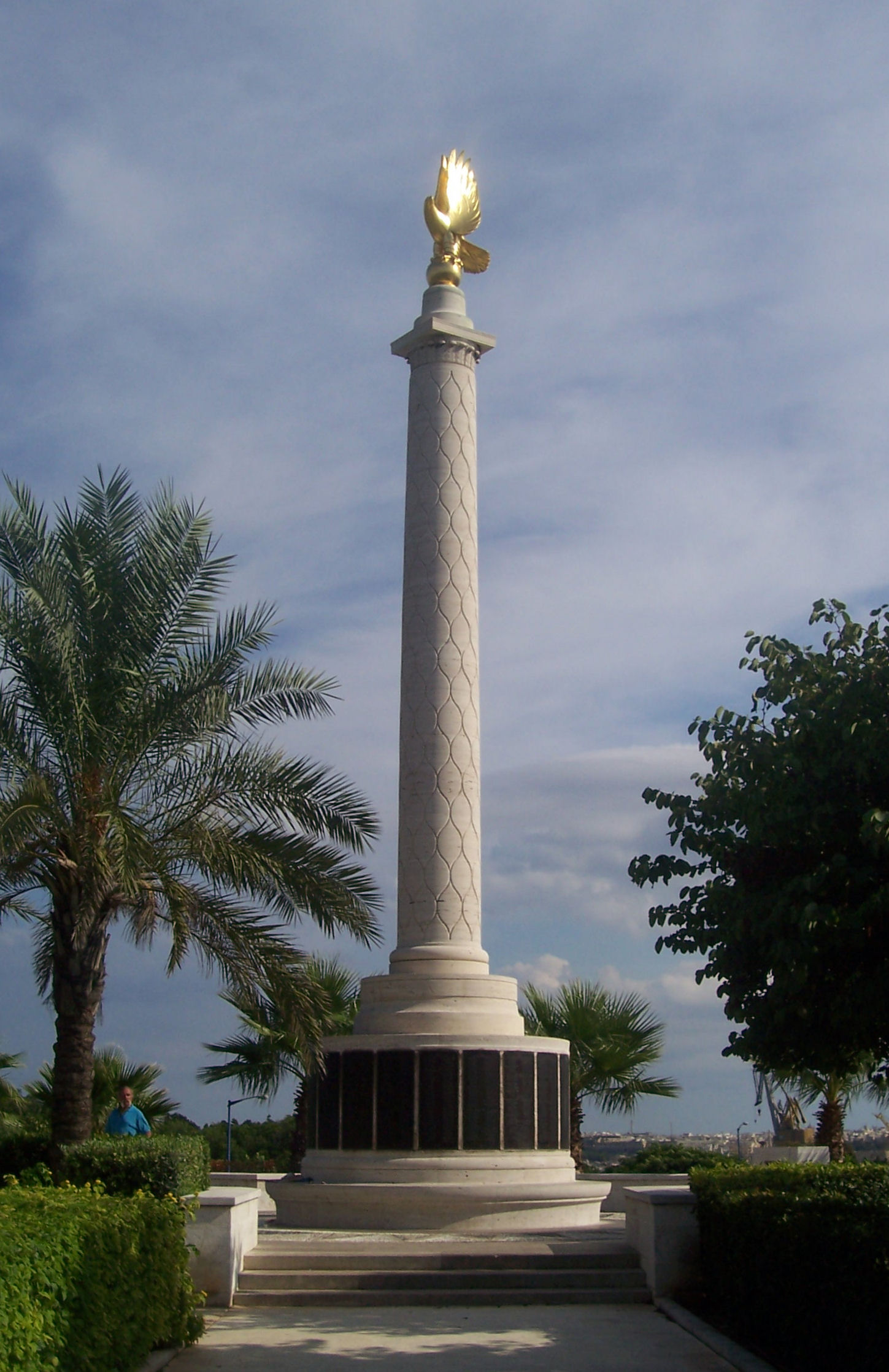
The Malta Memorial on which Park's name is listed

His name is recorded on the Malta Memorial, which commemorates the nearly 2,300 Commonwealth airmen who were killed over and around the Mediterranean.
