= William Rolls =

British flying ace (1914–1988)

- Born: 6 August 1914; Edmonton, London, United Kingdom
- Died: July 1988 (aged 73)
- Military career
- Allegiance: United Kingdom
- Branch: Royal Air Force Volunteer Reserve
- Rank: Flight Lieutenant
- Units: No. 126 Squadron; No. 122 Squadron; No. 72 Squadron
- Conflicts: Second World War: Battle of Britain; Channel Front; Battle of Malta
- Awards: Distinguished Flying Cross; Distinguished Flying Medal

William Thomas Edward Rolls DFC, DFM (6 August 1914 – July 1988) was a British flying ace of the Royal Air Force Volunteer Reserve (RAFVR) during the Second World War. He was credited with the destruction of at least 17 aircraft of the Axis powers.

From Edmonton in London, Rolls joined the RAFVR in 1939. Called up for service in the Royal Air Force (RAF) on the outbreak of the Second World War, he was posted to No. 72 Squadron in June 1940. He flew extensively during the Battle of Britain and destroyed a number of aircraft. After the battle, he performed instructing duties until late 1941 when he was posted to No. 122 Squadron and was part of several operations over the French coast. In mid-1942 he was sent to Malta, joining No. 126 Squadron. He shot down a number of aircraft before being hospitalised and repatriated to the United Kingdom as a consequence of injuries received during the aftermath of a bombing raid. Once recovered, he performed staff duties for the remainder of the war. Demobilised from the RAF in 1946, he subsequently worked for a number of government departments, including the Air Ministry. Suffering heart trouble, he died in July 1988.

== Early life ==
Born in Edmonton, London, on 6 August 1914, William Thomas Edward Rolls, known as Bill, was a scholarship student at The Latymer School. Once his education was completed, he worked as an engineering apprentice in a family member's company and as a sideline, made leather goods. He enlisted in the Royal Air Force Volunteer Reserve in March 1939, training at No. 19 Elementary and Reserve Flying Training School at Gatwick and qualifying for his pilot's wings four months later. By this time, he was married.

== Second World War ==
On the outbreak of the Second World War, Rolls was called up for service in the Royal Air Force (RAF) as a sergeant pilot. He underwent further training, at No. 3 Flying Training School in South Cerney and once this was completed in June 1940, he was posted to No. 72 Squadron. His unit operated Supermarine Spitfire fighters from Acklington, in Northumberland, but at the end of August it moved to Biggin Hill, where it would be heavily involved in the Battle of Britain.

=== Battle of Britain ===
Biggin Hill was a station under the control of No. 11 Group, which bore the brunt of the British aerial defence against the increasing attacks of the Luftwaffe (German Air Force). Within two days of No. 72 Squadron's arrival at Biggin Hill, Rolls shot down two German aircraft, a Messerschmitt Bf 110 heavy fighter and a Dornier Do 17 medium bomber, over Kent. Then, on 4 September, he shot down a pair of Junkers Ju 87 divebombers, also over Kent. Another Do 17 was destroyed on 11 September and a second Do 17 was credited as being probably destroyed after Rolls initially claimed it as damaged. His Spitfire was damaged in a dogfight the next day, with bullets passing through the cockpit area close to his chest.

On 14 September Rolls shot down a Messerschmitt Bf 109 fighter in an engagement near Canterbury, the German aircraft going on to crash at Bethersden. After an encounter a few days earlier resulted in more damage to his Spitfire, he shot down another Bf 109 on 20 September. This proved to be his last victory in the Battle of Britain as he went on leave the next day. His squadron commander recommended him for the Distinguished Flying Medal (DFM), and this was duly announced in The London Gazette in November. The published citation read:

This airman, after very short experience of operational flying, has taken his place with the best war pilots in the squadron. In each of his first two engagements he shot down two enemy aircraft and has in all destroyed at least six.

— The London Gazette, No. 34987, 8 November 1940

Rolls spent the next several months resting from operational flying and performing instructing duties, firstly at No. 58 Operational Training Unit (OTU) at Grangemouth and then No. 61 OTU in Heston. This relatively restful period was tarnished by the death of his daughter, born in early 1940, from a heart issue. He returned to operations in October 1941, being posted to No. 122 Squadron, based in Yorkshire. In April of the following year, the squadron moved to Hornchurch where it took part in offensive operations to France. By this time he was a pilot officer, having been promoted on 6 January 1942. He destroyed a Focke-Wulf Fw 190 fighter on 17 March while flying over Saint-Omer and was also credited with a probable Fw 190. On 2 June, he helped shoot down a further Fw 190, sharing the confirmed credit with another pilot, near Le Crotoy. He was also credited with the probable destruction of an Fw 190.

=== Malta ===
In late June Rolls was posted to RAF Debden in preparation for a posting to Malta, where he was to join part of the island's aerial defences. He was involved in testing whether a Spitfire could be flown off the deck of an aircraft carrier, HMS Furious; his suggestion of fitting a hydromatic propeller proved crucial to the aircraft's ability to achieve the feat. Furious subsequently carried a load of Spitfires and pilots, Rolls among them, for reinforcement of Malta's fighter squadrons, sailing from Greenock in Scotland in late July, bound for Gibraltar. The aircraft carrier departed Gibraltar on 10 August and the following day, Rolls led a flight of seven Spitfires off the deck of the aircraft carrier and onto Malta. He was posted to No. 126 Squadron and was soon in action; on 13 August while patrolling over a shipping convoy during Operation Pedestal, he was credited with destroying a Junkers Ju 88 medium bomber that was attacking the oil tanker SS Ohio. However, aviation historians Christopher Shores and Clive Williams note that this may be a half share, as it is possible that the commander of the squadron, Squadron Leader Bryan Wicks, inflicted damage on the Ju 88 as well. Later in the month, Roll was made a flight commander in the squadron.

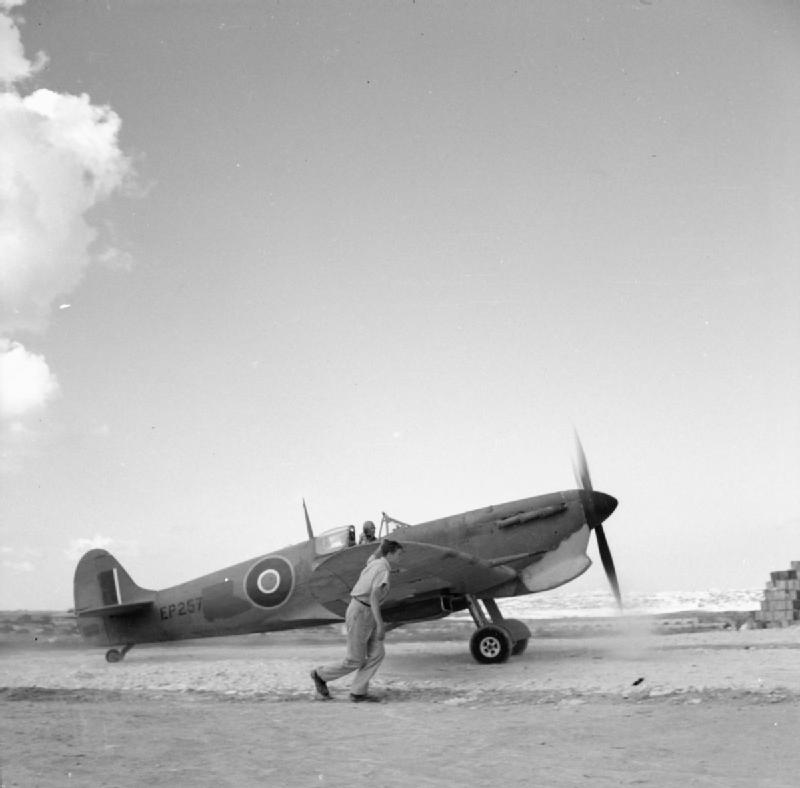
A Spitfire of No. 126 Squadron taxiing on the runway at Luqa, Malta

On 19 September, Rolls and his wingman flew to the Sicilian coast, seeking out E-boats. Approaching Syracuse, he saw the wake of what he assumed was an E-boat but as he flew closer to attack, he realised it was a Dornier Do 24 flying boat that had just taken off. He promptly engaged and destroyed it. The Axis powers stepped up their aerial offensive against Malta in October, with a number of Luftwaffe units transferred to Sicily and North Africa for this purpose. Rolls, promoted to flying officer at the start of the month, was one of several pilots scrambled in the afternoon of 11 October to deal with an incoming raid mounted by 16 Ju 88s that were escorted by over 40 fighters of the Regia Aeronautica (Italian Air Force). He destroyed one Reggiane Re.2001 fighter and damaged another but was attacked in turn; despite his engine being struck by bullets, he safely returned to the squadron's base at Luqa. He shot down a Ju 88 early the next morning over Grand Harbour but in the same engagement, the squadron's commander, Wicks, was killed. Later in the morning, on a second scramble, he engaged two Macchi C.202 fighters near Gozo; he saw one blow up midair and gained hits on the other. The latter was claimed as probably destroyed but he was subsequently credited with the confirmed destruction of both aircraft as two C.202s were seen to have gone down in the sea.

On 25 October Rolls was leading a flight that engaged Italian bombers and escorting C.202s. His aircraft was damaged in the ensuing encounter and one of his pilots, Nigel Park, failed to return. Rolls and other pilots carried out a search and rescue operation but were unable to locate Park, who was subsequently deemed to have been killed. According to another pilot, Rolls had earlier recommended Park for a DFM. The next day, Rolls was flying one of eight aircraft of No. 126 Squadron that intercepted around 35 Bf 109s 25 miles (40 km) out from Malta, breaking up the formation. Rolls then patrolled off Filfla and engaged two Bf 109s that he saw diving on Luqa. One was confirmed as destroyed.

The intensity of aerial operations eased in November for Malta's fighter pilots but during the month Rolls suffered a broken leg when the wall of a building, damaged during a bombing raid, fell on him. While in hospital in Malta, he reported meeting the pilot of one of the Ju 88s he had shot down the previous month. Rolls was repatriated to England for treatment and during his return flight, the Consolidated PBY Catalina flying boat on which he was travelling ran out of fuel. It had to put down off the Welsh coast and was towed to port by a destroyer of the Royal Navy. During his hospitalisation at the Royal Naval Hospital in Swansea, his award of a Distinguished Flying Cross (DFC) was announced in The London Gazette. The recommendation for the DFC noted his "outstanding leadership" and "great courage and skill".

=== Later war service ===
On recovering from his injuries, Rolls was posted to the Air Ministry where he was involved in publicising the RAF's efforts in the war. He gave a number of talks for the "Wings for Victory" fundraising drive. In September 1943, he went to Manby where he commenced a training course at the Air Armament School. On completion of the course in the spring of 1944, he was transferred to the headquarters of No. 12 Group as a specialist in armaments. By this time, he held the rank of flight lieutenant, having been promoted at the start of the year.

In late 1944, Rolls was posted to the Bombing Analysis Unit and his work saw him based in France from June the following year. He subsequently spent a period of time attached to the United States Air Evaluation Board. He ended the war credited with having shot down 17 aircraft with a share in another aircraft destroyed. He is also credited with three probably destroyed and two damaged.

== Later life ==
Demobilised in January 1946, in civilian life Rolls worked for the public service, firstly with the Ministry of Works as a film officer. He then worked for the Department of Scientific and Industrial Research, based at the organisation's headquarters in London. His role here was as an exhibitions officer, organising events at Olympia and Earl's Court. In 1960 he took a position at the Air Ministry as a senior information officer, producing over 150 training films for the RAF. After eight years, he was appointed director of the Directorate of Training Films Requirements. He retired in September 1975 due to poor health. He died in July 1988, having suffered heart trouble for some time. Prior to his death, his memoirs were published as Spitfire Attack.

In 2008, his son put his medals, which in addition to the DFC and DFM also included the 1939-45 Star with Battle of Britain clasp, Air Crew Europe Star with France and Germany clasp, Africa Star with North Africa 1942-43 clasp, the Defence and War Medals and Air Efficiency Award, up for auction in and they fetched £90,000. The medals are presently owned by Lord Michael Ashcroft.
