= Ġ.F. Abela Junior College =

Maltese further education college

- Type: Public
- Established: 1 October 1995; 30 years ago
- Parent institution: University of Malta
- Principal: Paul Xuereb
- Students: c. 2000
- Location: Msida, Malta; 35°53′33.6″N 14°29′20.4″E
- Campus: Urban
- Website: www.jc.um.edu.mt

Ġ.F. Abela Junior College, commonly known as the Junior College (JC), is a further education college in Msida, Malta, which prepares students for the Matriculation Certificate. It was established in 1995 by the University of Malta. It is named after the 17th-century Maltese historian Giovanni Francesco Abela.

Students may choose from a range of subjects and must take two subjects at Advanced Level, three at Intermediate Level, as well as Systems of Knowledge. Since the college forms part of the University of Malta, students are able to become familiar with the university campus. College and university students collaborate on cultural projects such as concerts, drama, sport, student exchanges, debates and seminars.

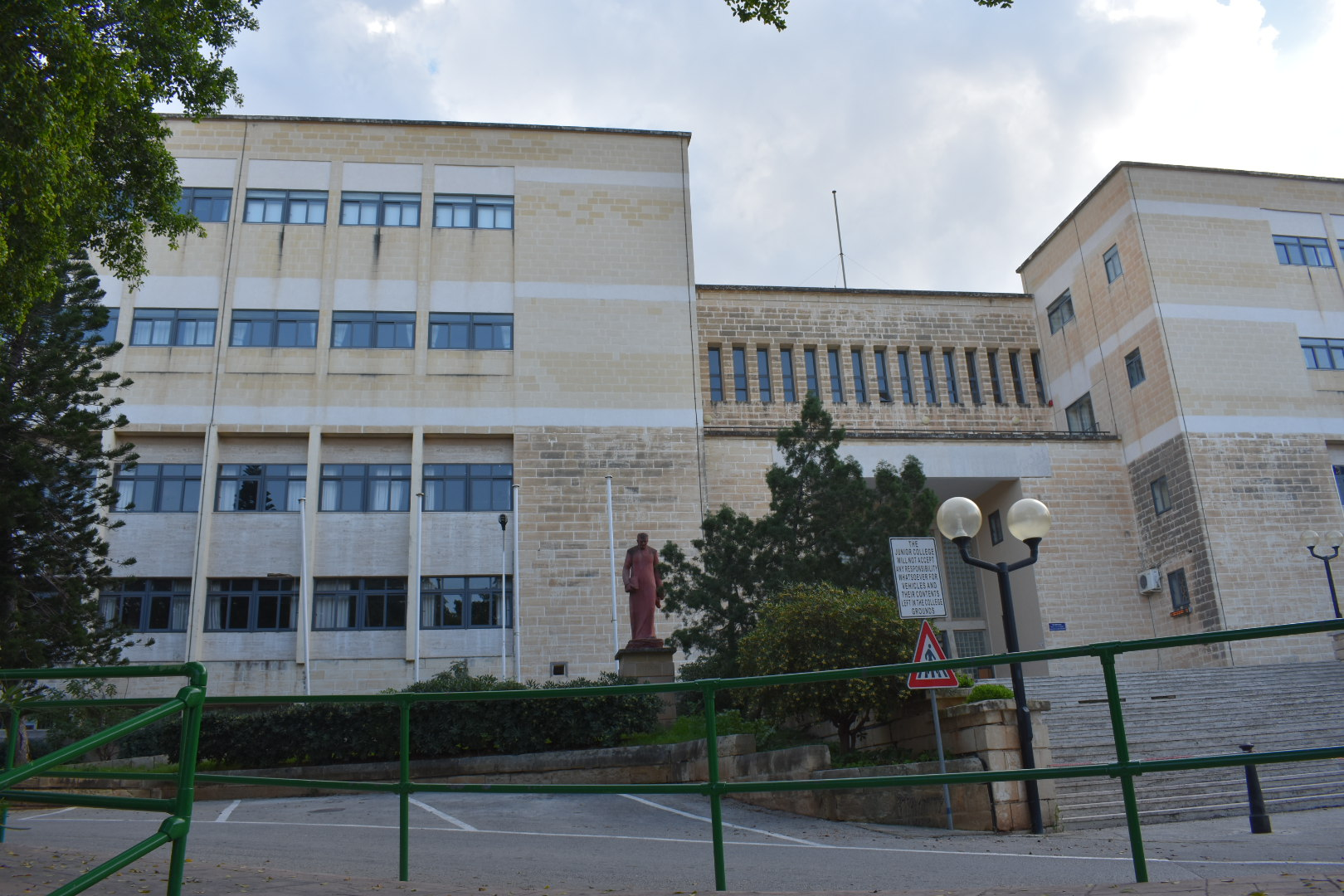
The Junior College building in 2017

The Junior College is housed in a Modernist building which was constructed between 1962 and 1966 as the Malta College of Arts, Science and Technology to designs of Victor Anastasi.

== College Board ==
The college is governed by a board composed of:

- The rector of the University of Malta, or his delegate as chairman
- The principal
- The vice principal
- The five area co-ordinators
- Two members representing the academic staff
- Two members representing the students
- Two members appointed by the Minister of Education
- Three members appointed by the Senate of the university from the Humanities area, the Sciences area and a student representative on Senate
- The chairman of the MATSEC Board.
- The secretary
