= Tritons' Fountain =

Public fountain, Floriana, Malta

- Il-Funtana tat-Tritoni (Maltese)
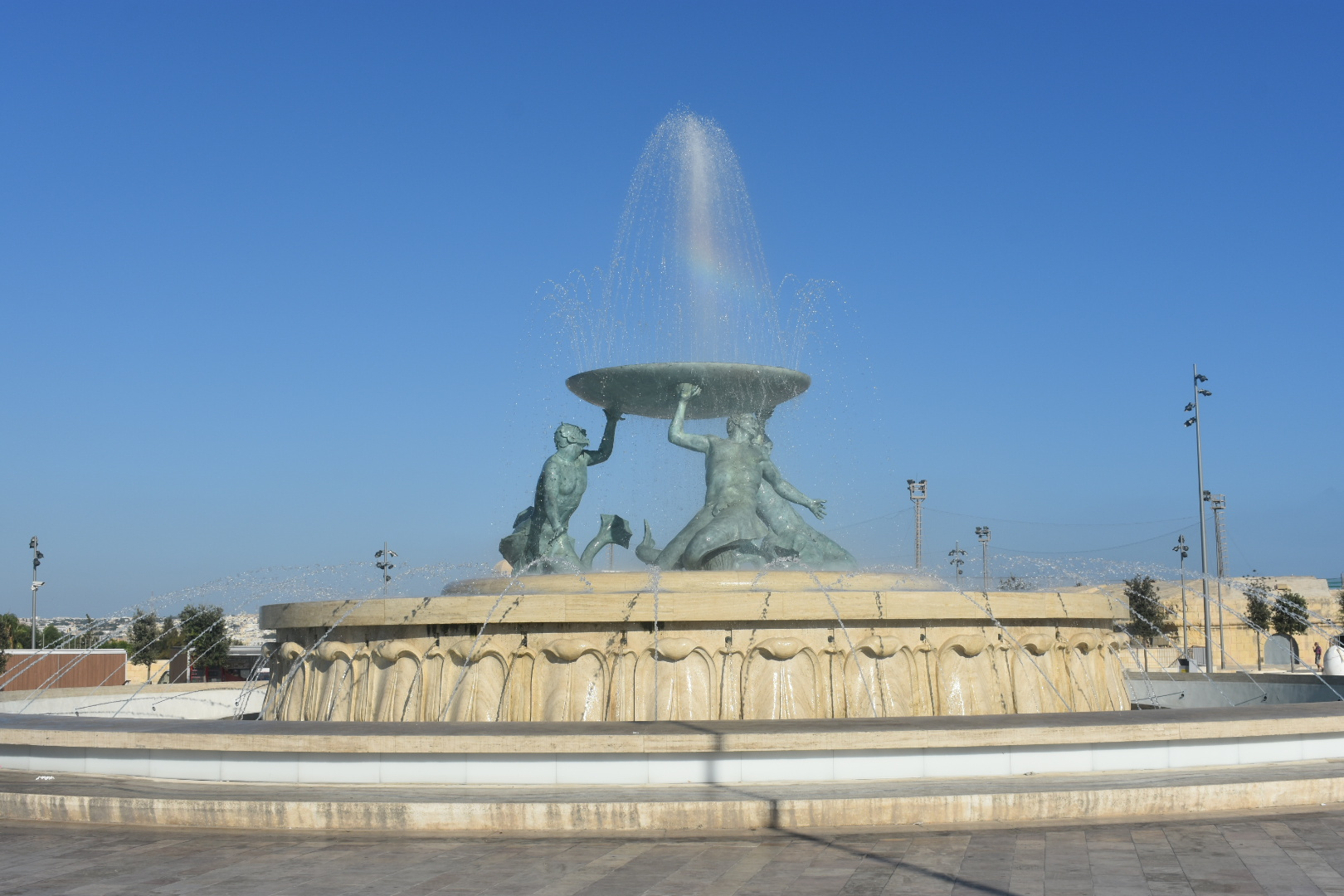
- Triton Fountain in 2018
- Artists: Vincent Apap; Victor Anastasi
- Completion date: 16 May 1959
- Type: Public fountain
- Medium: Bronze, concrete and travertine
- Movement: Modernism
- Subject: Tritons
- Condition: Restored
- Location: Floriana, Malta; 35°53′44.3″N 14°30′29.8″E

The Tritons' Fountain (Maltese: Il-Funtana tat-Tritoni) is a fountain located in Floriana, Malta. It consists of three bronze Tritons holding up a large basin, balanced on a concentric base built out of concrete and clad in 730 tons of travertine slabs. The fountain is one of Malta's most important Modernist landmarks.

Designed and constructed between 1952 and 1959 under three governing bodies, and conceived jointly by eminent sculptor Chevalier Vincent Apap and his collaborator draughtsman Victor Anastasi, the fountain became unofficially operational on Saturday 16 May 1959. The fountain was used as a stage for National Celebrations named 'Mill-Maltin għall-Maltin' and is believed to have jeopardized the relatively compromised structural setup of the sculptural group and consequently contributed to the dramatic collapse of the sculptural group which occurred on Wednesday 1 March 1978 at approximately 14:00hrs.

The sculptural group was repaired by Malta Drydocks engineers between January 1986 and April 1987. During this intervention a central sculptural addition consisting of three seagulls and seaweed (also the work of Chev. Apap) was introduced within the sculptural group, however this arrangement subsequently diminished the telamonic role of the mythological Triton figures.

The fountain deteriorated in subsequent decades, and was earmarked for relocation in 2010 when the Heritage Planning Unit of the Planning Authority through its Conservation Officer Kenneth Cauchi advised that the monumental fountain would be best left in situ and any efforts were to be aimed and restoring the whole structure to its original form and reinstate the sculptural group in its dramatic carrying role of the ponderous basin. Much efforts and meetings were undertaken with Minister of Infrastructure, Communication and Transport Dr. Austin Gatt who stopped all proposals of relocating the fountain in a Press Conference dated 9 December 2011. The proposal by Mr. Cauchi was put forward to be addressed by the Minister of Resources and Rural Affairs George Pullicino who put forward the proposal through his Permanent Secretary Ing. Christopher Ciantar and Architect Norbert Gatt. Eventually the project passed forward by the Head of the Rehabilitation Projects Office (RPO) Chief Architect Mireille Fsadni and under the new Minister of the Ministry of Transport and Infrastructure (MTI) Joe Mizzi and under the new Permanent Secretary Ing Joseph Callus who was instrumental in setting up a technical steering group to address the proposed project by Mr. Cauchi. The team was chaired by Ing. Stefan Calamatta and was made up of Architect Fsadni to cover the civil and structural parts, Mr. Cauchi to cover the historical, artistic and bronze and travertine conservation aspects, Ing Brian Cauchi and Ing Alex Vella (obit. 2023) to cover the mechanical and hydraulic aspects, Ing Conrad Casha and Ing Simon Ellul to address the electrical aspects.

Following the general election of 2017, the project passed under a new Ministry Transport, Infrastructure and Capital Projects (MTIP) with Dr. Ian Borg as Minister and Permanent Secretary Mr. Christopher Cutajar who saw to the undertaking of the project proposed by Mr. Cauchi. The contract for works was entered upon on 12 January 2017 and commencing on site at the end of January when the bronze figures were dismantled and sent to Fonderia Artistica Ferdinando Marinelli of Florence. Works were ready by the end of the year, and the fountain and piazza were officially inaugurated on 12 January 2018, precisely a year to date from the signing of the contract. The Project Manager was Ing Joseph Scicluna who was instrumental to bring the project to a satisfactory conclusion while the Site Manager was Joseph Mifsud.

== Design ==
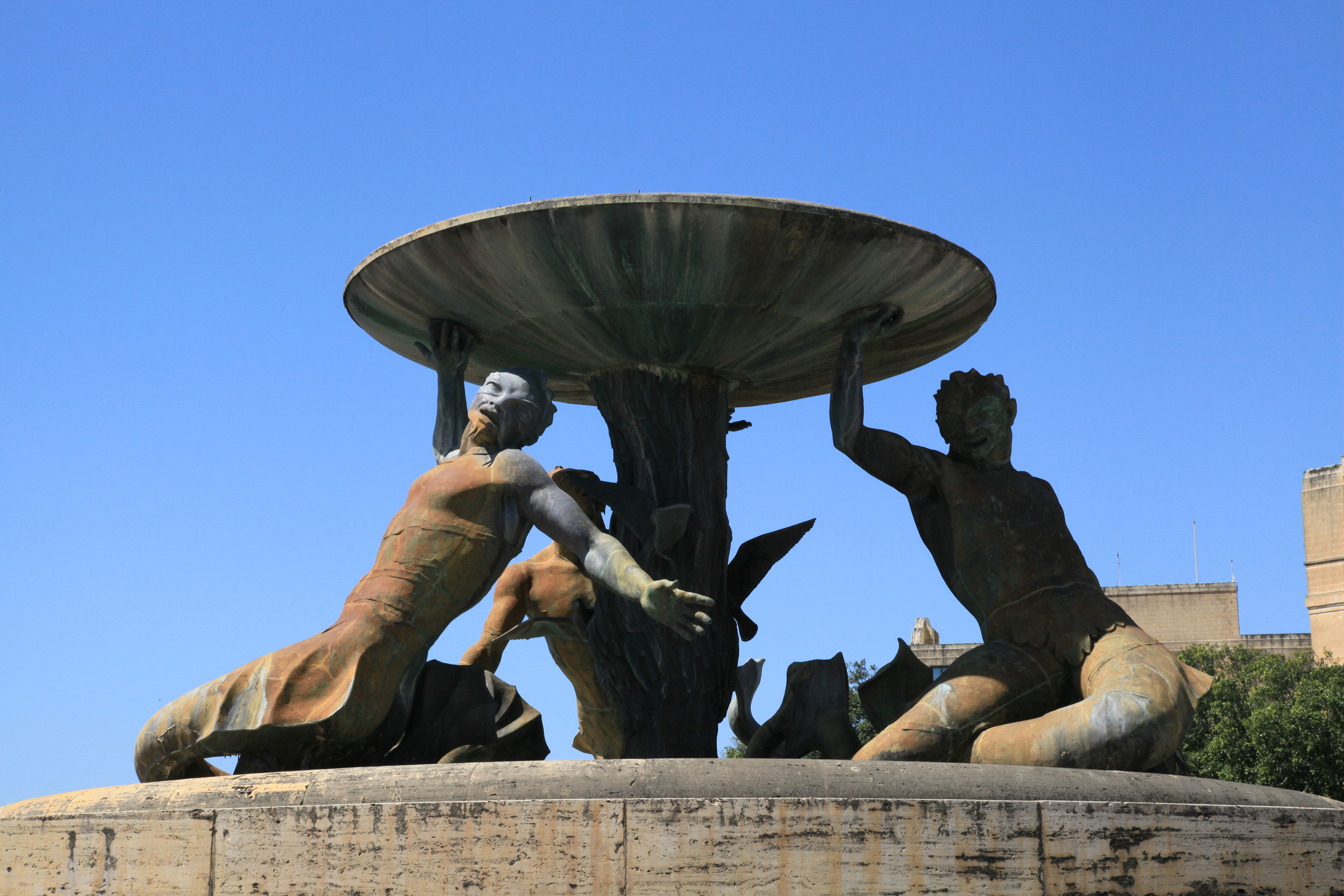
Close-up of the three Tritons

The fountain consists of three bronze figures of mythological Tritons holding up a huge circular basin measuring 5m in diameter and weighing approximately 3tons. Two of the Tritons are sitting, while the third one is kneeling, and they are balanced on a seaweed base. The face of each Triton is visible when viewed from City Gate. Their posture gives a sense of strength as well as spiral movement, which contribute to the monumentality of the fountain. The water jets were also designed in order to convey the sense of movement. The figures of the Tritons represent Malta's links with the sea, and their design was inspired by the Fontana delle Tartarughe in Rome. After the fountain's platter was damaged in the 1980s, a bronze pillar depicting a flight of seagulls was added to the fountain to support its weight. This was not included once the restoration was completed in 2018.

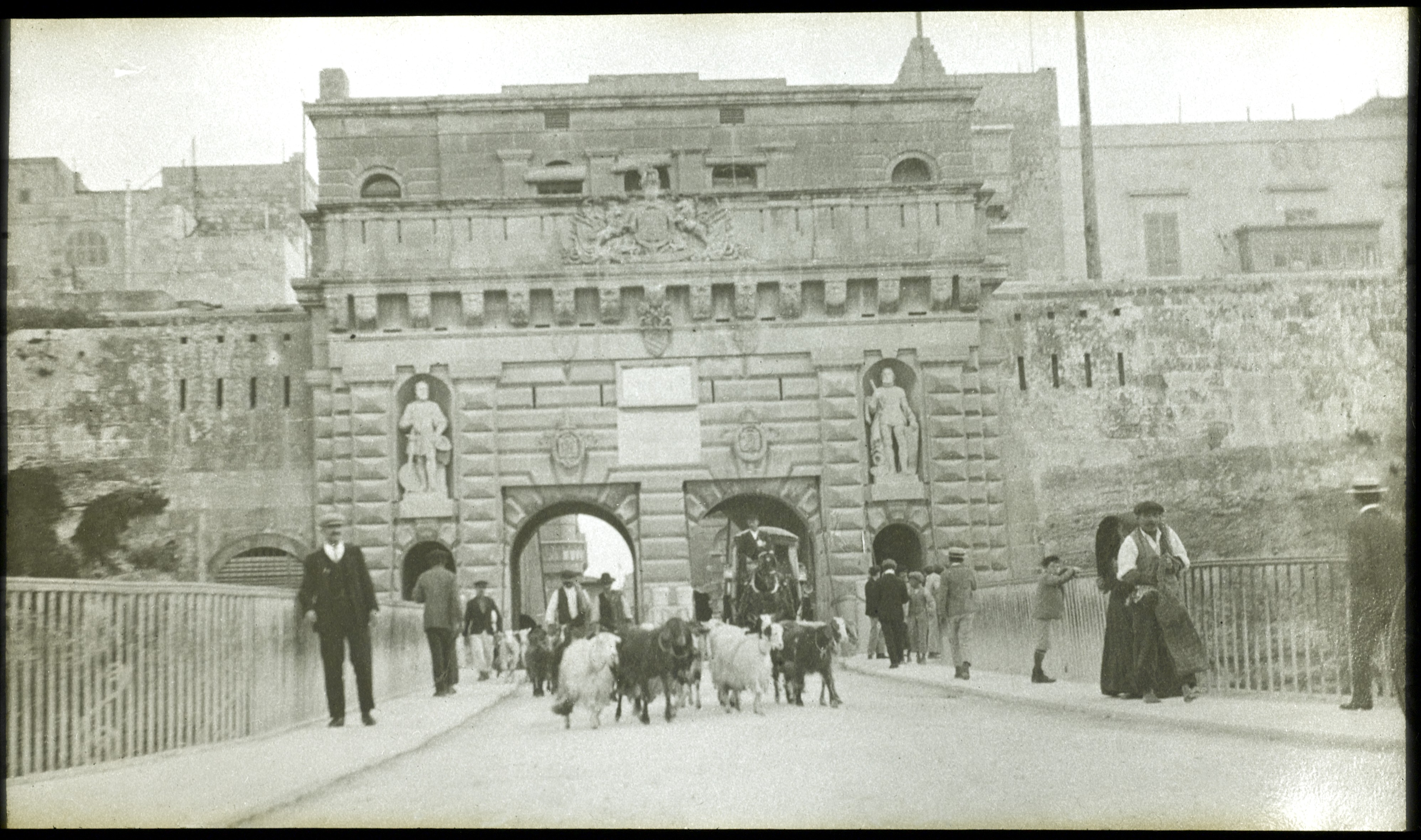
The fountain was designed to blend in with Kingsgate (pictured in the 1900s), which was demolished in 1964

The base of the fountain was originally designed with a quadripartite plan inspired by Rome's Fontana delle Naiadi, but this was later changed to a tripartite concentric plan. The base is constructed out of reinforced concrete, and it consists of four concentric water basins. The exterior is clad with a total of 730 tons of travertine slabs from Rome. The outer slabs of the vasca intermedia are decorated with a relief representing foliage.

Beneath the structure of the fountain, there are a series of passages and chambers which allow for maintenance and inspection and connect the fountain to the water and electrical services. These underground passages and a pump room cover an area of over 140 m^{2} (1,500 sq ft), and are accessible through a manhole in the pavement near the fountain.

The fountain was designed so as to avoid contrast with the nearby bastions, as well as to blend with the Victorian-era Kingsgate. The gate was demolished five years after the fountain was completed.

== Background and construction ==
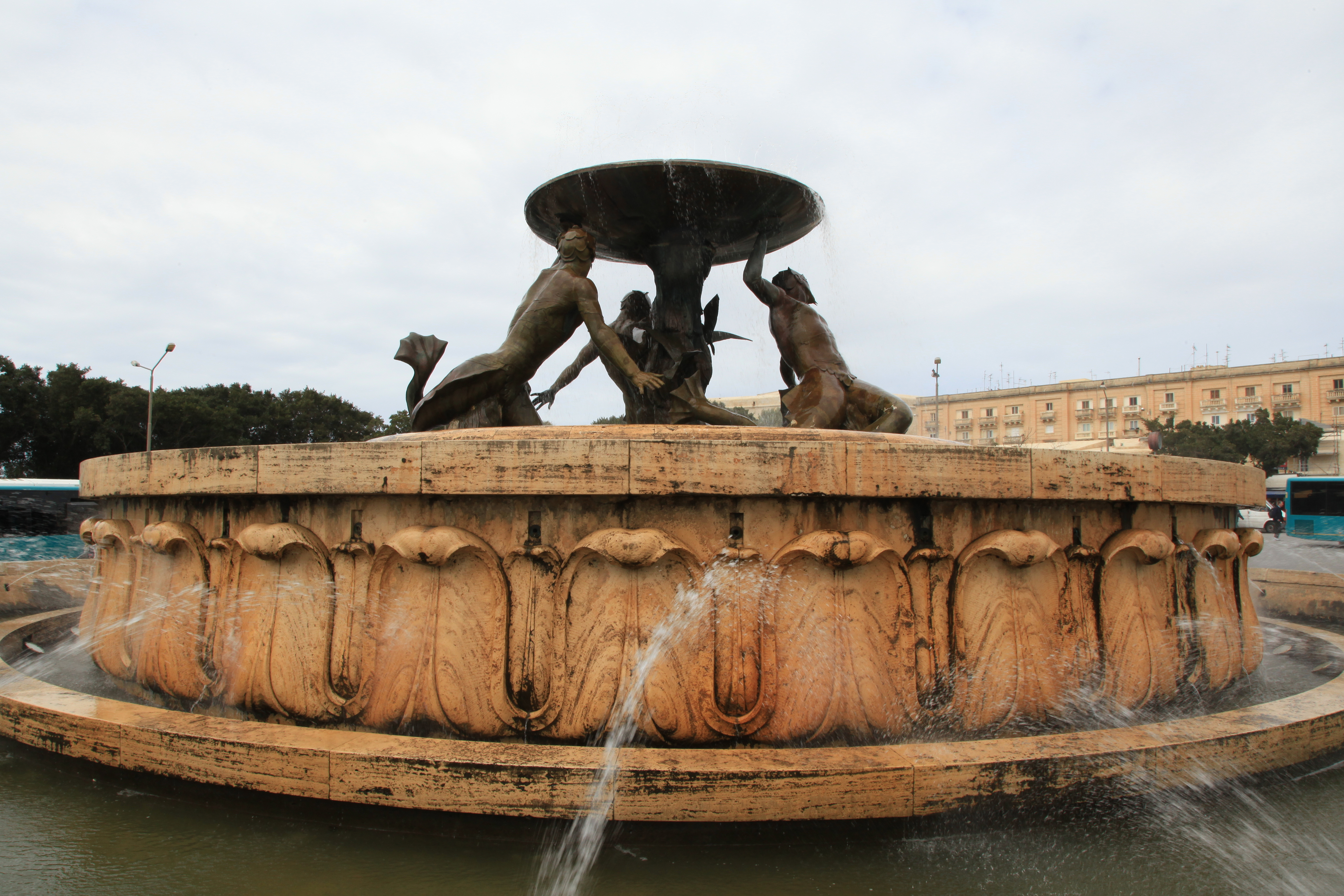
View of the fountain showing the reliefs on the travertine base

The site of the fountain was formerly occupied by St. Madeleine's Lunette, a 17th-century lunette that protected the entrance to Valletta. The lunette was dismantled and its ditch was filled in with rubble in the 19th century, although some parts might have survived beneath the present street level. The area was eventually used as a bus terminus, and in January 1953 the Ministry for Public Works and Reconstruction launched a competition for designing a fountain in this empty space. The competition was open to everyone except for those who worked at the Public Works Department, and the first prize was of £100.

The winning proposal was entitled "Triton", and it was submitted by the sculptor Vincent Apap. It was designed in collaboration with the draughtsman and designer Victor Anastasi, who was not mentioned on the proposal since he was employed by the PWD. Apap worked on the sculpture of three Tritons in stucco at a former dovecote in Palazzo Parisio, which had been made available by his friend, the marquis Joe Scicluna. Meanwhile, Anastasi worked on the technical and architectural elements of the fountain, including the hydraulic systems, and costs and supplies of materials.

Work on the fountain's foundations began in June 1955 by the contractor Carmelo Grech, and construction of the base was complete by mid-1958. The figures of the Tritons were cast in bronze at the Lagana foundry in Naples, and were put in place in 1959. The total cost of construction was around £80,000. The fountain was switched on for the first time on 16 May 1959, but it was never officially inaugurated due to the uneasy political situation at the time, as Malta's government had just resigned and the islands were under direct colonial rule.

== Damage and repair ==
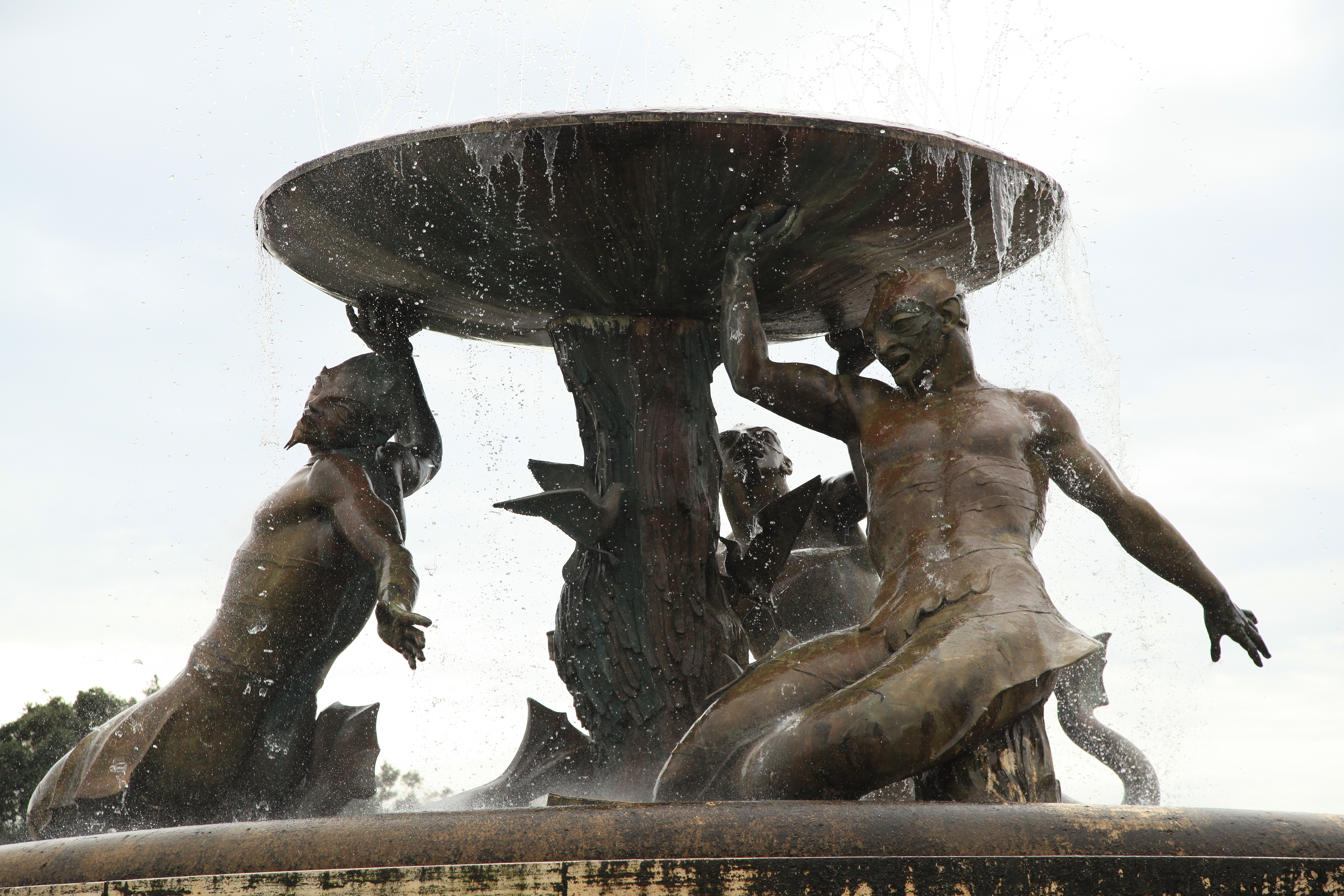
View of the fountain showing the central pillar, added in 1986 and removed in 2017

In the decades after its construction, the fountain became a landmark due to its prominent location in Malta's main bus terminus. It was used for various events, including the Republic Day national festivities which were televised on the programme Mill-Maltin għall-Maltin. A platform was built on the fountain's sculptural group to house entertainment acts which included concerts as well as motorcycles climbing on the bronze basin over specially-constructed ramps. This greatly weakened the structure, and together with natural deterioration, it resulted in the tank mounted inside the basin failing to limit the water supported inside. This caused an excessive amount of water to remain in the platter, which strained the bronze Triton figures supporting it. One of the Tritons' arms broke on 1 March 1978, and the platter collapsed resulting in significant damage to two of the three Tritons.

In 1986, the basin and damaged figures were repaired at the Malta Drydocks, and a central pillar was added to support the weight of the platter. Water no longer passed through the Tritons' arms, but through a pipe in this pillar. The fountain was functional on 1 May 1987, and repairs cost around Lm10,000. The central pillar was designed by Apap himself, even though he was against this repair work, and it was cast in bronze in Verona. These interventions have been called "inartistic" and have been widely criticized as destroying the fountain's original harmony.

In the late 1990s, the fountain's water and lighting systems were refurbished by the Malta Desalination Services and the Water Works Division.

Over time, further deterioration to the sculpture occurred, including corrosion and cracks in the figures. In 2017, Minister Joe Mizzi stated that the bronze figures had deteriorated to such an extent that they "would have been lost" if they had not been restored. The travertine slabs in the fountain's base also sustained substantial damage and staining over the years.

== Proposed relocation ==
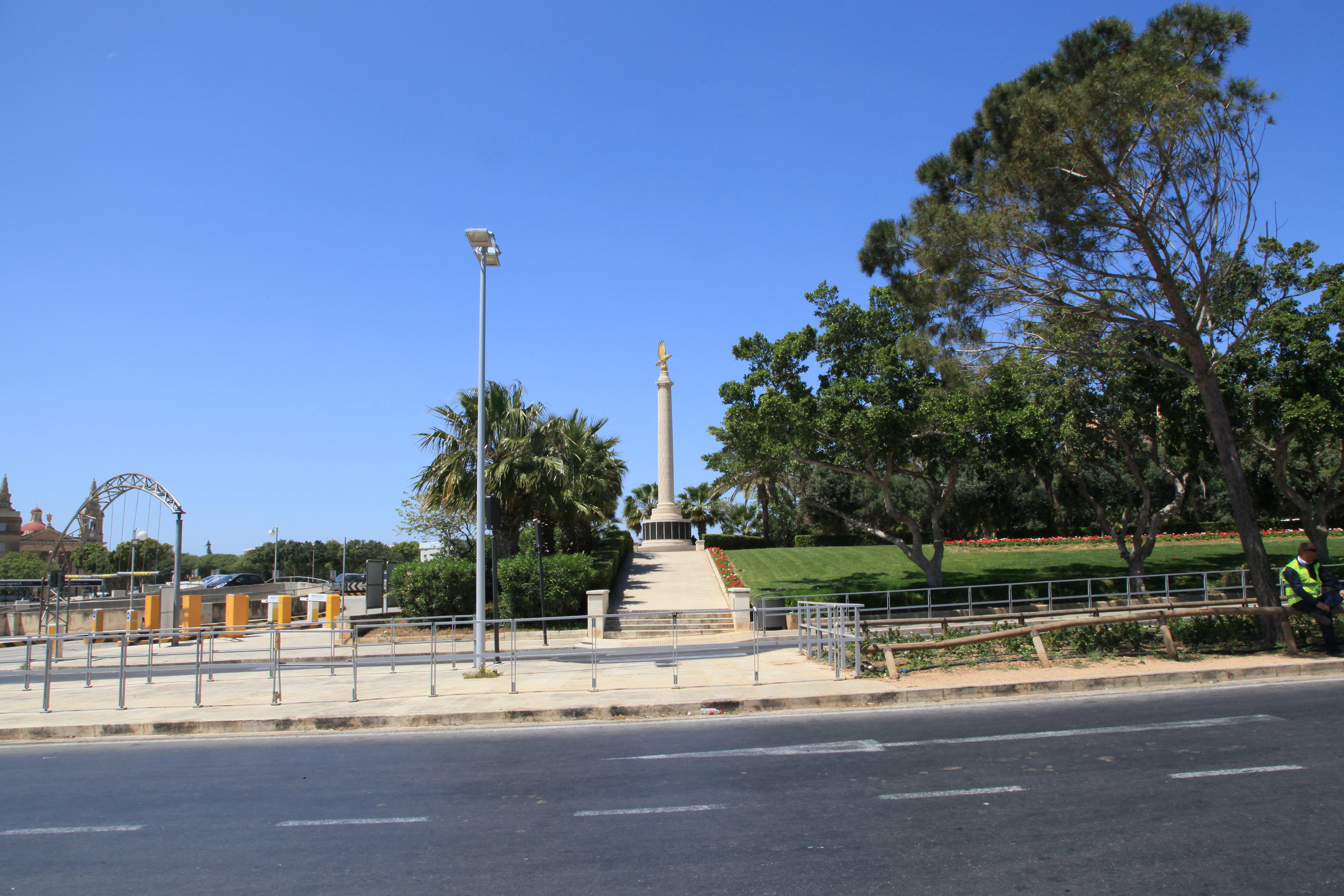
The garden near the Malta Memorial, where the Triton Fountain would have been relocated according to the 2011 proposal

In 2011, works began on a project by Renzo Piano to redesign the entrance of Valletta. This project included rebuilding the City Gate and landscaping the surrounding area, and Piano recommended that the Triton Fountain be shifted some distance away from its location immediately outside Valletta's entrance. The proposed relocation was announced by the Ministry for Infrastructure, Transport and Communications in April 2011, and it was meant to create an open space and restore "the architectural and historical context of the entrance to the fortified city". The approach to the City Gate would be flanked by trees and only accessible to pedestrians, while the fountain was to be restored and shifted to the garden opposite the Hotel Phoenicia, close to the Malta Memorial and the MCP car park. This would have moved the fountain from the limits of Valletta to Floriana.

The proposed relocation was controversial, and although some welcomed the proposal, most people were against moving the landmark fountain. Opponents stated that since the fountain has an underground system of passages, it is impossible to move it without destroying and rebuilding it, and the fountain might not work at all if moved. Concerns were also raised that the Triton figures would be damaged if they were to be moved. In December 2011, Minister Austin Gatt announced that the fountain will not be moved, and after restoration it will serve as the centerpiece of Piano's redesigned entrance to Valletta.

The fountain was scheduled as a Grade 1 property by the Malta Environment and Planning Authority on 8 May 2012, as one of the "20th Century Modernist Architecture and Monuments in Valletta and Floriana". On 28 December of the same year, it was included on the National Inventory of the Cultural Property of the Maltese Islands.

== Restoration ==
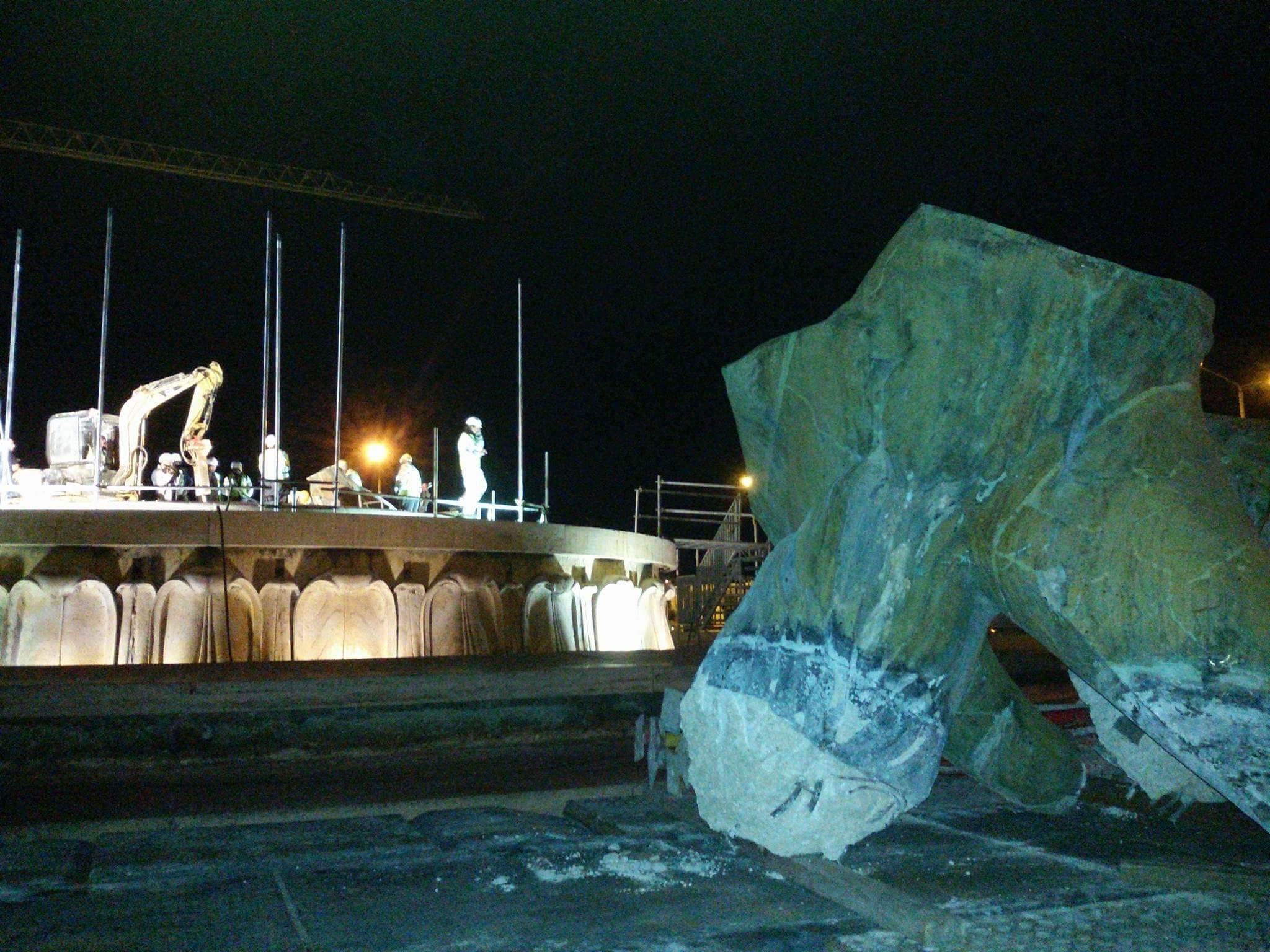
The Triton figures being dismantled prior to being sent for restoration in February 2017

Restoring the fountain to its lost original splendour (without the central sculpture) had rarely or better never been considered since the fountain was in such a dilapidated state that to most, (politicians included) it had very few limited merits. To make matters worse, established conservation ethics dictated black on white that an artefact's history is part and parcel of the artefact and should not be erased. Apart from Kenneth Cauchi who is a warranted and qualified bronze conservator and who was working behind the scenes, Robert Cassar the Curator of the Palace Armoury and a warranted and qualified bronze conservator was the only official to publicly express his professional views to stop the proposed the unwarranted fracas. The general perspective of most was that it was a flea ridden pit in a God forsaken place. Furthermore being dead centre in the middle of a disorganised bus terminus made it even more shabby. The aforementioned plans to relocate the fountain manifested this fact outrightly, however it was clear that the fountain super and sub-structure would never survive the move. Plans to restore the fountain were first made during the 2011 relocation proposal. After it was announced that the fountain will remain in its original location, it was mentioned that €2 million would be allocated to restore it, removing the alterations done in the 1980s. In January 2015, the Ministry for Transport and Infrastructure announced that restoration will begin that year and would be complete by 2017, at a cost of €500,000. However, nothing materialized initially and the Ministry only began the process to restore the fountain in October 2015. A month later, a pre-qualification questionnaire for prospective bidders interested in restoring the fountain was issued. The government made attempts to find a suitable bidder throughout 2016, until the Ministry signed a contract with Sea Fountain One on 12 January 2017 to restore the fountain to its original state by the end of the year. Restoration work, is to cost about €4 million since the damage was worse than expected.

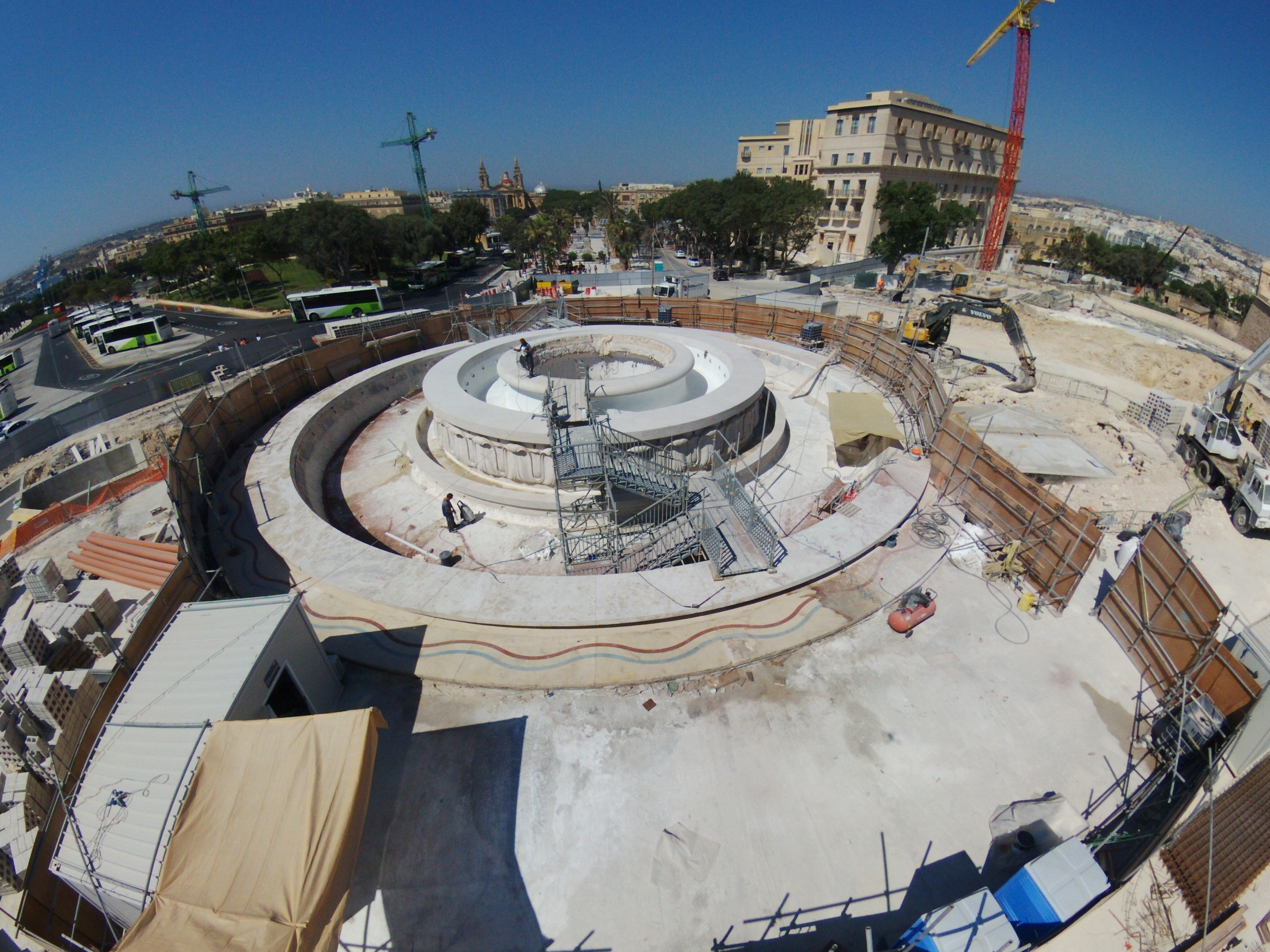
Restoration on the rest of the fountain on site, in June 2017

The Triton figures began to be dismantled on 4 February 2017, and they were later sent to Ferdinando Marinelli Artistic Foundry in Florence to be cleaned. The concrete that was used to fill the brass figures has been removed. A steel structure has been built inside the figures so as to support the weight of the plate, and each figure is now covered in microcrystalline wax for protection and was painted in azurite blue as was their original colour in 1959. The massive base of the fountain was restored by the De Feo Restauri of Rome, a specialized company in restoration of monuments. A new plant room has been constructed, which is connected to the new pump room through a tunnel. The restored Triton figures were sent back to Malta and reinstalled in August 2017, and renovation works of the surrounding square continued until the end of the year.

== Formal inauguration ==
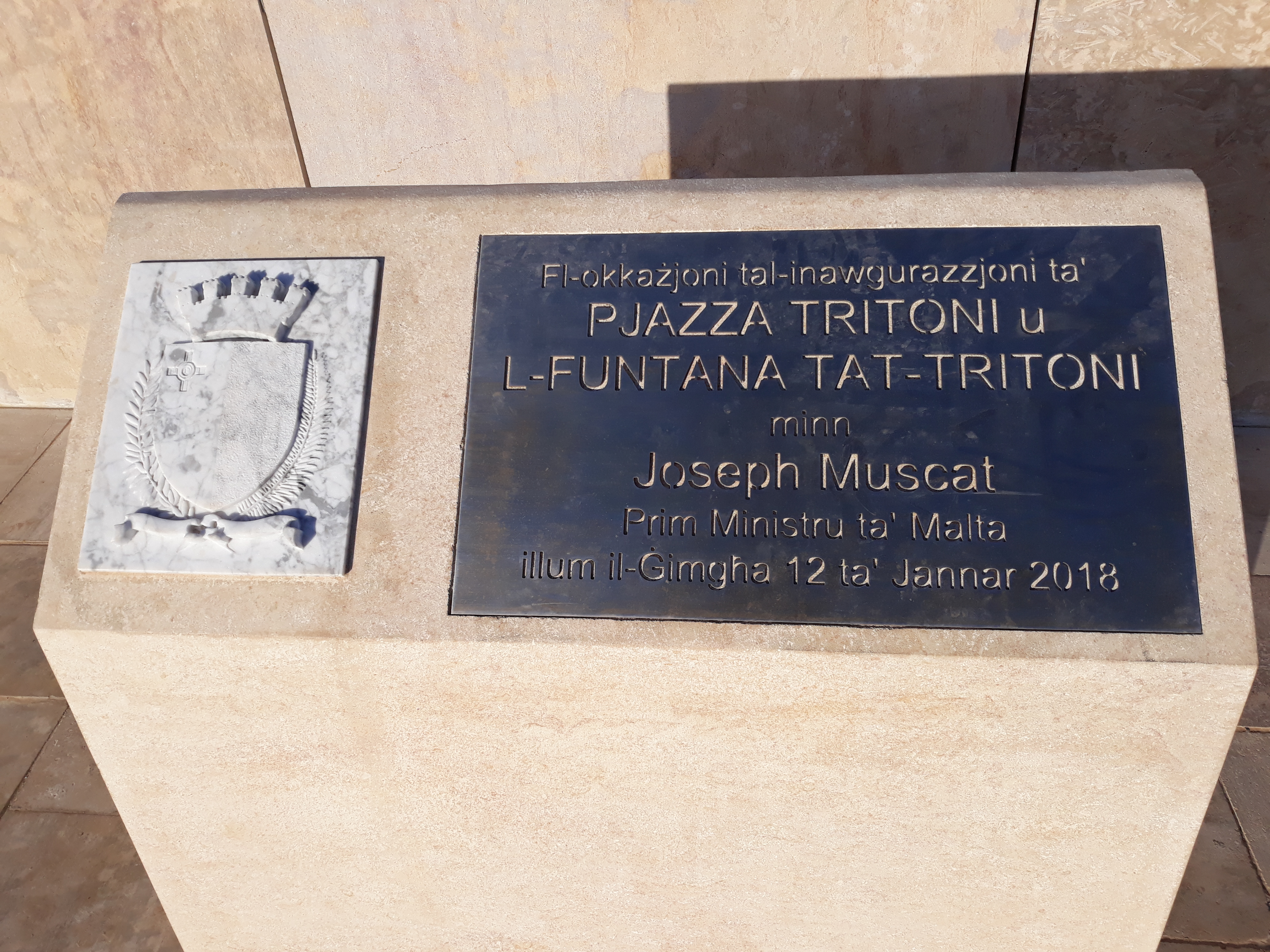
Plaque commemorating the fountain's inauguration in 2018

The restored fountain was finally (59 years late) officially inaugurated on 12 January 2018, by Prime Minister Joseph Muscat. The works were completed a week ahead of Valletta taking its position as European Capital of Culture 2018. It was stated that the restoration cost amounted to €4.5 million.

The maintenance of the fountain has always been the remit and jurisdiction of the Public Works Department (PWD) under the Director General Architect Stephen Bonello and through its specialized Manufacturing and Servicing Department (MSD) and its Director Ing. Ray Caruana. The fountain's upkeep has been the responsibility of all Permanent Secretaries succeeding Mr. Cutajar namely being Mr. Johan Galea and Mr. Joseph Caruana.

== Legacy ==
To commemorate the 5th anniversary from the Triton Fountain formal inauguration, Minister Stefan Zrinzo Azzopardi through his Permanent Secretary Carlos Tabone was instrumental to collaborate with MaltaPost to issue a number of commemorative stamps on Monday 11 December 2023. The event coincided with the appointment of Mr. Kenneth Cauchi as the first official Curator of the Triton Fountain.

By prior appointment with the Public Works Department through the Triton Fountain Curator, the 500-square metre plus underground complex of the fountain is open for a limited number of visitors, students, and specific groups (terms and conditions apply).

The Triton Fountain has been reinstated as a European landmark and a centre of cultural heritage. It is an electro-mechanical hydraulic plant.
