= Victor Anastasi =

Maltese architectural designer (1913–1992)

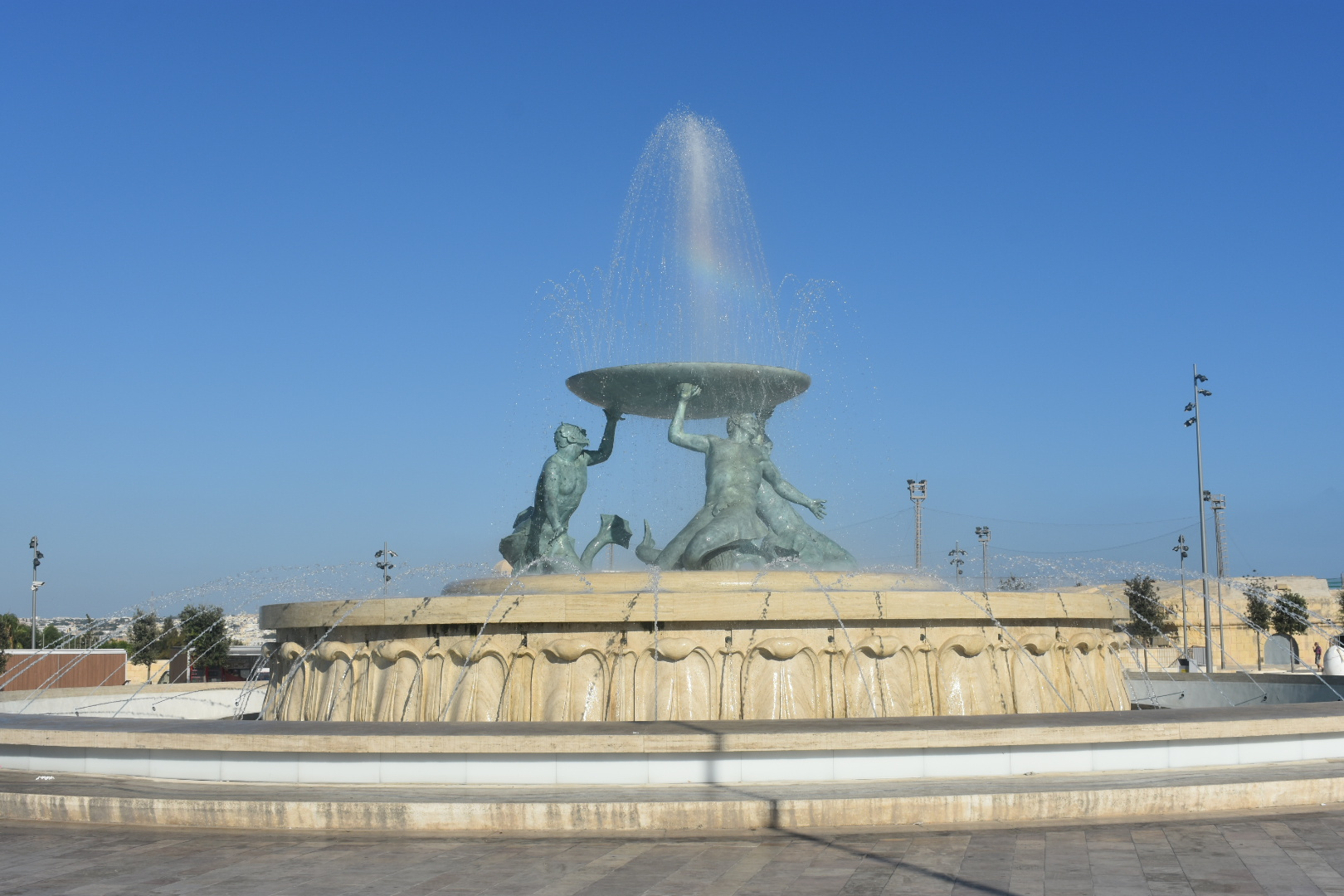
The Triton Fountain in Valletta, which was designed by Anastasi together with the sculptor Vincent Apap

Victor Anastasi (1913 – 15 November 1992) was a Maltese designer. He worked as a draughtsman with the Public Works Department, and although he never formally studied architecture, he was involved in the design process of numerous buildings. He was an admirer of Italian architecture, and often traveled to Rome where he often met with Maltese artists who were studying there.

He was born in Valletta in the Crown Colony of Malta. His most famous work is the Triton Fountain in Valletta, which he designed along with the sculptor Vincent Apap in the 1950s. Anastasi designed the architectural and technical elements of the fountain, while Apap worked on the sculpture of the three bronze Tritons. Anastasi was not mentioned on the fountain's proposal since PWD employees were ineligible in the competition.

He also designed the Malta College of Arts, Science and Technology (now the Ġ. F. Abela Junior College) in Msida, which was designed and built between 1962 and 1966.
