= William Apap =

Maltese artist

William 'Willie' Apap
- Born: 26 June 1918; Valletta, Malta
- Died: 3 February 1970 (aged 51); Rome, Italy
- Education: Malta Government School of Art, Accademia di Belle Arti
- Known for: Painting
- Notable work: The Deposition, St.Paul and the Viper, Portrait of H.R.H. Princess Anne

William Apap (26 June 1918 – 3 February 1970) was a Maltese artist. He was born in Valletta, Malta, on 26 June 1918. He was the youngest member of a family that included the sculptor Vincent Apap and musician Joseph Apap.

His first work dates back to 1933 in a book published about Maltese folklore by Professor Arnaldo Fabriani. In the same year he joined the School of Art in Valletta where he received his training in Art under the guidance of his brother Vincent, who was then an art teacher, and by the two brothers, Robert and Edward Caruana Dingli. Apap managed to get a painter's scholarship from the School of Art in 1937 at the Accademia di Belle Arti in Rome, where he eventually spent most of his life.

Apap avoided joining the military during WWII by going into hiding. For this reason he was accused of treason.

His first exhibition was held at the Cassapanca Gallery in Rome in July 1945 where he had 75, mostly landscape paintings. He held another exhibition in 1958. In January 1962 he held a paintings exhibition together with his brother Vincent at the Grabowski Gallery, London. In 1964, Willie Apap took part in an exhibition of Sacred Art at the L'Agostiniana Gallery, Rome. His works then appeared in a collective exhibition, in July 1972, of Sacred Art at St. John's Co-Cathedral, Valletta. Apap, has held one-man exhibitions in both Italy and the U.K.

William Apap's paintings include Maltese, English and Italian landscapes, still-life, nude-studies and portraits, having his portraits of H.R.H. Princess Anne, Lord Mountbatten of Burma, King Vittorio Emanuele III of Italy, and the S.M.O.M. Grand Master Fra Angelo de Mojana among his most prestigious portraits. He also has some sacred art paintings, where "St. Paul Throwing the Viper in Fire" is his best example of this genre.

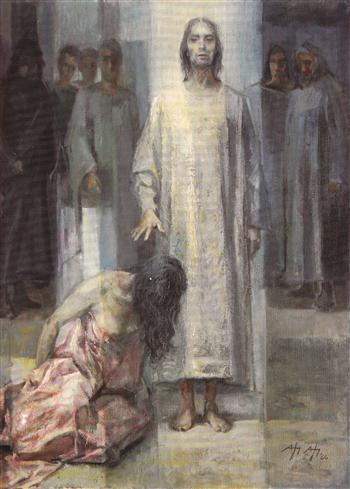
La Benedizione by Willie Apap (1966), on display at MUŻA in Valletta

Apap died in Rome on 3 February 1970 after a long illness.
