= Russell Foskett =

Australian Second World War flying ace

Russell George Foskett
- Born: 7 May 1917; Roseville, New South Wales
- Died: 31 October 1944 (aged 27); Aegean Sea
- Burial place: At sea
- Military career
- Allegiance: Australia
- Branch: Royal Australian Air Force
- Service years: 1940–1944
- Rank: Squadron Leader
- Commands: No. 94 Squadron (1943–44)
- Conflicts: Second World War; Middle East Theatre; Second Battle of El Alamein
- Awards: Officer of the Order of the British Empire; Distinguished Flying Cross; Mentioned in Despatches

Russell George Foskett, OBE, DFC (7 May 1917 – 31 October 1944) was an Australian aviator and flying ace of the Second World War. Born in a suburb of Sydney, Foskett was employed as a clerk in 1940 when he enlisted in the Royal Australian Air Force. Accepted as a pilot under the Empire Air Training Scheme, he completed his training in Australia and Southern Rhodesia, before transferring for service over North Africa. In subsequent aerial engagements, Foskett was officially credited with the destruction of 6 1/2 Axis aircraft and awarded the Distinguished Flying Cross. Appointed to command No. 94 Squadron RAF, he was transferred to the Mediterranean Theatre in 1944. Foskett was killed on 31 October 1944, after his aircraft developed engine trouble and he was forced to bail out over the Aegean Sea, where his parachute failed to open.

== Early life ==
Foskett was born in the Sydney suburb of Roseville, New South Wales, on 7 May 1917 to Edward George Foskett, an accountant, and his wife Dora Mabel (née Cotterill). Foskett was educated at Hornsby Junior Technical School, before going on to study accountancy. He later gained employment as a clerk in the credit department of Shell Co. of Australia Pty Ltd. In his youth, Foskett was active in scouting as a Rover as well as sport, particularly hockey; he was a member of the Gordon district hockey club and represented New South Wales.

== Second World War ==
=== Training ===
On 18 September 1940, Foskett enlisted in the Royal Australian Air Force for service during the Second World War. Accepted for flight training under the Empire Air Training Scheme, he received his initial flight instruction at No. 2 Initial Training School, Bradfield Park. Completing this course on 9 November, Foskett was advanced to leading aircraftman and posted to No. 2 Embarkation Depot. On 10 December, he embarked from Sydney bound for Africa.

Foskett disembarked at Southern Rhodesia in January 1941, following a three-week voyage. Allocated to the Initial Training Wing, he completed a two-week stint with the unit before proceeding to No. 25 Empire Flight Training School. On graduating from the school, Foskett was posted to No. 20 Service Flying School for advanced flight instruction on 5 March; he was promoted to acting sergeant the following day. On 23 April, Foskett was awarded his flying badge, becoming a fully qualified pilot.

=== North Africa ===
Promoted to the substantive rank of sergeant on 10 June 1941, Foskett was transferred to the RAF Headquarters, Middle East the following day. He spent two weeks with the headquarters, prior to moving on to No. 71 Operation Training Unit. In July, Foskett was posted to No. 80 Squadron RAF, flying Hawker Hurricanes over North Africa. Commissioned as a pilot officer on 15 March 1942, Foskett was further promoted to acting flight lieutenant in July and appointed a flight commander of the squadron the following month. The commanding officer of No. 80 Squadron, Donald Jack, later commented of Foskett during this time: "the man, who was a born leader ... had everything required; enthusiasm, aggression, humour, a zest for life and boundless energy".

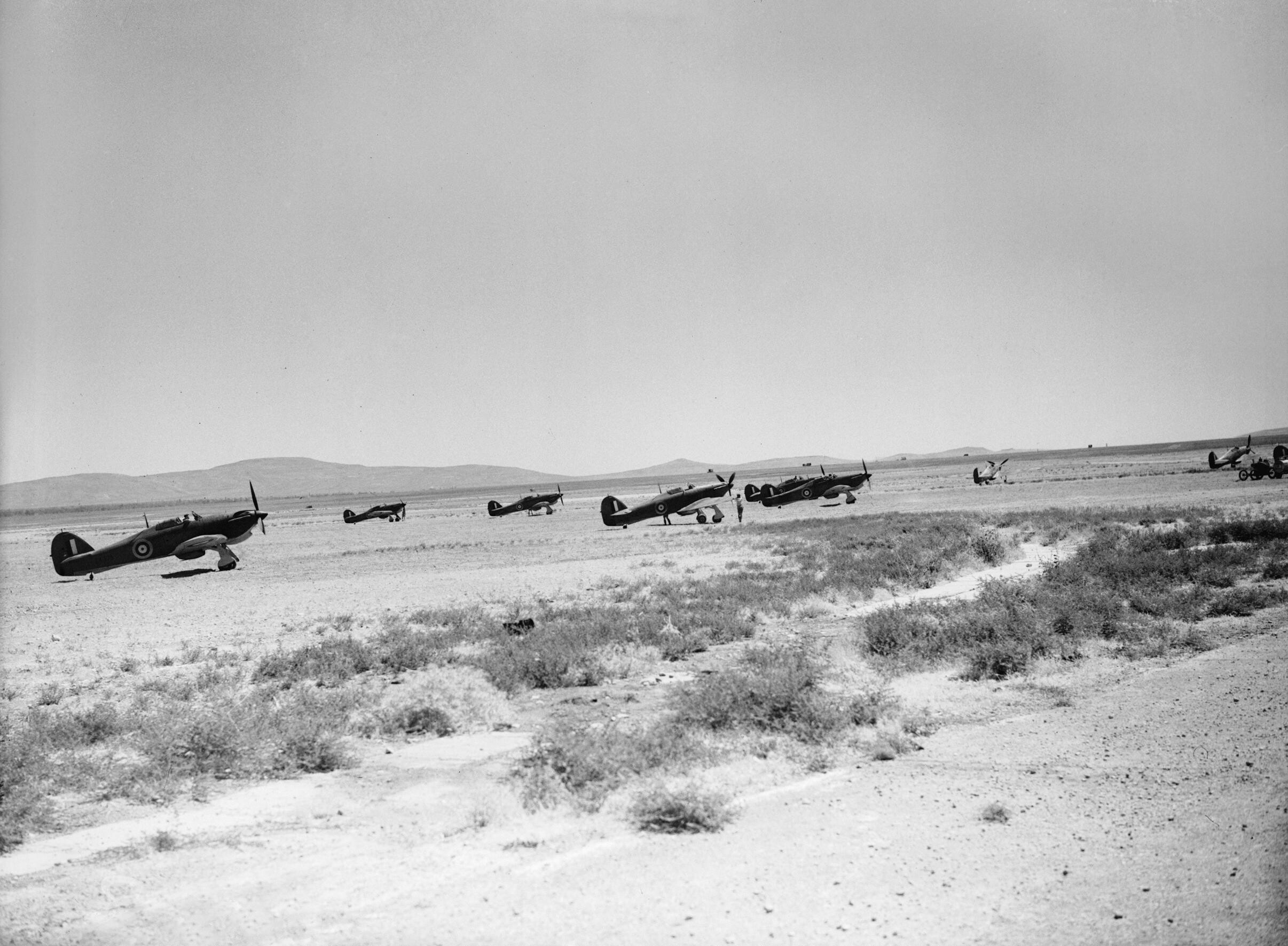
Hawker Hurricanes from No. 80 Squadron RAF at an airfield in North Africa. c.1941

On 3 November 1942, Foskett led his squadron in a sortie over El Alamein against a formation of Stuka dive bombers that were escorted by Messerschmitt Bf 109s. During the ensuing engagement, seven Stukas were shot down, with an additional eight probably destroyed and several others damaged. Foskett himself shot down two of the Axis aircraft before he was hit by fire from one of the Messerschmitts. Forced down, Foskett landed his aircraft in a minefield, where he was safely extracted by a formation of the British Army in the area. Returning to his squadron that evening, Foskett resumed flying duties the following morning. Foskett was subsequently awarded the Distinguished Flying Cross for his actions during the engagement. The announcement and accompanying citation for the award was published in a supplement to the London Gazette on 4 December 1942, reading:

Air Ministry, 4th December, 1942.

ROYAL AIR FORCE.

The KING has been graciously pleased to approve the following awards in recognition of gallantry displayed in flying operations against the enemy: —

Distinguished Flying Cross.

Acting Flight Lieutenant Russell George FOSKETT (Aus.402652), Royal Australian Air Force, No. 80 Squadron.

One day in November, 1942, this officer led his squadron in an attack on a formation of Stuka dive bombers, heavily escorted by fighters. During the combat 7 Stukas were shot down, a further 8 probably destroyed and several others were damaged. Flight Lieutenant Foskett, who displayed great skill and daring, destroyed 2 of the enemy aircraft before his own was hit. He landed safely, however, and re-joined his squadron the same night. The following morning he resumed his flying duties. This officer has participated in a large number of sorties and has displayed inspiring leadership.

=== No. 94 Squadron ===
Foskett continued to undertake sorties with No. 80 Squadron until late March 1943, when his operational tour came to an end. Promoted to acting squadron leader, he was posted as a staff officer to the headquarters of No. 209 Group, located in Haifa, Palestine, on 25 May. Foskett's service with the headquarters lasted until 6 October, when he was appointed as commander of No. 94 Squadron RAF. Based in the Libyan town of El Adem, the squadron was equipped with Hawker Hurricanes and consisted of a mixture of Commonwealth personnel, in addition to a contingent of Yugoslavian pilots.

Foskett administered and led No. 94 Squadron as it operated over North Africa and the Middle East throughout 1944. Noted as "outstanding" as "a fighter pilot and commander" during this time, Foskett was consequently Mentioned in Despatches and awarded the wings of the Royal Yugoslav Air Force by King Peter II. The squadron was re-equipped with Supermarine Spitfires during February that year, and it was while piloting one of these aircraft that Foskett scored his final victory of the war. On 6 June, Foskett was involved in a sweeping sortie over Crete when he became engaged with a Junkers Ju 52. In the ensuing battle, Foskett managed to shoot down the opposing aircraft over Tmimi, Libya. During October 1944, No. 94 Squadron was relocated to Kalamaki, Greece.

On 31 October 1944, Foskett was returning to base following an operation when his Spitfire developed engine trouble between the islands of Skiathos and Skópelos over the Aegean Sea. He attempted to bail out of the aircraft, but his altitude was too low for his parachute to open, and he was consequently killed. Foskett's body was later recovered, and he was buried at sea; he is commemorated on the Malta Memorial. Foskett's younger brother Bruce William, a Royal Australian Air Force navigator, had been killed in an operation over Berlin the previous February. By the time of his death, Foskett had been officially credited with a tally of 6 1/2 Axis aircraft shot down. For his command of No. 94 Squadron, Foskett was appointed an Officer of the Order of the British Empire, which was posthumously announced in a supplement to the London Gazette on 1 January 1945. On 16 February 1946, Foskett's father, Edward, attended an investiture ceremony at Government House, Sydney, where he was presented with his late son's decorations by the Governor-General of Australia, Prince Henry, Duke of Gloucester.
