= Malta Memorial =

War memorial monument in Malta

- Commonwealth War Graves Commission
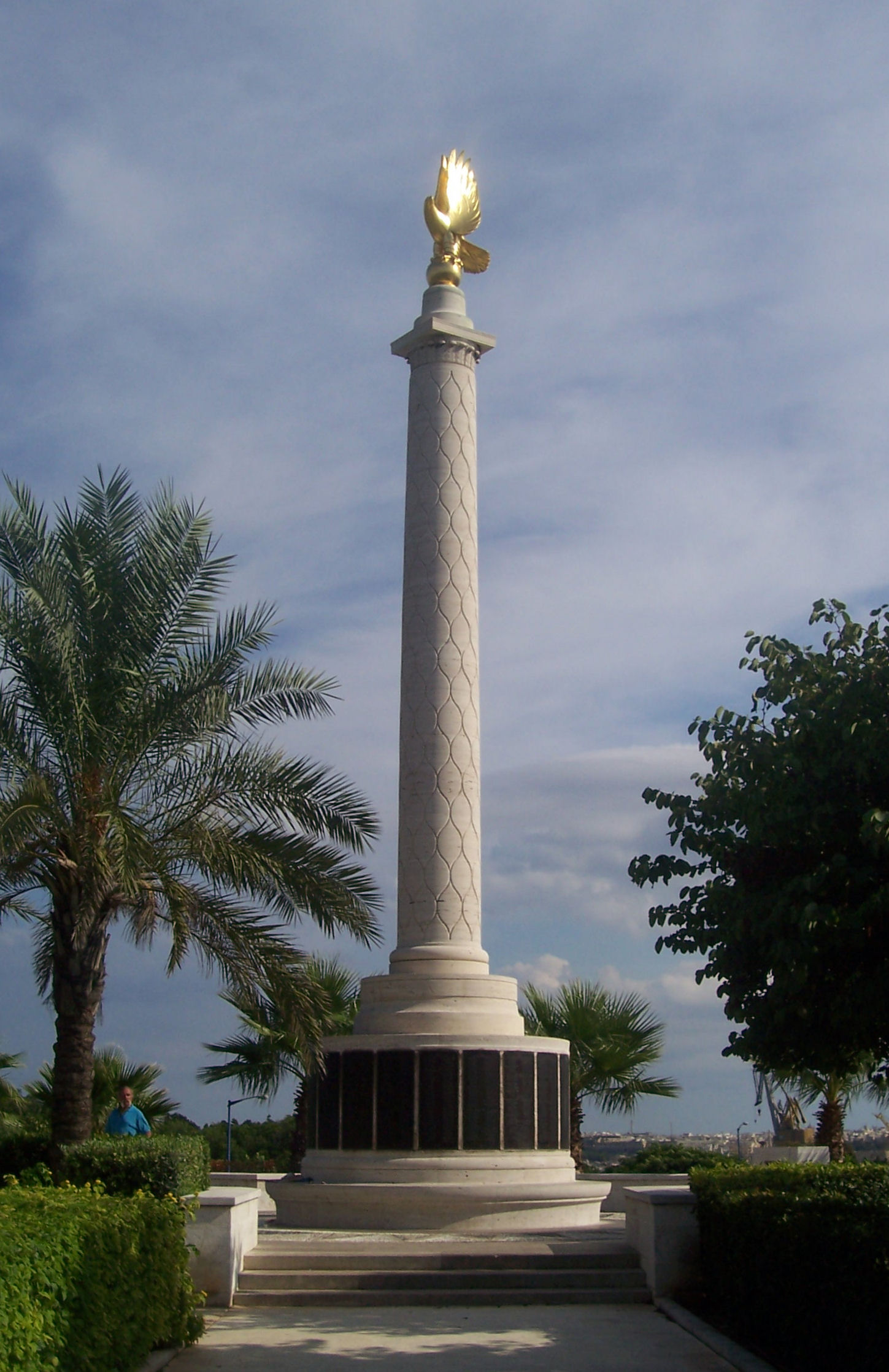
- Dedicated to Second World War Commonwealth aircrew
- Used for those deceased
- Unveiled: 3 May 1954
- Location: 35°53′40.57″N 014°30′28.27″E near Floriana
- Commemorated: 2,298
- OVER THESE AND NEIGHBOURING LANDS AND SEAS THE AIRMEN WHOSE NAMES ARE RECORDED HERE FELL IN RAID OR SORTIE AND HAVE NO KNOWN GRAVE MALTA GIBRALTAR MEDITERRANEAN ADRIATIC TUNISIA SICILY ITALY YUGOSLAVIA AUSTRIA PROPOSITI INSULA TENAX TENACES VIROS COMMEMORAT

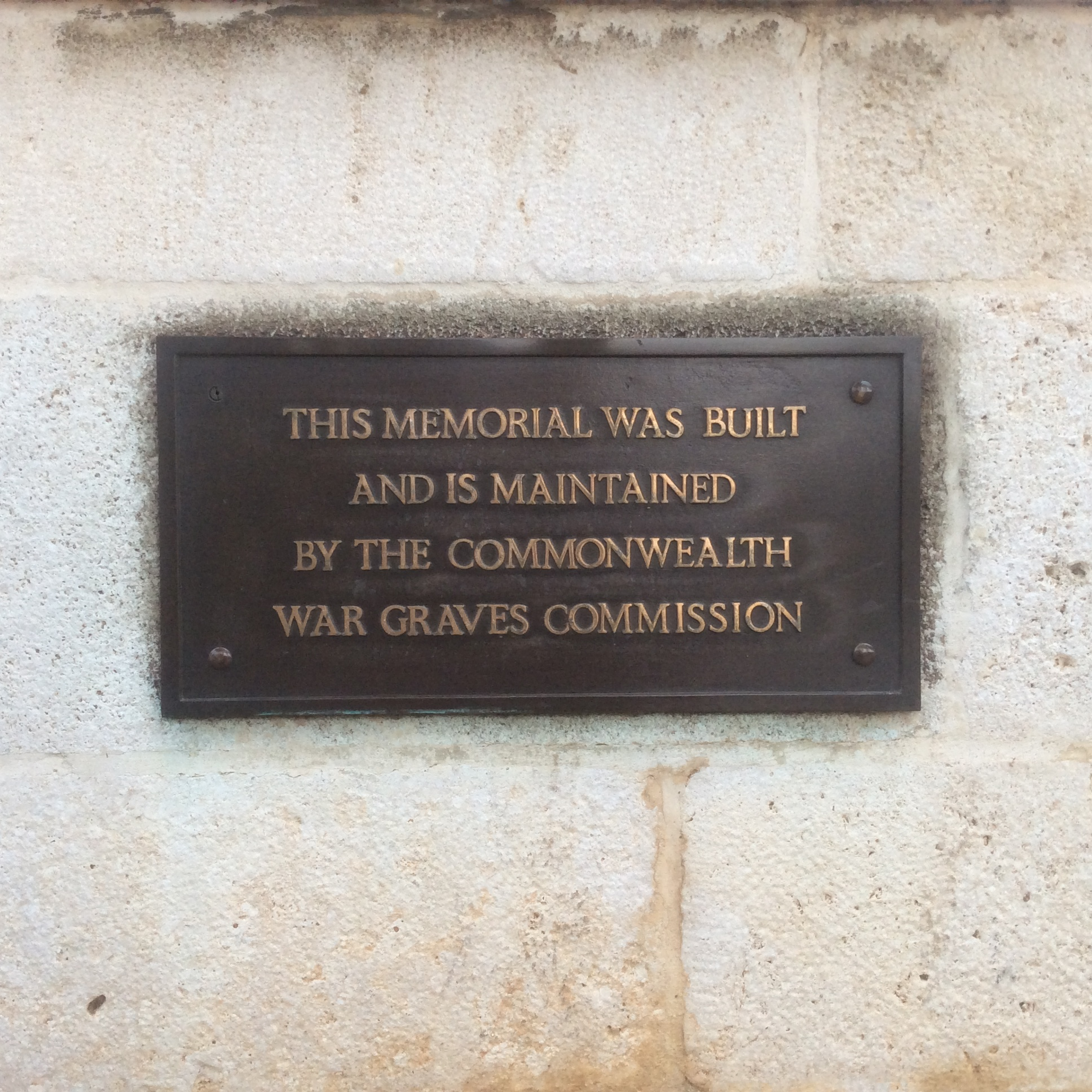
Plaque informing the public at the start of the walkway

The Malta Memorial is a war memorial monument to the 2,298 Commonwealth aircrew who lost their lives in the various Second World War air battles and engagements around the Mediterranean, whilst serving with the Commonwealth Air Forces flying from bases in Austria, Italy, Sicily, islands of the Adriatic and Mediterranean, Malta, Tunisia, Algeria, Morocco, West Africa, Yugoslavia and Gibraltar, and who have no known grave.

Because of its pivotal contribution to the air war in the Mediterranean, Malta was chosen for the location of the memorial. Built on land donated by the Government of Malta, it is located in the area of Floriana, to the south side of the Triton Fountain close to City Gate, the entrance to Malta's capital city, Valletta. It was inaugurated by Queen Elizabeth II on 3 May 1954.

The Malta Memorial is identified by the gilded bronze golden eagle which surmounts the 15 m (49 ft) column of Travertine marble, from Tivoli in the Sabine Hills near Rome. It is carved with a light netted pattern and surmounted by a gilded bronze eagle 2.4 m (7 ft 10 in) high. The monument was designed by Sir Hubert Worthington, while the eagle which surmounts the column is the work of the sculptor Charles Wheeler. The eagle was gilded by local artist and Maltese gilder John Pace in 2016.

The column stands on a circular base around which the names are inscribed on bronze panels. The circular marble base itself is inscribed with the motto of the Royal Air Force and most Commonwealth air forces, "Per Ardua Ad Astra".

At the base of the column itself, a bronze panel bears the following inscription:

OVER THESE AND NEIGHBOURING LANDS AND SEAS THE AIRMEN WHOSE NAMES ARE RECORDED HERE FELL IN RAID OR SORTIE AND HAVE NO KNOWN GRAVE MALTA GIBRALTAR MEDITERRANEAN ADRIATIC TUNISIA SICILY ITALY YUGOSLAVIA AUSTRIA PROPOSITI INSULA TENAX TENACES VIROS COMMEMORAT*

The Latin epigram may be rendered in English: AN ISLAND RESOLUTE OF PURPOSE REMEMBERS RESOLUTE MEN.

Those remembered on the memorial include:

- Lloyd Allan Trigg VC DFC (5 May 1914–11 August 1943), of Houhora, New Zealand, a pilot in the RNZAF. He was a posthumous recipient of the Victoria Cross, the highest award for gallantry in the face of the enemy for British and Commonwealth armed forces. His award is unique, as it was awarded on evidence solely provided by the enemy, for an action in which there were no surviving Allied witnesses to corroborate his gallantry.
- Russell Foskett, Australian flying ace
- Nigel Park, New Zealand flying ace credited with destroying 10 enemy aircraft during the Siege of Malta
- 285 men from the Royal Canadian Air Force
- Approximately 195 southern Africans who served in either the South African Air Force, Royal Air Force or other Commonwealth air forces

== See also ==
- War Memorial (Floriana)
