= War Memorial (Floriana) =

- Monument tal-Gwerra
- Malta
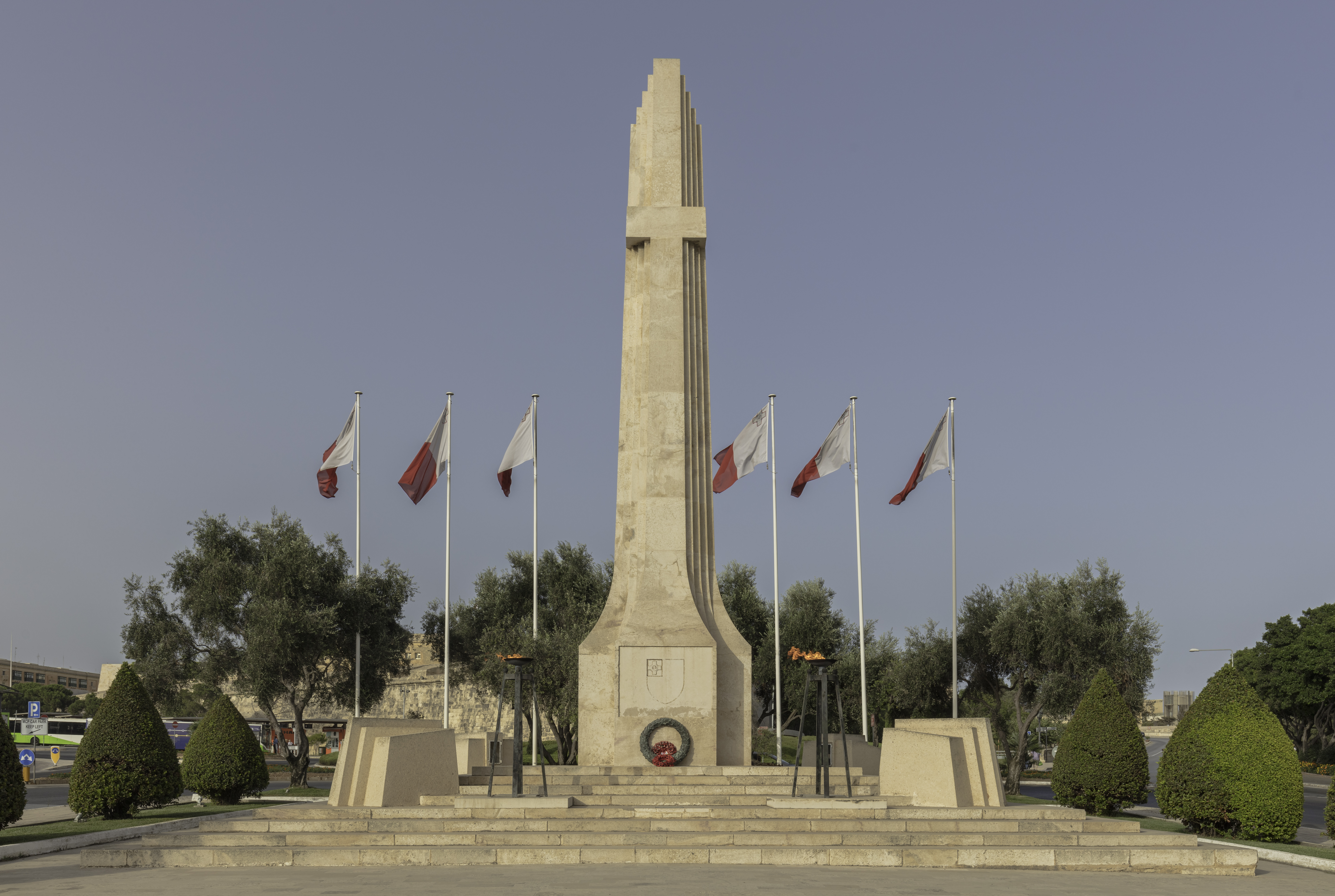
- View of the War Memorial
- For the dead of World War I and World War II
- Unveiled: 11 November 1938
- Location: 35°53′37.15″N 14°30′29.21″E; Floriana, Malta
- Designed by: Louis Naudi (Futurism)

The War Memorial (Maltese: Monument tal-Gwerra) is a memorial obelisk in Floriana, Malta, which commemorates the dead of World War I and World War II. It was inaugurated on 11 November 1938 by Governor Charles Bonham-Carter to the memory of those killed in World War I, but in 1949 it was rededicated to those killed in both world wars.

The monument was designed by Maltese artist Louis Naudi, who was influenced by Antonio Sciortino.

According to Mark G. Muscat, the War Memorial "is possibly the sole example of a work of art in Malta which up to a certain extent illustrates the idea of Futurism put forward by Marinetti and Sant'Elia in Italy... Naudi deserves credit for his successful attempt at breaking away from the British colonial architecture that was commonplace at the time... It would be more plausible to classify the War Memorial as an Art Deco stylistic expression... as an avant-garde aesthetic applied to hardstone construction, which gives Naudi's towering design an imposing look."

The monument is an obelisk in the form of a Latin cross, and it is built out of local globigerina limestone. It has four plaques showing the colonial badge of Malta and reproductions of a document issued by King George V in 1918 acknowledging Malta's role in World War I, the letter by which King George VI awarded the George Cross to Malta in 1942, and a 1943 scroll by President Franklin D. Roosevelt saluting Malta for its role in World War II.

The War Memorial is located on a site which was used for public executions when Malta was under Hospitaller rule. It is close to the Malta Memorial which is dedicated to Commonwealth aircrew who died in World War II, and memorials to the Royal Malta Artillery and The King's Own Malta Regiment. It was originally positioned halfway between City Gate and Ġlormu Cassar Avenue, but was relocated during the realignment of St. Anne Street in 1954. The memorial was restored and the area around it landscaped in the early 2010s. An eternal flame was installed at this point.

The President and Prime Minister as well as other dignitaries lay wreaths at the monument at an annual remembrance ceremony. The memorial is scheduled as a Grade 1 national monument.

== Gallery ==
Details on the memorial

The monument was gilded by the local artist and Maltese gilder John Pace in 1995 as part of a restoration project carried out by the Valletta Rehabilitation Project.

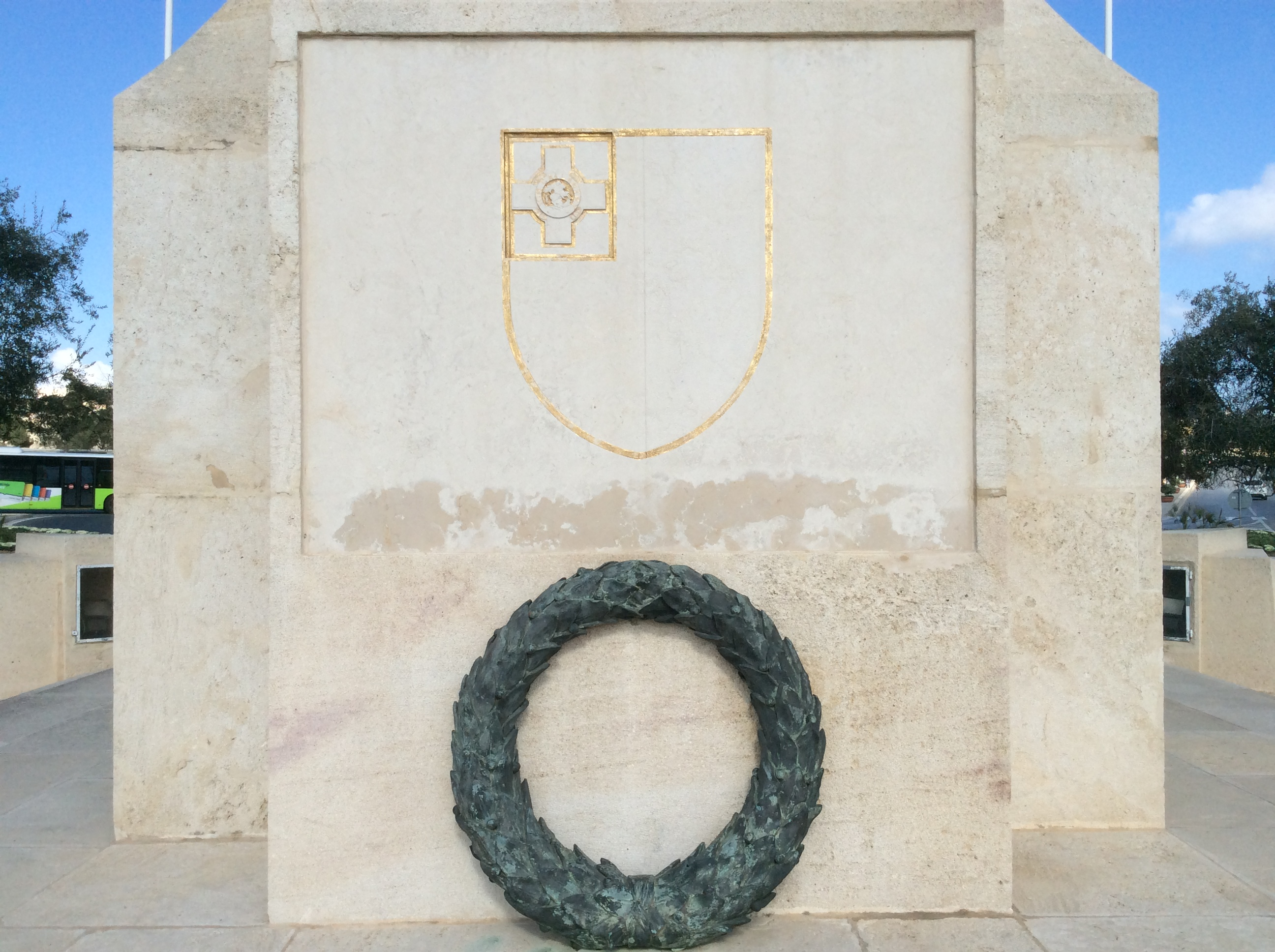
Front side

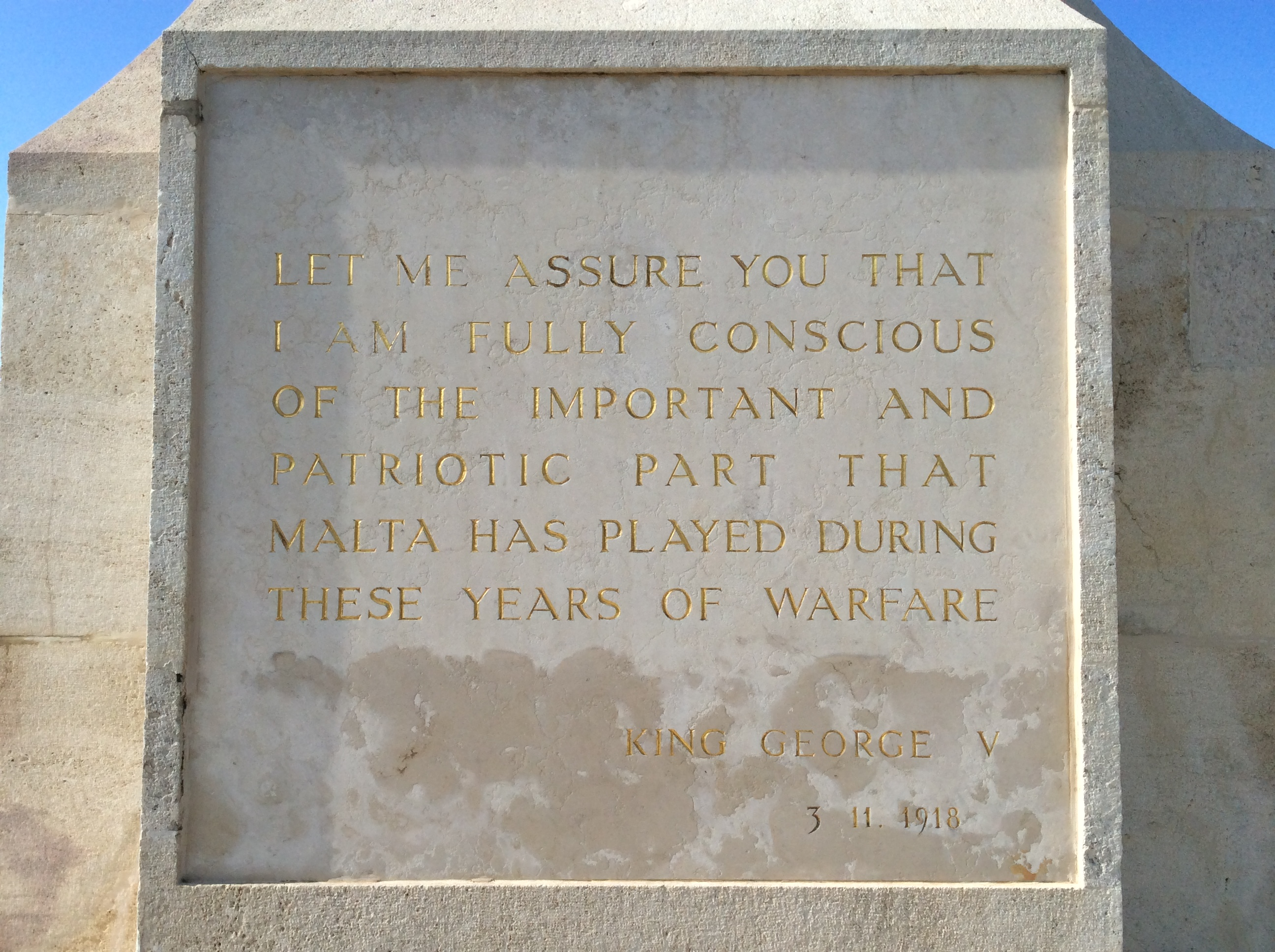
Right side

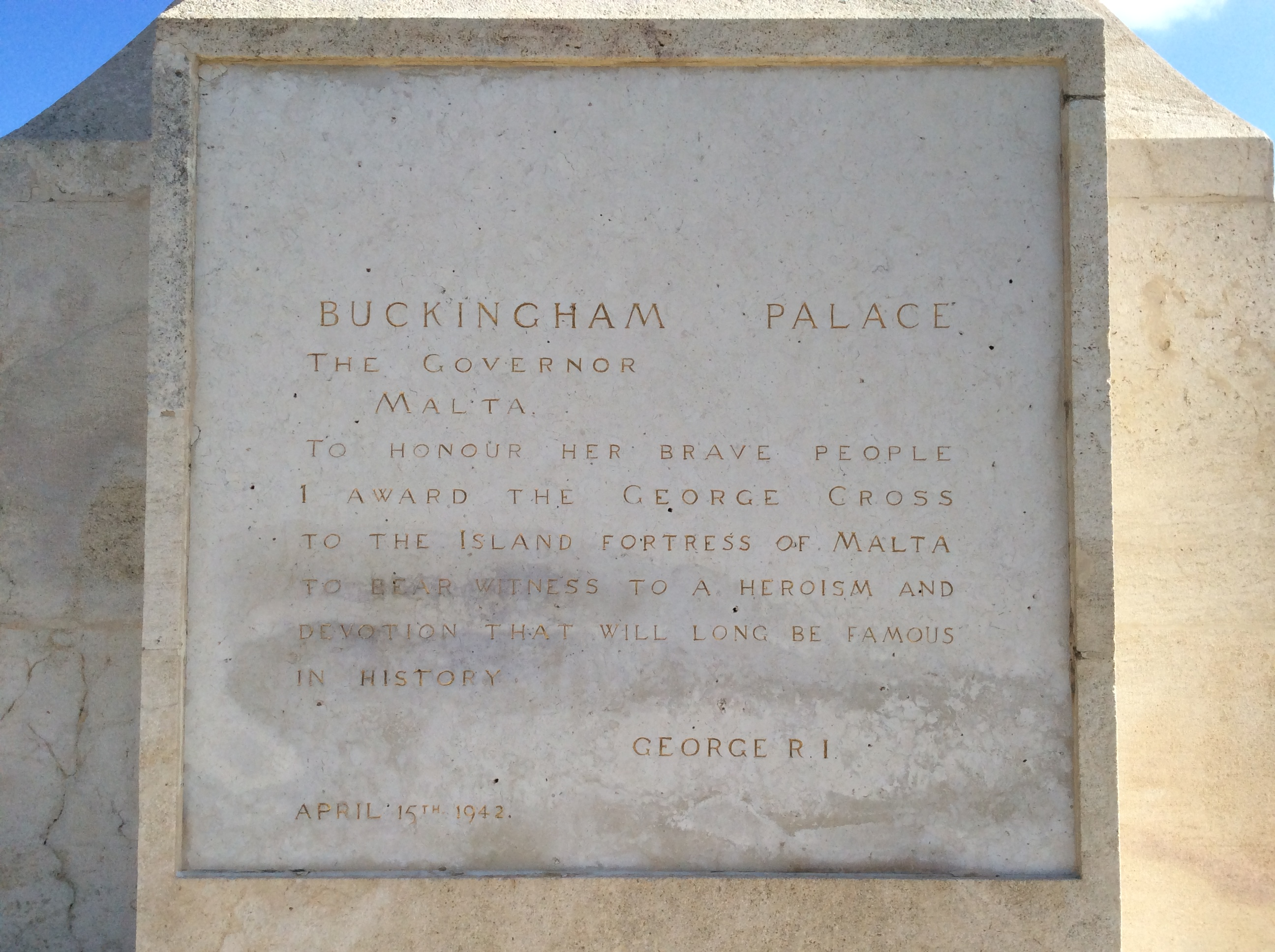
Left side

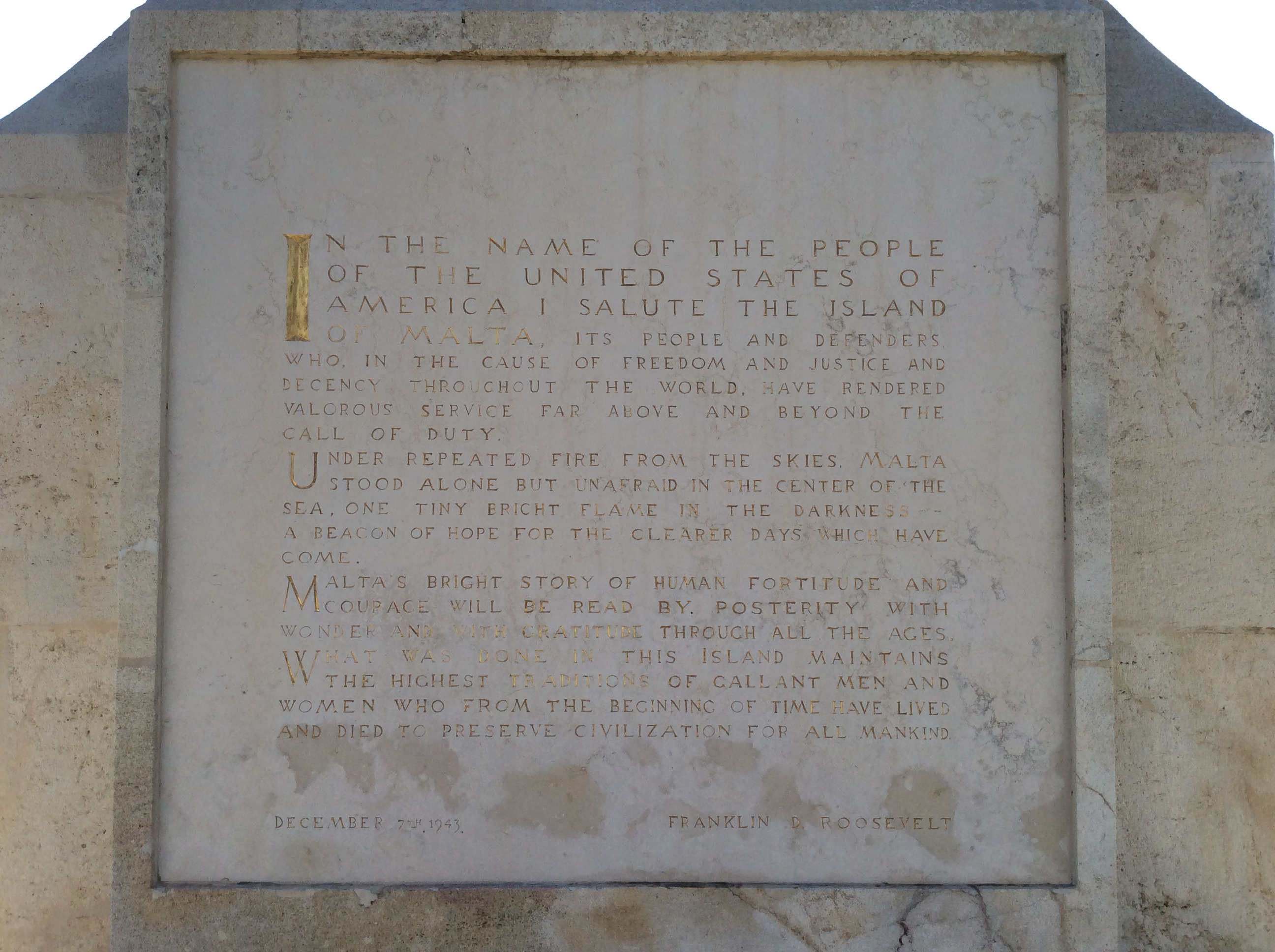
Back side
The memorial from different angles
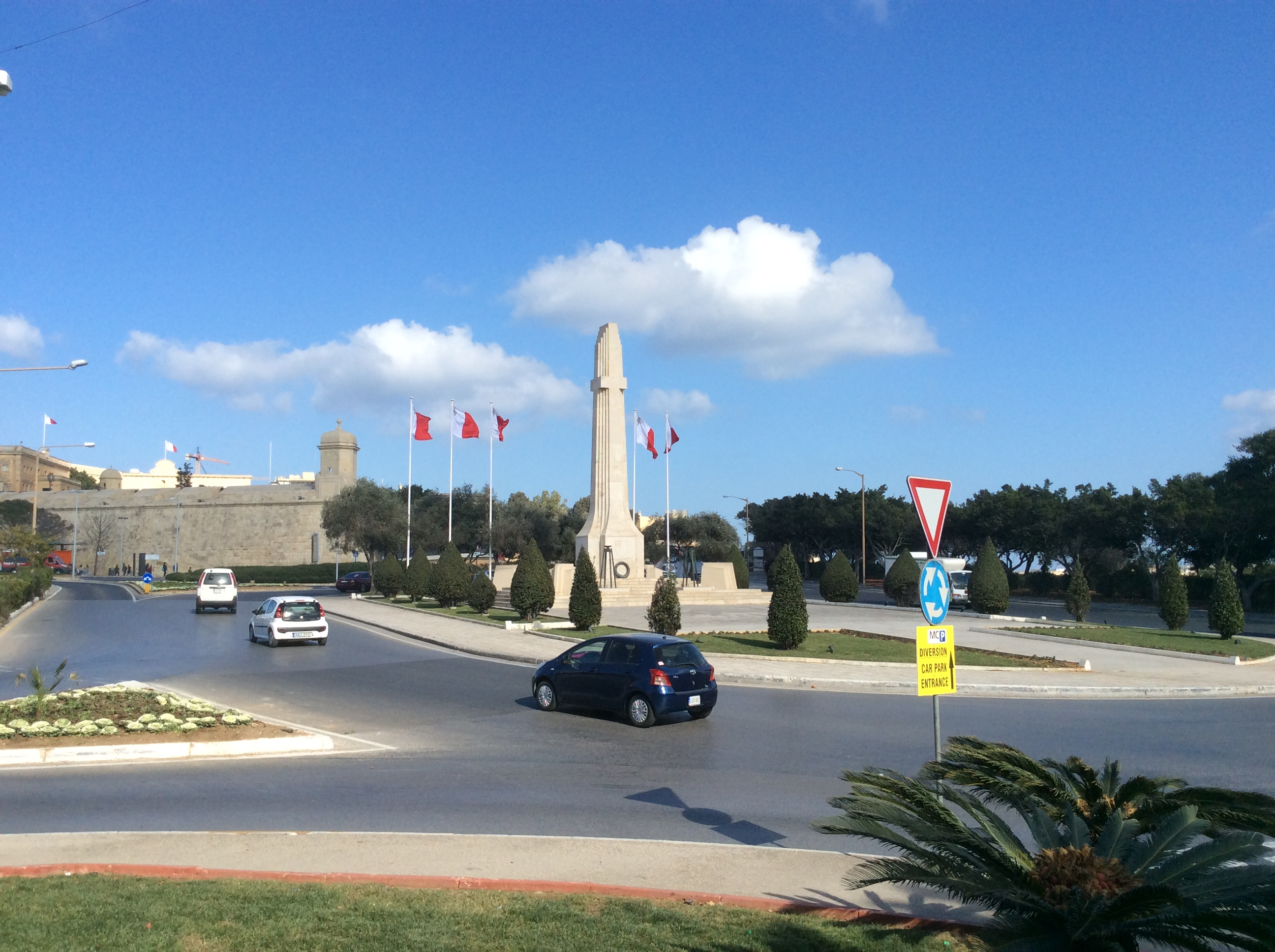
The imposing memorial is on a prominent roundabout

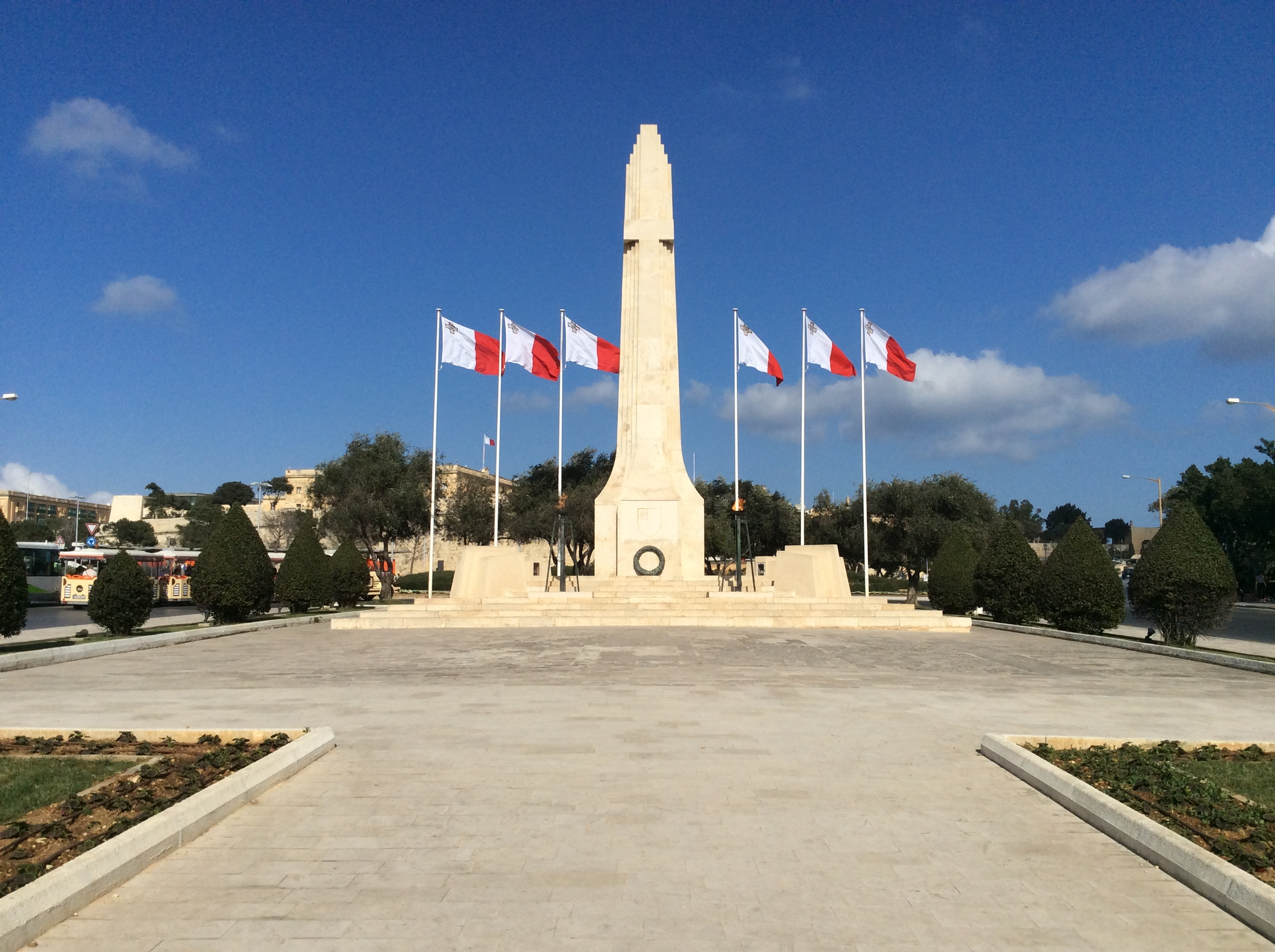
Landscape around the memorial

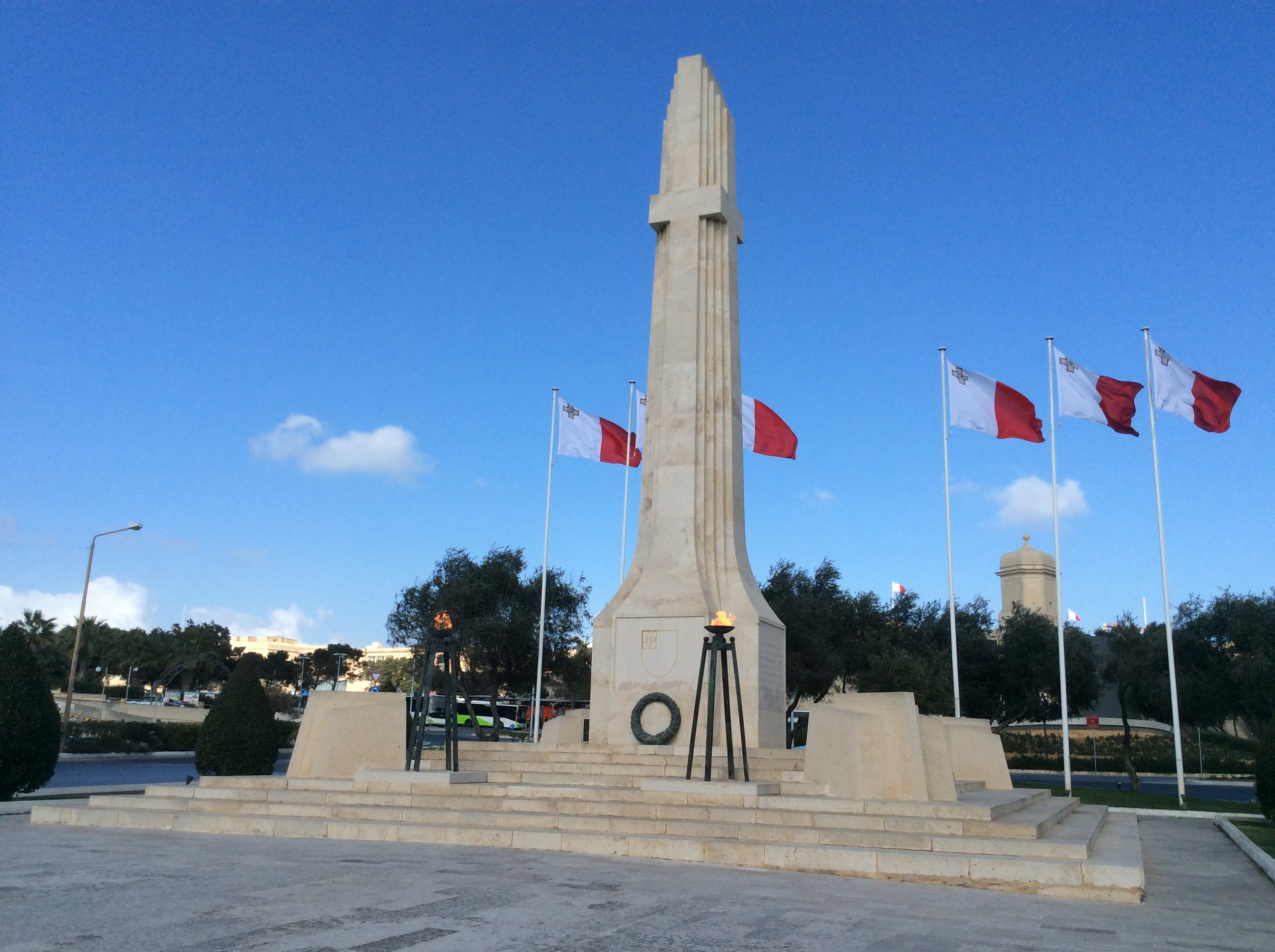
Memorial with eternal flames

== See also ==
- Malta Memorial
