= Vincent Apap =

Maltese sculptor

Vincent Apap, OBE
- Ċensu Apap
- Born: 13 November 1909; Valletta, Malta
- Died: 15 February 2003 (aged 93); Malta
- Occupation: Sculptor
- Notable work: Triton Fountain, and various monuments and statues
- Style: Modernism
- Spouse: Maria Bencini (m. 1941)
- Children: John Apap; Nella Apap; Manon Apap
- Family: Joseph Apap (brother); William Apap (brother); Mary Micallef nee Apap (sister)

Vincent Apap, OBE (Maltese: Ċensu Apap; 13 November 1909 – 15 February 2003) was a Maltese sculptor who is well known for designing various public monuments and church statues, most notably the Triton Fountain in Valletta. He has been called "one of Malta's foremost sculptors of the Modern Period" by the studio of Renzo Piano.

== Biography ==
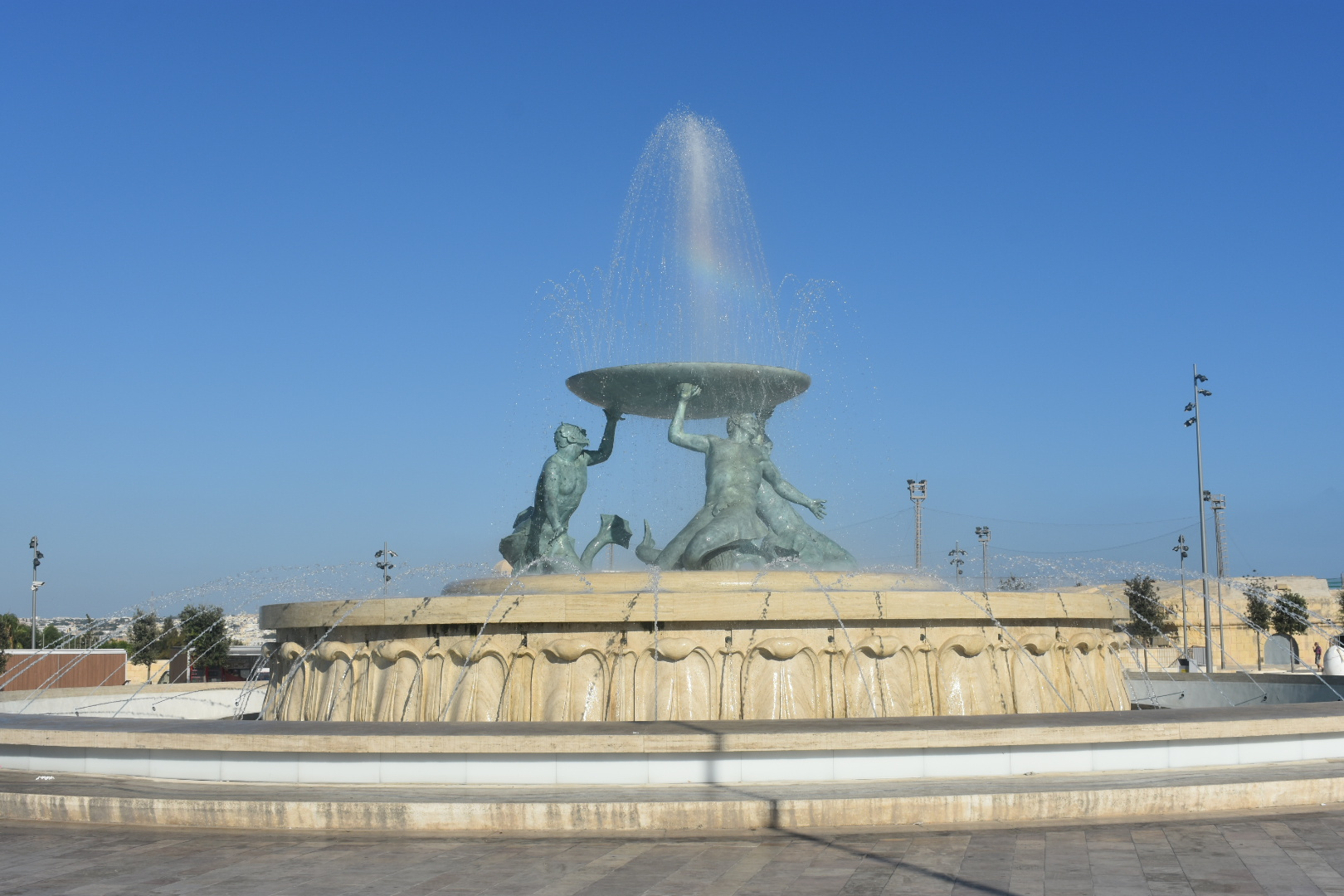
The Triton Fountain in Valletta, which was designed by Apap together with the designer Victor Anastasi

Apap was born in Valletta in 1909, and he was the older brother of the musician Joseph Apap and the painter William Apap. He attended the government central school, and in 1920 he began to attend evening classes in modelling and drawing. He was one of the first students to enroll in the newly established School of Art in 1925, where he studied sculpture under Antonio Micallef. In 1927, he won a scholarship to the British Academy of Arts in Rome, studying under the renowned Maltese sculptor Antonio Sciortino.

He returned to Malta in 1930, and soon afterwards he won his first commission, the Fra Diego monument in Ħamrun. This made him well known within Malta's art scene, and he regularly exhibited his works at the Malta Art Amateur Association exhibitions throughout the 1930s. He was appointed assistant modelling teacher at the School of Art in 1934, becoming head of school in 1947. He remained there until his retirement in 1971, but was recalled seven years later in 1978.

Patrons of Apap's work included the Lieutenant Governor of Malta Sir Harry Luke as well as Lord Mountbatten, whose family still has some of Apap's best sculptures. In the 1960s, two exhibitions of his and his brother William Apap' work were held in London.

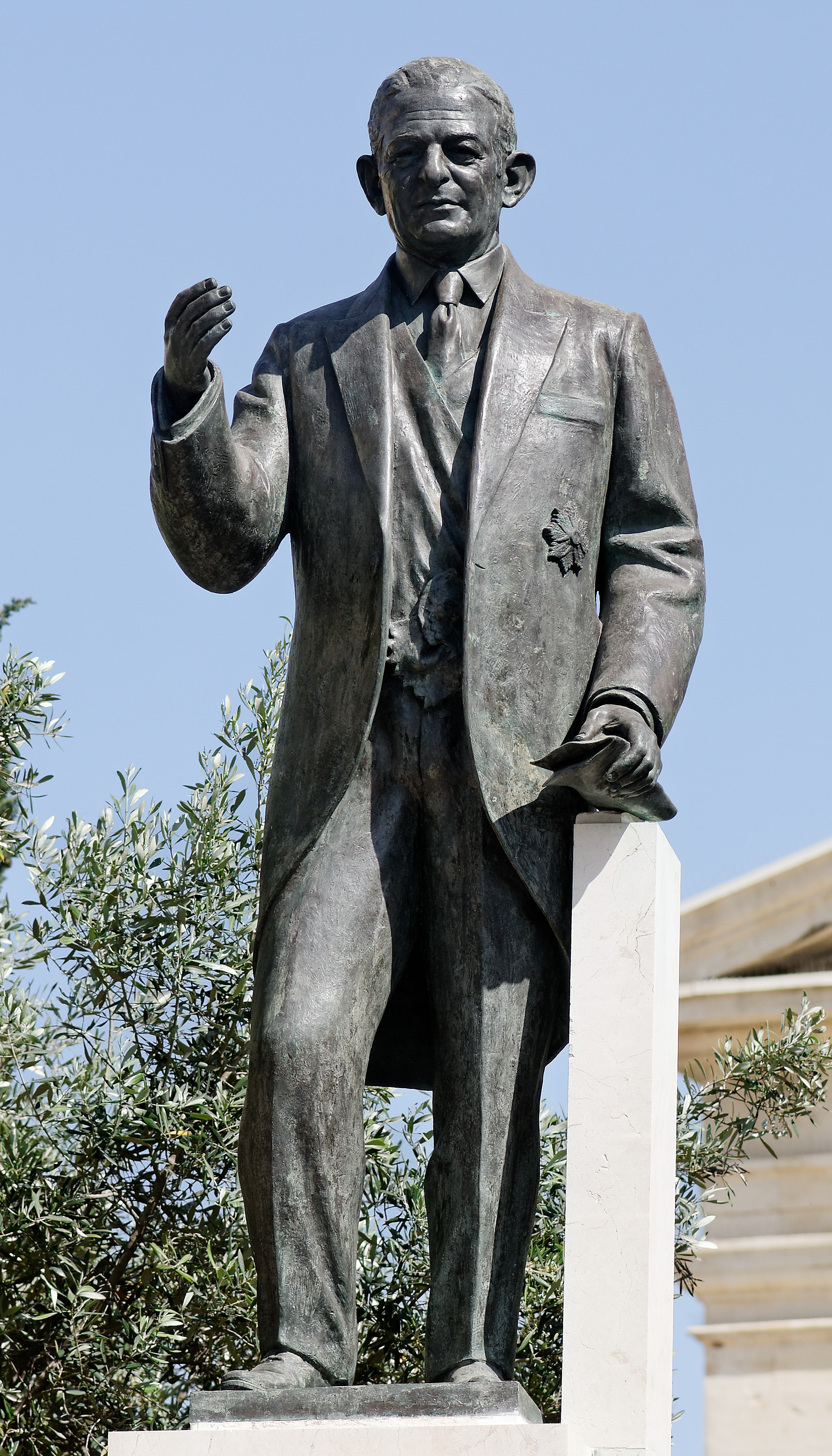
Statue of George Borg Olivier at Castille Square, Valletta (1990)

Apap's best-known works include various public monuments in Valletta, such as the Triton Fountain (1959), the bust of Enrico Mizzi (1964), the statue of Paul Boffa (1976) and the statue of George Borg Olivier (1990). Other notable works by Apap include statues in the Rotunda of Mosta, the Church of St. Augustine in Valletta, the Mdina Cathedral, St. George's Basilica in Gozo, the Qawra Parish Church, St Helen's Basilica in Birkirkara and the Jesus of Nazareth Parish Church in Sliema. His last major work was a bust of Guido de Marco which was completed when he was 89 years old. The motifs of the theatre at Palazzo Carafa in Valletta were designed by Apap.

Apap married Maria Bencini in 1941, and they had three children: John, Nella and Manon. He died in 2003 at the age of 93.

== Awards and honours ==
- Officer of the Order of the British Empire (1956)
- Gold medal of the Society of Arts, Manufacture and Commerce (1965)
- Cavaliere Ufficiale Repubblica Italiana (1968)
- Order of Merit (1993)

He was nominated a knight of the Sovereign Military Order of Malta in 1963.

== See also ==
- Statue of Lord Beaverbrook - A sculpture by Apap in Fredericton, New Brunswick, Canada
