= Matriculation Certificate (Malta) =

School qualification in Malta

The Matriculation Certificate is a qualification awarded to students leaving the secondary school system of Malta and intending to matriculate into the University of Malta. The Matriculation Certificate examinations are equivalent to the British A Level and are normally referred to as so conventionally in Malta.

Students are required to sit for six subjects from various areas in one session of the examination. The choice of subjects includes a language, a humanities or a business subject, mathematics or a science subject, and any other two subjects. The sixth subject is Systems of Knowledge, which is compulsory. Two of the subjects must be at Advanced level, three at Intermediate level and Systems of Knowledge, which is also rated as an Intermediate level subject. The certificate was first offered in 1997, when it was awarded to 1309 candidates. In 2005 there were 2455 candidates.

In order for a student to be successfully awarded the Matriculation Certificate students must achieve both of following criteria:

- Achieve a pass in at least groups 1,2 and 3.
- Have a total of 44 points (using the below system)

Students must be awarded this certificate in order to be accepted into the University of Malta. In addition, some courses at the university also require specific subjects at specific grades. This is the case for courses such as engineering, medicine, science, and commerce.

== Choice of subjects ==
Subjects are divided into 4 groups. Each group representing Languages, Humanities, Sciences and Practical/Technical subjects. A student must choose one of each of the first three groups, and another two subjects chosen from any of the groups.

1. Maltese, Arabic, English, French, German, Greek, Italian, Latin, Spanish;
2. Accounting, Classical Studies*, Economics, Geography, History, Marketing, Philosophy, Psychology*, Religious Knowledge, Sociology;
3. Applied Mathematics (Mechanics), Biology, Chemistry, Computing, Environmental Science*, Physics, Pure Mathematics;
4. Art, Engineering Drawing, Graphical Communication, Home Economics and Human Ecology, Information Technology, Music, Physical Education*, Theatre and Performance,

Systems of Knowledge*.

items marked * are offered at Intermediate Level only.

== Grading ==
Grades are given from A-F, with A being the best, and F indicating a Fail. Each grade obtained gives the candidates a number of points, which when added up can be used to give an overall grade.

Advanced Level                                 Intermediate Level
Grade A - 30 grade points                      Grade A - 10 grade points
Grade B - 24 grade points                      Grade B - 8 grade points
Grade C - 18 grade points                      Grade C - 6 grade points
Grade D - 12 grade points                      Grade D - 4 grade points
Grade E - 6 grade points                       Grade E - 2 grade points.

After adding up the points, the following may be used to calculate the overall grade:

Grade A - 80 -100 grade points
Grade B - 64 - 78 grade points
Grade C - 44 - 62 grade points
