= No. 126 Squadron RAF =

Defunct flying squadron of the Royal Air Force

No. 126 (Persian Gulf) Squadron RAF
- Active: 1 March 1918 – 17 August 1918; 28 June 1941 – 10 March 1946
- Country: United Kingdom
- Branch: Royal Air Force
- Nickname: Persian Gulf
- Motto: "Foremost in attack"

Insignia
- Squadron Badge: A Maltese Cross under a laurel wreath.
- Squadron Codes: V (Jun 1942 – Dec 1942); MK (Dec 1942 – May 1943); 5J (Apr 1943 – Mar 1946)

No. 126 (Persian Gulf) Squadron RAF was a Royal Air Force Squadron formed to be a day bomber unit in World War I and reformed as a fighter unit in World War II.

== History ==
=== Formation and First World War ===
No. 126 Squadron Royal Flying Corps was formed on 1 March 1918 and became a unit of the Royal Air Force a month later, but it disbanded on 17 August 1918.

=== Reformation in the Second World War ===
The squadron reformed in 1941 as a fighter unit equipped with Hawker Hurricanes and was stationed in Malta to provide air defence for the island. It was re-equipped with Supermarine Spitfires and then operated from Sicily and Italy. It moved to the UK in April 1944 and was disbanded on 10 March 1946 after a period equipped with the North American Mustang.

== Aircraft operated ==
Aircraft operated by no. 126 Squadron RAF
From	To	Aircraft	Variant
Jun 1941	Mar 1942	Hawker Hurricane	IIA
Jun 1941	Mar 1942	Hawker Hurricane	IIB
Mar 1942	Mar 1944	Supermarine Spitfire	VB
Mar 1942	Mar 1944	Supermarine Spitfire	VC
Mar 1943	Nov 1943	Supermarine Spitfire	IX
Apr 1944	Dec 1944	Supermarine Spitfire	IXB
Dec 1944	Apr 1946	North American Mustang	II
Aug 1945	Mar 1946	North American Mustang	IV
Feb 1946	Mar 1946	Supermarine Spitfire	LF XVIE
