= H. Craig Hanna =

American painter

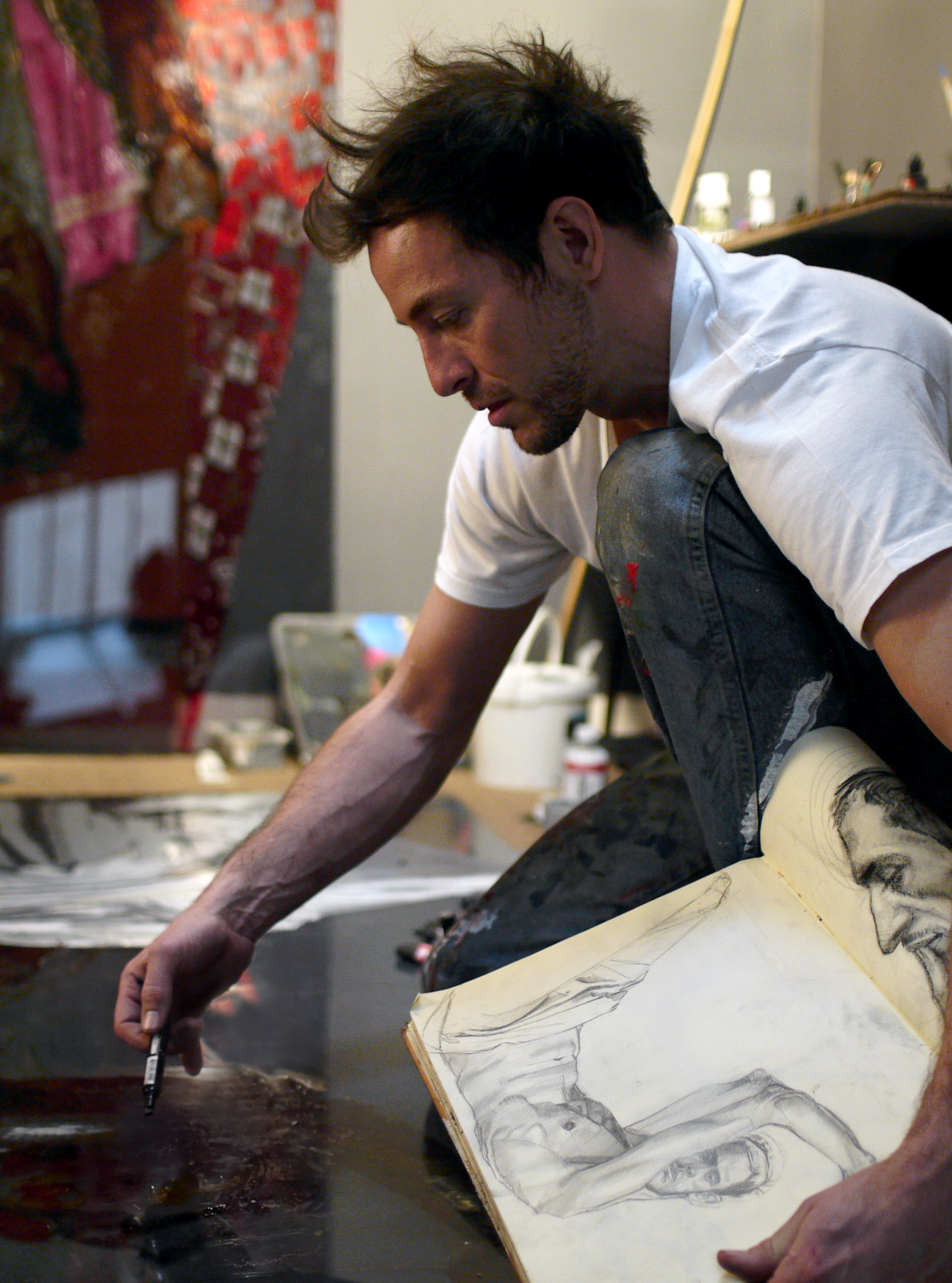
- Born: 1967 (age 58–59); Cleveland, OH, USA
- Notable work: Carlos Sitting in a Clear Plastic Chair; Arrangement of Dancers
- Awards: BP Portrait; National Museum of History and Art
- Website: www.hcraighanna.org

H. Craig Hanna (born 1967) is an American figurative painter living in Paris.

The National Museum of History and Art (MNHA) Luxembourg, which hosted an exhibition of his work in 2016, said: "He reinterprets the history of European painting through the eyes of a master draughtsman and the unique viewpoint of an artist of his time by developing his very own technique (painting on Plexiglas) featuring striking colour effects and compositions."

In addition to Paris, he has lived and worked in New York, London and Malta.

== Early life and education ==
H. Craig Hanna was born in Cleveland, Ohio in 1967. He has been drawing since his childhood. He earned his BFA from Syracuse University in 1994, and his MFA from the School of Visual Arts in 1996. He started doing figurative classical painting from life at that time. His teacher John Foot introduced him to the great masters of figurative painting, such as Rembrandt, Velasquez, Sargent and Ingres. The Metropolitan Museum of Art played an important role in Hanna's artistic education.

In 1998, Bergdorf Goodman held Hanna's first solo show in New York. Since, he has had shows in London, Hong Kong and Malta.

Shortlisted in 2001 and 2006 for the National Portrait Gallery Portrait Award, he was rewarded in 2001 for his work Carlos Sitting on a Clear Plastic Chair.

After his first Parisian exhibition in June 2008, he chose to settle in Paris. In September 2008, Laurence Esnol Gallery opened to solely represent Hanna's works.

== Art ==
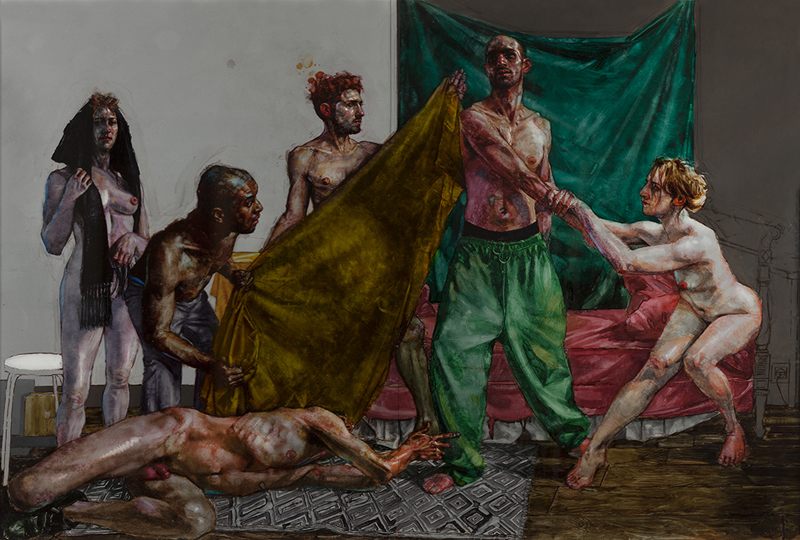
Arrangement of Dancers, 2014

Hanna's work continues in the tradition of Ancient Masters. His choices in terms of framing, color, composition and model root him in his time and century. His influences range from classical western painting (Titian, Rembrandt, Velasquez) to masters of the 19th century (Sargent, Whistler) and the 20th century (Klimt, Schiele, Lucian Freud). Ancient Greek sculpture is also a major source of inspiration.

His portraits convey a strong human dimension, with particular emphasis on the subject's vulnerability, mitigated by a sense of benevolence. Hanna often chooses his models according to their distinctive intensity. Each portrait is hence an expression of the model's singularity.

Hanna's technical mastery expresses itself in many ways, from oil paint on wood or canvas to works on paper (oil pastel, pencil, charcoal). The use of reverse plexiglas paint was a breakthrough in his work. Experimenting with the possibilities of this technique, playing with the effects of depth and transparency for instance, enabled him to explore new artistic paths.

Journalist and art critic Christopher Mooney describes his work:

"While antecedents are visible in HANNA's pictures, in both their contents and surfaces (...) Hanna pushes past these to create vital works that are brashly contemporary and unmistakably his own. He does so by eschewing, even sabotaging, the strategies of most contemporary figurative painting: he chooses his subjects from 'life' instead of photographs; he roots his formal concerns—line, color, brushstroke, scale—in painterly traditions; and, borrowing a forgotten form of outsider 'folk' art—fixé sous verre in French, Hinterglasmalerei in German, 'reverse-painting' in English —he inverts the usual process of painting by doing it backwards, on Plexiglas."

== Recognition and honors ==
In 2001, Hanna was commended in the London National Portrait Gallery contest for his painting Carlos Sitting in a Clear Plastic Chair.

His work was exhibited at the Orangerie du Sénat in Paris in 2010 and the National Fine Art Museum in Malta in 2006.

Hanna's Arrangement of Dancers was acquired by the MNHA in 2015. The museum held a retrospective of his work in March 2016.

== Exhibitions ==
- March–June 2016: H. Craig HANNA, Peintures et Dessins, MNHA, Luxembourg
- February–April 2014: Landscapes, Laurence Esnol Gallery, Paris
- January 2012: BRAFA 2012, Brussels, Laurence Esnol Gallery
- November 2011: St’Art, Strasburg, Laurence Esnol Gallery
- October 2011: SHOW Off, Paris, Laurence Esnol Gallery
- May 2011: Art by Genève, Geneva, Laurence Esnol Gallery
- January 2011: BRAFA 2011, Brussels, Laurence Esnol Gallery
- November 2010: St’Art, Strasburg, Laurence Esnol Gallery
- October 2010: SHOW Off, Paris, Laurence Esnol Gallery
- August 2010: Orangerie du Sénat, Sénat, Paris, Laurence Esnol Gallery
- April 2010: Lille Art Fair, Lille, Laurence Esnol Gallery
- March 2010: Chic Dessin, Paris, Laurence Esnol Gallery
- March 2010: Pavillon des Arts et du Design, Paris, Laurence Esnol Gallery
- December 2009: St’Art, Strasburg, Laurence Esnol Gallery
- November 2009: Art en Capitale, Paris, Laurence Esnol Gallery
- September 2009: Salon des Collectionneurs, Paris, Laurence Esnol Gallery
- June 2009: Scope Art Basel, Basel, Laurence Esnol Gallery
- March 200: Art Paris 09, Paris, Laurence Esnol Gallery
- April 2008: SLICK Dessin, Paris, Cynthia Corbett Gallery
- March 2008: SOBO GALLERY, solo show, Cynthia Corbett Gallery London Bermondsey Street
- March 2008: Red Dot, Cynthia Corbett Gallery, New York
- February 2008: Nouveauté Gallery, Habitat, solo show, Kings Road, London
- August 2007: Cuccumio Gallery, solo show, Sardinia
- March 2007: Blenhiem Gallery, Three Yellows, solo show, Notting Hill, London
- June 2006: National Portrait Gallery BP Portrait Award, London
- April 2006: National Museum of Fine Arts, solo show, Malta
- September 2002: Westbourne Studios, Gimme Five group show, London
- June 2001: National Portrait Gallery BP, Portrait Award, London
- June 2001: The Brick House Gallery, solo show, Brick Lan, London
- September 2000: The Oxo Gallery, group show, London
- February 2000: Galerie Martini, solo show, Wellington Street, Hong Kong
- December 1999: Blains Fine Art, group show, Bruton Street, London
- November 1999: Groucho Club, solo show, Dean Street, London
- July 1998: Lehman Sann Gallery, group show, Broadway, New York
- June 1998: Gallery At Bergdorf Goodman, solo show, Fifth Avenue, New York
- May 1997: Belgrade Gallery, solo show, Wooster Street, New York
- February 1997: Space Gallery, solo show, Broadway, New York
- March 1996: School of Visual Art Degree Show, New York

== Bibliography ==
- H. Craig Hanna, Peintures et Dessins, co-published by Editions Michèle and Laurence Esnol Gallery
- Sketchbook by H. Craig Hanna, co-published by Somogy Éditions d'Art and Laurence Esnol Gallery
