= Malta =

Mediterranean island country

Republic of Malta Repubblika ta' Malta
- Flag Coat of arms
- Motto: Virtute et constantia (Latin) ("By strength and persistence")
- Anthem: "L-Innu Malti" (Maltese) ("The Maltese Hymn")
- Location of Malta (green circle) – in Europe (light green & dark grey) – in the European Union (light green) – [Legend]
- Capital: Valletta; 35°54′N 14°31′E
- Largest settlement: St. Paul's Bay; 35°56′54″N 14°24′6″E
- Official languages: Maltese; English; Maltese Sign Language
- Recognised national languages: Maltese
- Common languages: Maltenglish
- Other languages: Italian (66% conversational)
- Ethnic groups (2021): 77.7% Maltese; 22.3% other ethnic groups
- Religion (2021): 88.5% Christianity; 82.6% Catholicism (official); 5.9% other Christian; 5.1% no religion; 3.9% Islam; 1.4% Hinduism; 1.1% other
- Demonym: Maltese
- Government: Unitary parliamentary republic
  - President: Myriam Spiteri Debono
  - Prime Minister: Robert Abela
- Legislature: Parliament of Malta

Independence from the United Kingdom
  - State of Malta: 21 September 1964
  - Republic: 13 December 1974

Area
  - Total: 316 km^{2} (122 sq mi) (187th)
  - Water (%): 0.001

Population
  - 2025 census: 588,254
  - Density: 1,649/km^{2} (4,270.9/sq mi) (9th)
- GDP (PPP): 2026 estimate
  - Total: ▲$46.813 billion (135th)
  - Per capita: ▲$80,020 (17th)
- GDP (nominal): 2026 estimate
  - Total: ▲$30.712 billion (117th)
  - Per capita: ▲$52,149 (24th)
- Gini (2020): ▲31.4 medium inequality
- HDI (2023): ▲0.924 very high (24th)
- Currency: Euro (€) (EUR)
- Time zone: UTC+1 (CET)
  - Summer (DST): UTC+2 (CEST)
- Calling code: +356
- ISO 3166 code: MT
- Internet TLD: .mt^{[b]}
- 1. 2021 Malta census Chapter 4: Racial Origin according to the most recent national census. Meanwhile 77.8% of the population were Maltese citizens or nationals.; 2. Also .eu, shared with other European Union member states

Malta, (Note: /ˈmɒltə/ MOL-tə or /ˈmɔːltə/ MAWL-tə, Maltese: [ˈmɐːltɐ].) officially the Republic of Malta, (Note: Maltese: Repubblika ta' Malta [rɛˈpʊbːlɪkɐ tɐ ˈmɐːltɐ].) is an island country located in the central Mediterranean Sea. It consists of a number of islands, of which Malta and Gozo are the two main ones—south of Italy, east of Tunisia, and north of Libya. Valletta is the country's capital. Malta is the world's tenth-smallest country by area, ninth-most densely populated, and 166th most populated. It consists of a single urban region, because of which it is often described as a city-state. The two official languages are Maltese—recognised as the national language—and English.

The island of Malta has been inhabited since at least 6500 BC, during the Mesolithic period. Its location at the centre of the Mediterranean has historically given it great geostrategic importance, with multiple powers having ruled the islands and shaped its culture and society. Included among these powers the Phoenicians, Carthaginians, Greeks, and Romans in antiquity; the Arabs, Normans, and Aragonese during the Middle Ages; and the Knights Hospitaller, French, and British in the modern era.

Malta came under British rule as a crown colony in the early 19th century and served as the headquarters of the British Mediterranean Fleet. It was sieged by the Axis powers during World War II and was also an Allied base for its area. The country gained independence in 1964, and established its current parliamentary republic in 1974. It has been a member state of the Commonwealth of Nations and the United Nations since its independence, joining the European Union (EU) in 2004 and the eurozone monetary union in 2008. Malta's history of foreign rule and its proximity to both Europe and North Africa have influenced its art, music, cuisine, and architecture. It has close historical and cultural ties to Italy, especially to the island of Sicily, with 66 percent of Maltese people speaking or having significant knowledge of the Italian language. The country was an early centre of Christianity, and Catholicism is the state religion, although the country's constitution guarantees freedom of religion.

Malta is now a developed country with an advanced, high-income economy. It is heavily reliant on tourism, attracting travellers because of its warm climate, recreational areas, and architectural and historical monuments.

== Etymology ==
The English name Malta derives from classical Latin Melita, from Latinised forms of the ancient Greek Melítē (Μελίτη), of uncertain meaning, possibly from the Phoenician Maleth. The name Melítē—shared by the Croatian island Mljet in antiquity—literally means "place of honey" or "place of sweetness", derived from the combining form of méli (μέλι, honey or any similarly sweet thing), and the suffix -ē (-η). The ancient Greeks may have named the island this after Malta's endemic subspecies of bees.

Other scholars, however, argue for derivation of the Greek name from an original Phoenician or Punic Maleth (𐤌𐤋𐤈, mlṭ), meaning "haven", "refuge", or "port", in reference to its Grand Harbour and its primary settlement at Cospicua following the rise in sea level that separated the Maltese islands and flooded their original coastal settlements in the 10th century BC. The name was then applied to all of Malta by the Greeks and to its ancient capital by the Romans.

== History ==
=== Prehistory ===
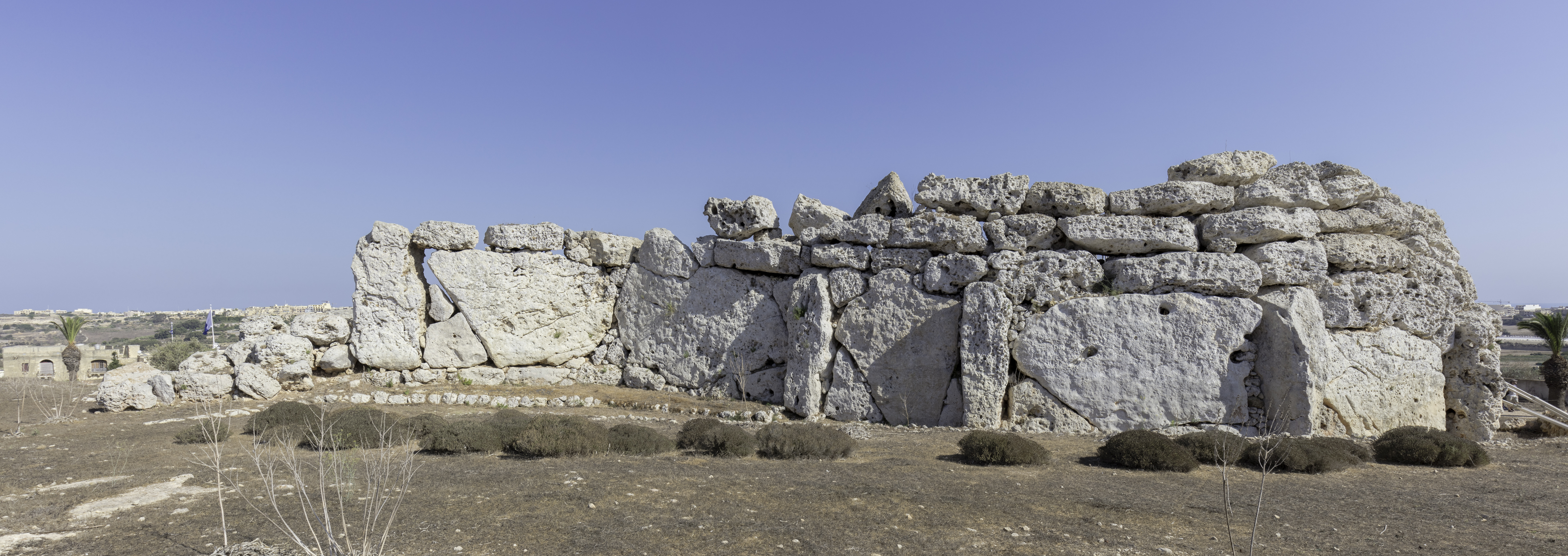
Ġgantija, a megalithic temple complex

The earliest reliable evidence of human habitation of Malta dates to 6500 BC with the arrival of Mesolithic era hunter-gatherers, likely from Sicily as evidenced by the finds in Latnija Cave on the northern part of the island of Malta. Neolithic farmers, also originating from Sicily, are thought to have arrived on the islands by around 5400 BC, who brought domesticated animals and cereal crops. Prehistoric settlements dating to the Early Neolithic era include the Għar Dalam cave site in the uppermost layers.

Later, the Maltese started to build megalithic temples. Around 3500 BC, these people built some of the world's oldest existing free-standing structures in the form of the Ġgantija temples on Gozo. Other early temples include those at Ħaġar Qim and Mnajdra. These temples are among the oldest free standing megalithic structures in the world, constructed even before the Egyptian pyramids.

After 2500 BC, Malta was depopulated until came an influx of immigrants, a culture that cremated its dead and introduced smaller structures called dolmens as tombs. They likely belonged to a different population from the builders of the previous temples. The dolmens are generally about 4 metres (13 ft) long and less than 1 metre (3 ft) high.

=== Phoenicians, Carthaginians, and Romans ===
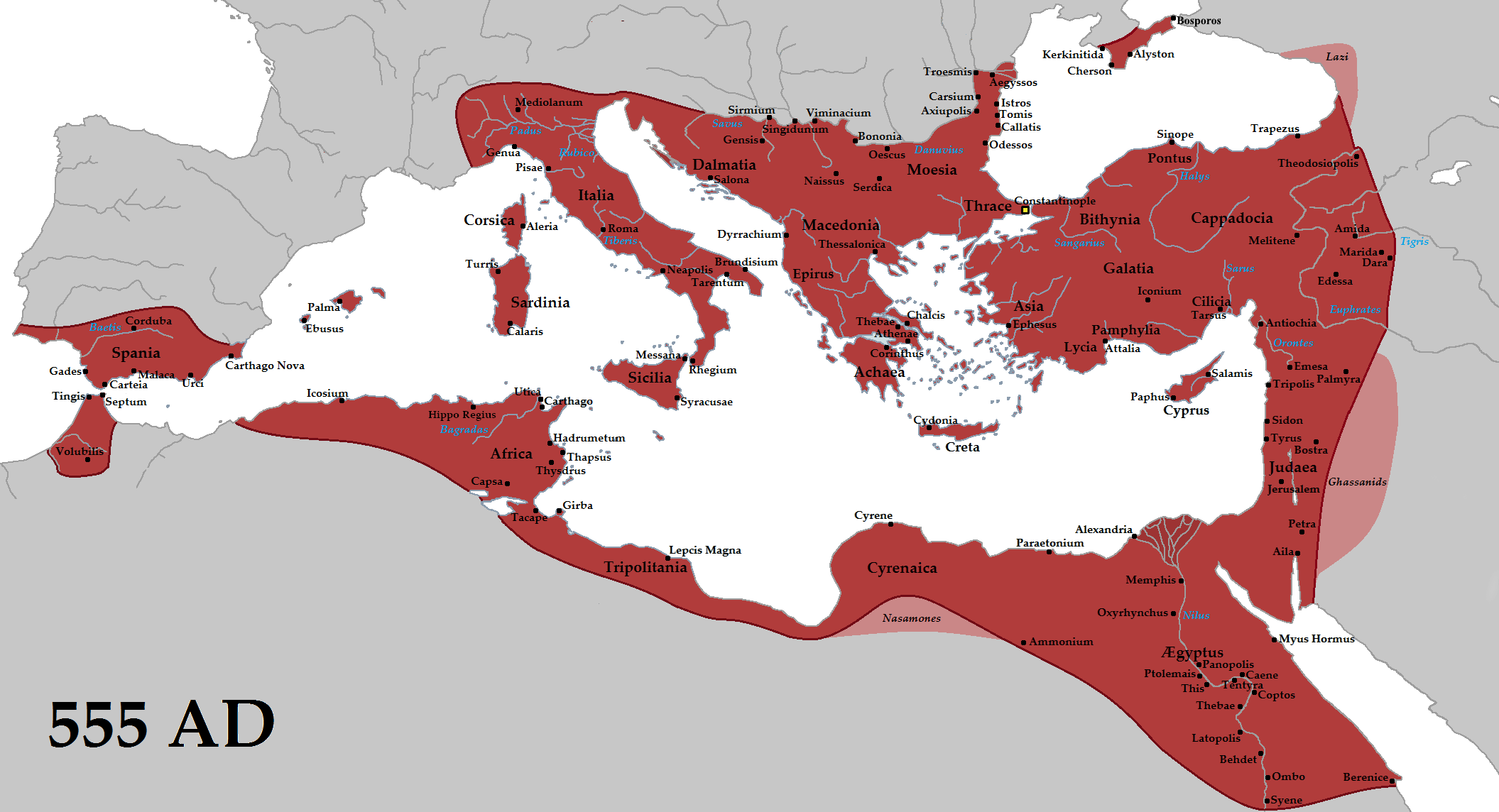
The lands making up modern-day Malta was once a part of the Byzantine Empire (its vassals in pink).

Phoenician traders colonised the islands at some time around 1000 BC, having conquered most of the Mediterranean at that time. Their seat of government was at Mdina, and their primary port at Cospicua on the Grand Harbour, which they called Maleth. After the fall of Phonecia, the area came under the control of Carthage. During this time, the people of Malta primarily produced perishable goods, such as textiles.

It is unsure if Roman rule began after the first or second Punic war, although Malta was held by Rome after the second, after it was surrendered by Hamilcar, a son of Gisco, having been conquered by Titus Sempronius Longus, a Roman consul. After, the Denarius started becoming the only currency, allowing for better trading.

In 395, when the Roman Empire was divided for the last time at the death of Theodosius I, Malta and Sicily fell under the control of the Western Roman Empire. As that empire declined during Europe's Migration Period, Malta was conquered or occupied a number of times. In 454, the islands were subdued by the Vandals and the Ostrogoths (Germanic tribes) in 464. In 533, Belisarius, a Byzantine general, and his army went to conquer the Vandal Kingdom in North Africa, and reunited the islands under Byzantine rule. Little is known about Byzantine Malta: the island depended on the theme of Sicily and had Greek governors and a small Greek garrison. Although the bulk of the population continued to consist of the old Latinised dwellers, Malta's religious allegiance oscillated between the pope and the patriarch of Constantinople. Byzantine rule introduced Greek families to the Maltese collective. Malta remained in the Byzantine Empire until 870, when it was conquered by the Arabs.

=== Arab period and the Middle Ages ===
Malta became involved in the Arab–Byzantine wars, and its conquest is linked with the Muslim conquest of Sicily that began in 827 after Admiral Euphemius killed Constantine V. The Muslim chronicler and geographer Ibn ʿAbd al-Munʿim al-Ḥimyarī recounts that, in 870, following a violent struggle against the defending Byzantines, the Arab invaders—first led by Halaf al-Hadim and later by Sawada ibn Muhammad—pillaged the island, destroying the most important buildings and leaving it practically uninhabited until it was recolonised by the Arabs.

Malta was a settlement for Banu Matkud, a vassalised tribal city state of the Berbers, from Misrata during both the Fatimid Caliphate and the Aghlabid dynasty. It is uncertain whether this new settlement resulted from demographic expansion in Sicily, a higher standard of living in Sicily, or the civil war that broke out among the rulers of Sicily in 1038. The Siculo-Arabic language from Sicily was adopted on the island, eventually evolving into the Maltese language.

=== Norman conquest ===
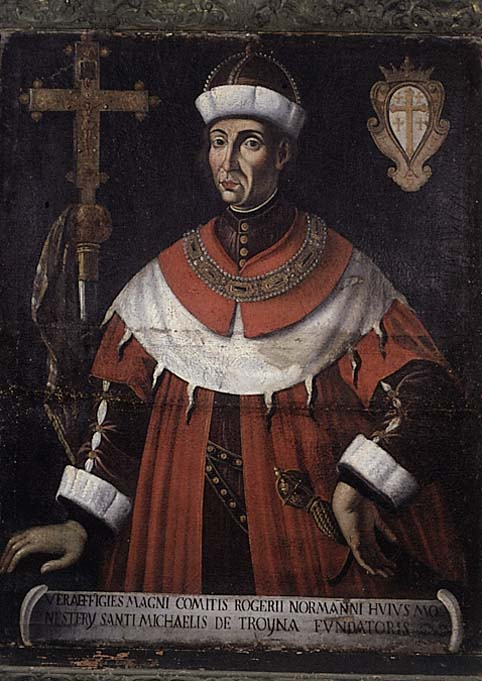
Roger I of Sicily, who returned Malta to Christian rule

The Normans attacked Malta in 1091 as part of their conquest of Sicily. Their leader, Roger I of Sicily, was welcomed by the Christians, who came out from Muslim rule. Malta became part of the new Kingdom of Sicily, which also covered the southern Italian Peninsula. The Catholic Church was reinstated as the state religion, with Malta under the Archdiocese of Palermo, and some Norman architecture sprang up around Malta, especially in its previous capital, Mdina.

Because of the strategic importance of the islands, they were particularly coveted, and it was during this time that the men of Malta were militarised to fend off attempted conquest. King Tancred made Malta a fief and installed a count of Malta in 1192. The early counts were privateers of Genoese ancestry.

The kingdom passed on to the German Hohenstaufen dynasty from 1194 until 1266. As Emperor Frederick II began to reorganise the Sicilian kingdom, Western culture and religion started to exert their influence more intensely. Malta was declared a county and a marquisate, but its trade was destroyed and for a long time it remained solely a fortified garrison.

A mass expulsion of Arabs occurred in 1224, and the entire male Christian population of Celano, Italy in Abruzzo was deported to Malta in the same year. In 1249, the Holy Roman Emperor Frederick II decreed that all remaining Muslims be either expelled from Malta or compelled to convert. In 1266, the kingdom passed to the French Capetian House of Anjou, but high taxes made the dynasty unpopular in Malta, due in part to Charles of Anjou's war against the Republic of Genoa, and the island of Gozo was sacked in 1275.

=== Crown of Aragon and the Knights of Malta ===
Kingdom of Sicily's flag

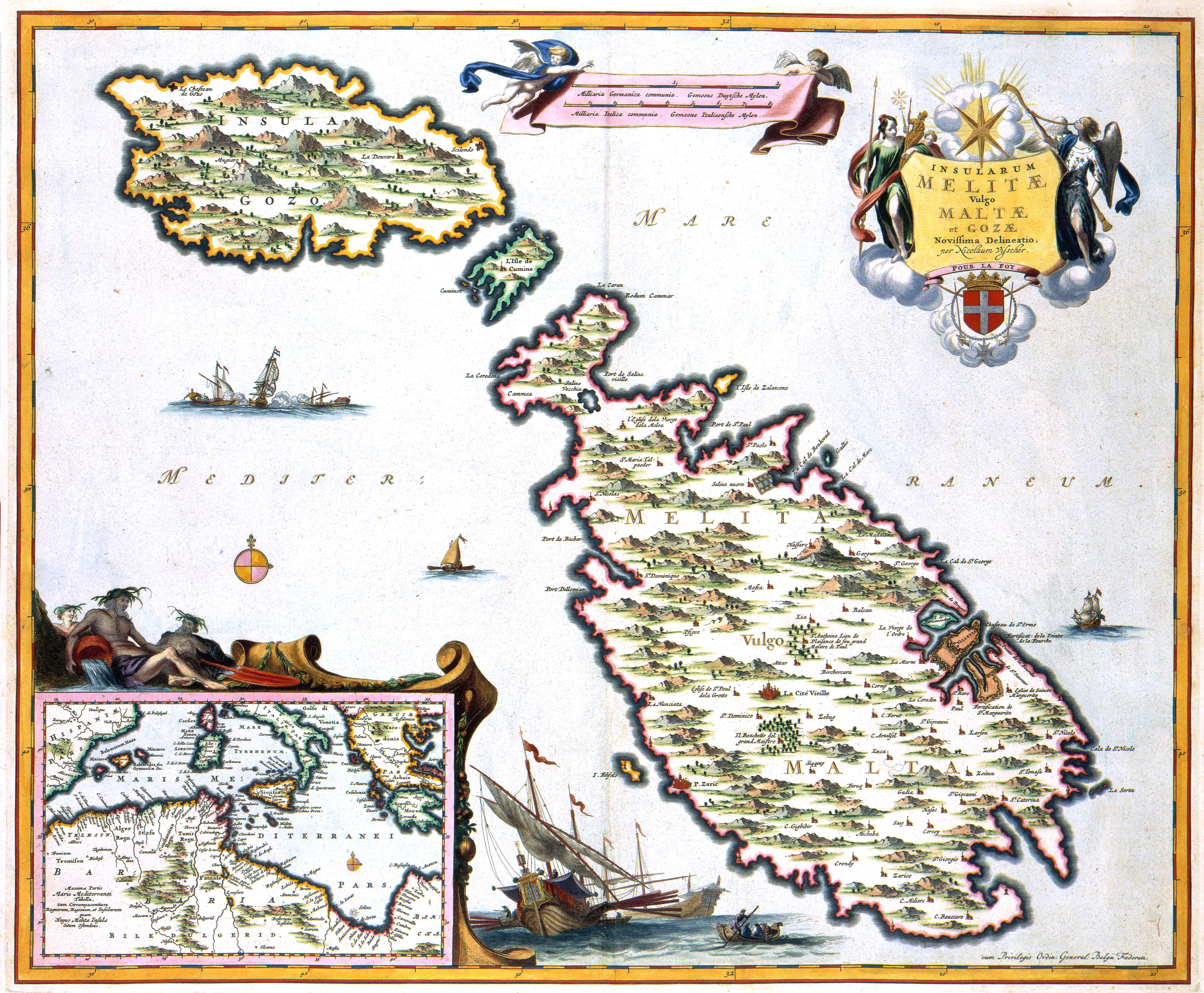
Map of Malta and Gozo by Dutch cartographer Nicolaes Visscher II, around 1690

Malta was ruled by the Catalan House of Barcelona, the ruling dynasty of the Crown of Aragon, from 1282 to 1409, which aided Aragonese Malta in the Sicilian Vespers in the naval battle in Grand Harbour in 1283. Relatives of the crown ruled Malta until it formally passed to the Crown of Aragon.

Early in the Aragonese ascendancy, the sons of the monarchs received the title Count of Malta. During this time, much of the local nobility was created, but by 1397 the bearing of the title of count reverted to a feudal basis with two families fighting over the distinction. This led King Martin I of Sicily to abolish the title, but it returned a few years later. The Maltese, led by the local nobility, rose up against Count Gonsalvo Monroy although they voiced their loyalty to the Sicilian Crown, which impressed King Alfonso V of Aragon to the extent that he did not punish Malta, and chose never to grant the title to a third party, moving it back under the crown's control.

On 23 March 1530, the Holy Roman Emperor Charles V gave the islands to the Knights Hospitaller under the leadership of the French Philippe Villiers de L'Isle-Adam, for which they had to pay an annual tribute of a Maltese falcon. These knights, a military religious order also known as the Order of Saint John and later as the Knights of Malta, had been driven from the Greek island of Rhodes by the Ottoman Empire in 1522. The Knights ruled Malta until 1798. During this period, the island's strategic and military importance grew as the Knights' efficient fleet launched attacks from this new base, targeting the shipping lanes of the Ottoman territories around the Mediterranean.

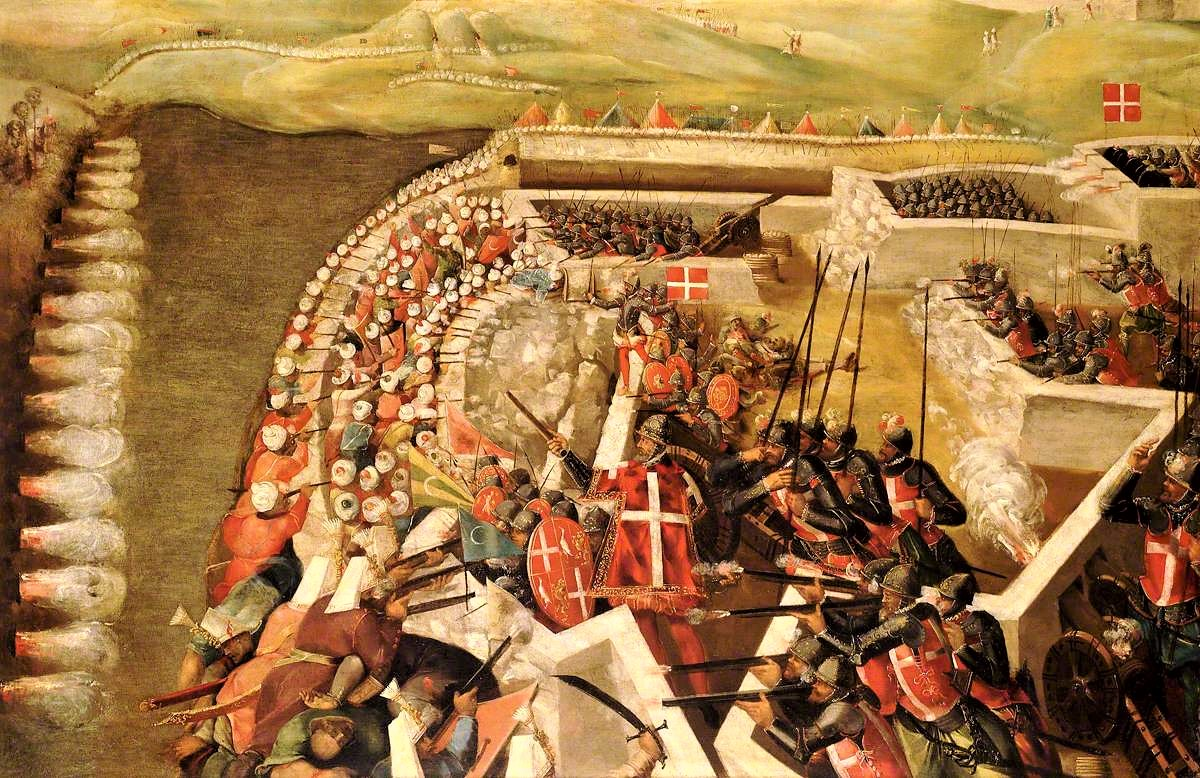
Ottoman attack on Castilian knights' post, 21 August 1565

Led by the French Jean Parisot de Valette, the Knights withstood the Siege of Malta by the Ottomans in 1565 with the help of Portuguese, Spanish, and Maltese forces. After the siege, the Knights increased Malta's fortifications, particularly in the inner-harbour area, where the new city of Valletta was built.

=== French period and British conquest ===
The Knights' reign ended when Napoleon captured Malta on his way to Egypt during the French Revolutionary Wars in 1798. From 12 to 18 June 1798, Napoleon resided at the Palazzo Parisio in Valletta. He reformed Maltese administration with the creation of a government commission, 12 municipalities, a public finance administration, abolition of feudal rights and slavery, and freedom to all Turkish and Jewish slaves. On the judicial level, a family code was framed and 12 judges nominated.

The French forces left behind became unpopular in Malta, mainly due to their being anti-Catholic. French financial and religious policies so angered the Maltese that they rebelled, forcing the French to depart. Great Britain, along with Naples and Sicily, sent ammunition and aid to the Maltese, and Britain also sent a navy to blockade the islands.

On 28 October 1798, British Captain Alexander Ball completed negotiations with the French garrison on Gozo for a transfer of Malta to the British. The British then transferred the island to the locals that day, and Malta was administered by Archpriest Saverio Cassar on behalf of Ferdinand III of Sicily. Gozo remained independent until Cassar was removed by the British in 1801.

The French General Claude-Henri Belgrand de Vaubois surrendered his forces in 1800. Maltese leaders thereupon gave the main island to Alexander Ball, asking that it become a British dominion, with the Maltese creating a Declaration of Rights in which they agreed to come "under the protection and sovereignty of the King of the free people, His Majesty the King of the United Kingdom of Great Britain and Ireland".

=== British Empire and World War II ===
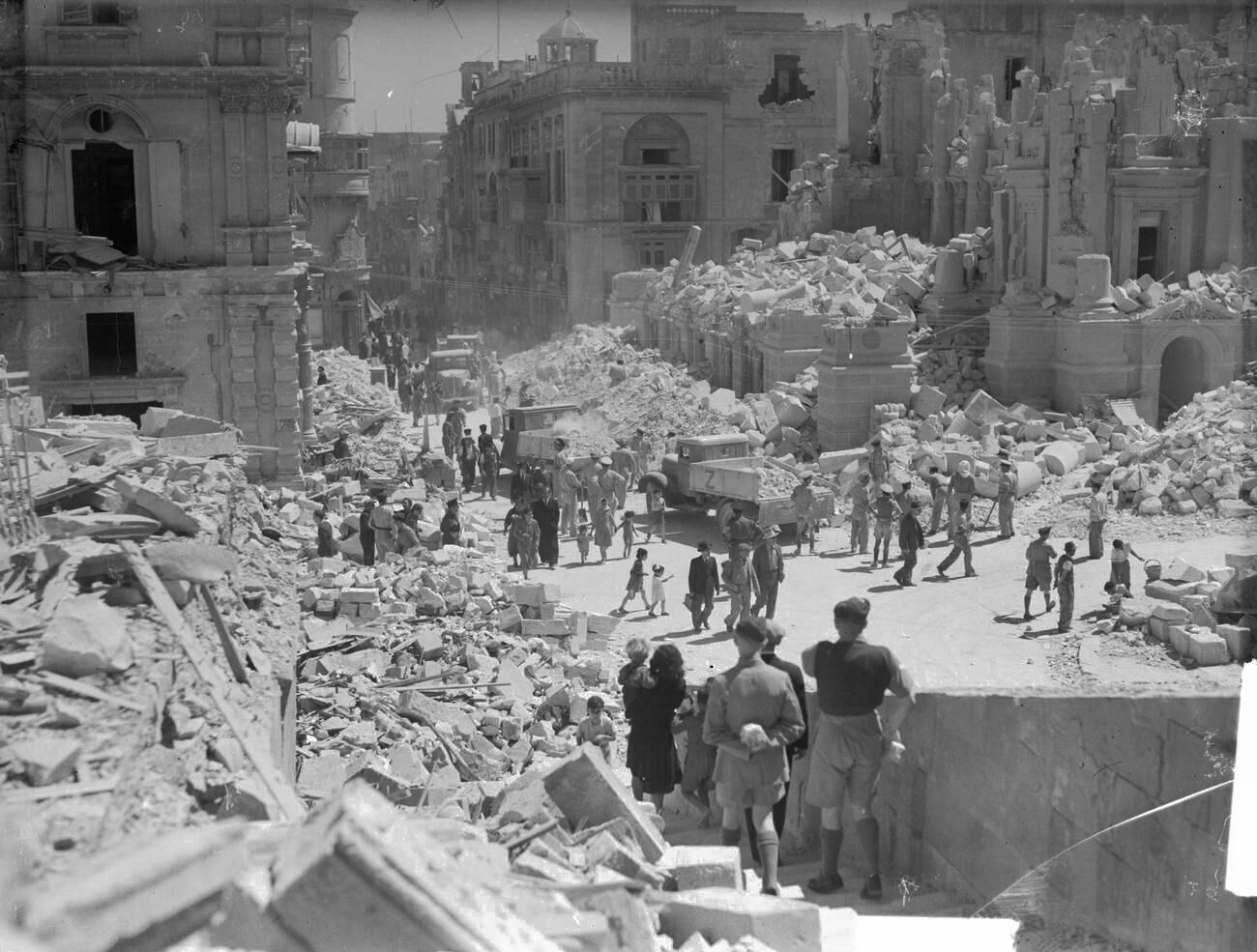
Bomb-damaged Kingsway (now Republic Street) in Valletta during siege of Malta, 1942

In 1814, as part of the Treaty of Paris, which ended the War of the Sixth Coalition, Malta officially became a part of the British Empire. Between 1915 and 1918, during World War I, Malta became known as "the Nurse of the Mediterranean," due to the large number of wounded soldiers who were accommodated there.

On 7 June 1919, the Maltese public rioted in response to a cost-of-living crisis, but British troops eventually managed to suppress the riots with four fatalities. The event, known as Sette Giugno (Italian: the 7th of June) is commemorated every year on that date, becoming one of Malta's five "National Days". Until World War II, Maltese politics was dominated by the Language Question, a dispute over whether English or Italian would be the national language.

Prior to World War II, Valletta had been the location of the Royal Navy's Mediterranean fleet headquarters. Over Winston Churchill's objections, however, the command was moved to Alexandria, Egypt, in 1937 out of fear that Valletta was too susceptible to air attacks from Europe. Indeed, because of its being a British colony as well as situated close to Sicily and Axis shipping lanes, Malta was bombarded by the Italian and German air forces. During the war, Malta played an important role for the Allies. It was used by the British to launch attacks on the Italian Navy and as a submarine base and as a listening post, intercepting German radio messages including Enigma traffic.

The Maltese defence during the second siege of Malta moved King George VI to award the George Cross to Malta collectively on 15 April 1942. Some historians argue that the award caused Britain to incur disproportionate losses in defending Malta, as British credibility would have suffered if Malta had surrendered, as occurred during the Battle of Singapore. A depiction of the George Cross now appears on the flag of Malta and the country's coat of arms.

=== Independence and Republic ===
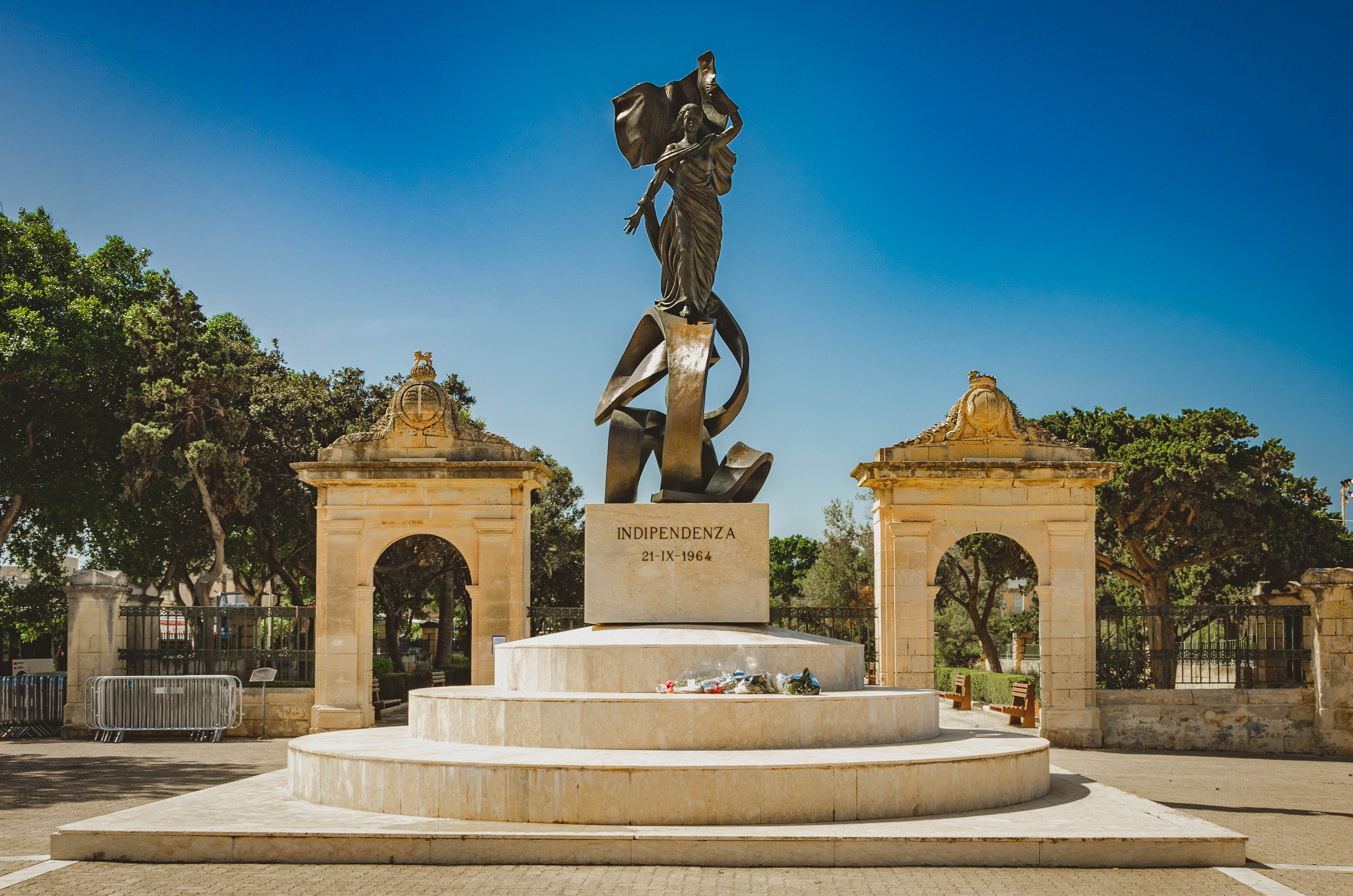
Monument to Malta's independence, Floriana

Malta gained independence as the State of Malta on 21 September 1964. Under its 1964 constitution, Malta initially retained Elizabeth II as queen of Malta and therefore head of state, with a governor-general exercising executive authority on her behalf. In 1971, however, the Malta Labour Party led by Dom Mintoff won the general elections, resulting in Malta's declaration of itself as a republic within the Commonwealth on 13 December 1974. A defence agreement was signed soon after, re-negotiated in 1972, and expired on 31 March 1979 (Freedom Day). Upon its expiry, the British base closed and lands formerly controlled by the British were given over to the Maltese government.

After the departure of the remaining British troops in 1979, the country intensified its participation in the Non-Aligned Movement, adopting a policy of neutrality in 1980. In that same year, three of Malta's sites, including the capital Valletta, were inscribed on the UNESCO World Heritage List. In 1989, Malta was the venue of a summit between United States and Soviet leaders George H. W. Bush and Mikhail Gorbachev, which marked the end of the Cold War. A referendum on Malta's joining the EU was held on 8 March 2003, with 53.65 percent in favour, after which Malta joined the EU on 1 May 2004 and the eurozone on 1 January 2008.

== Geography ==
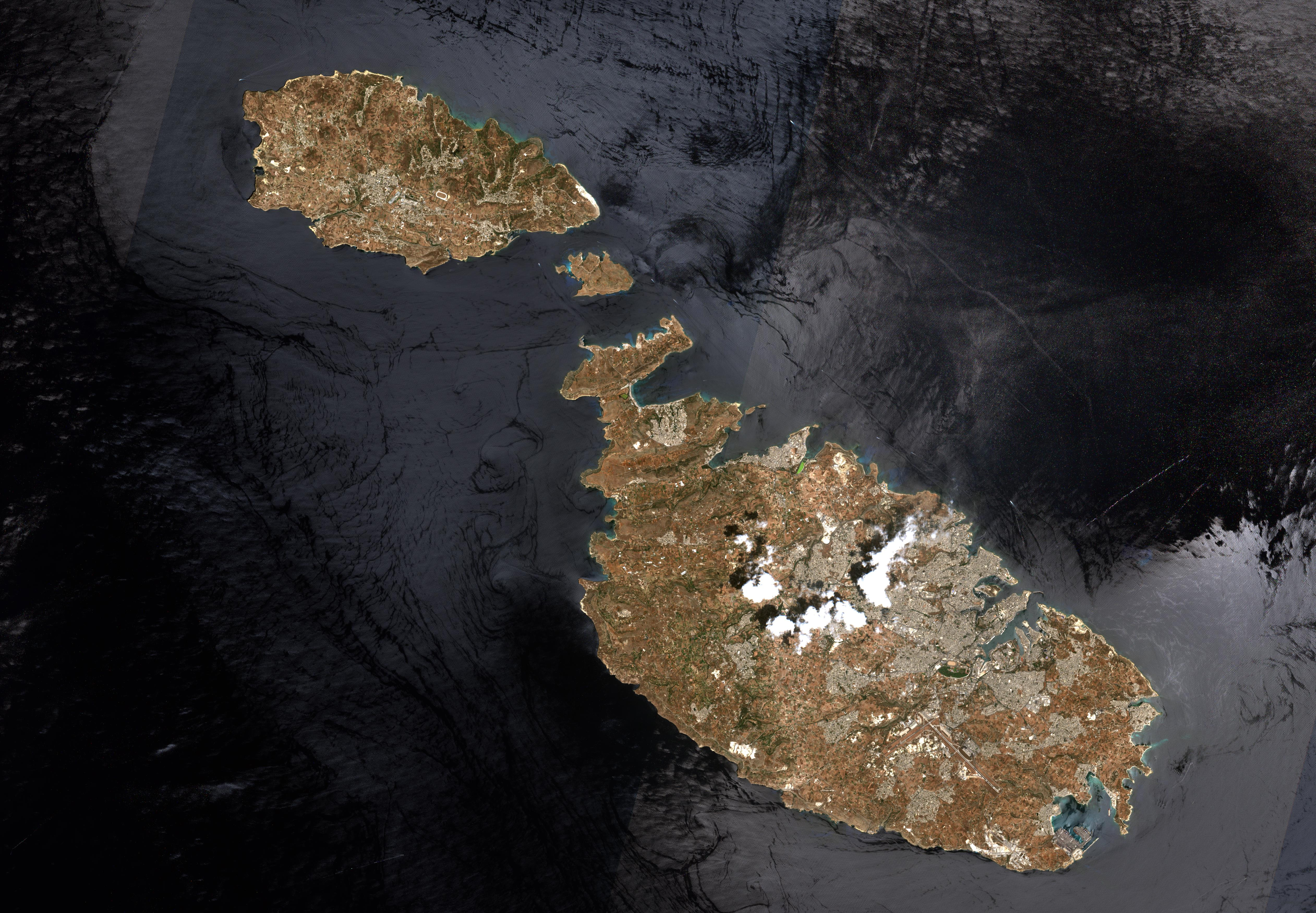
Maltese islands (satellite photo)

Malta is an archipelago in the eastern basin of the central Mediterranean Sea, some 80 km (50 mi) from southern Italy across the Malta Channel. Only the three largest islands—Malta, Gozo, and Comino— have permanent residences, though Comino is practically uninhabited. The islands of the archipelago lie on the Malta plateau, a shallow shelf formed from the high points of a land bridge between Sicily and North Africa that became isolated as sea levels rose after the last ice age. The archipelago is located on the African tectonic plate.

Malta is the largest of the three inhabited islands, as well as both the easternmost and the southernmost. It also has the largest population, and serves as the country's administrative centre. Gozo is the second largest island, and both the northernmost and the westernmost, as well as more rural. Comino is the smallest of the three islands, lying between the other two.

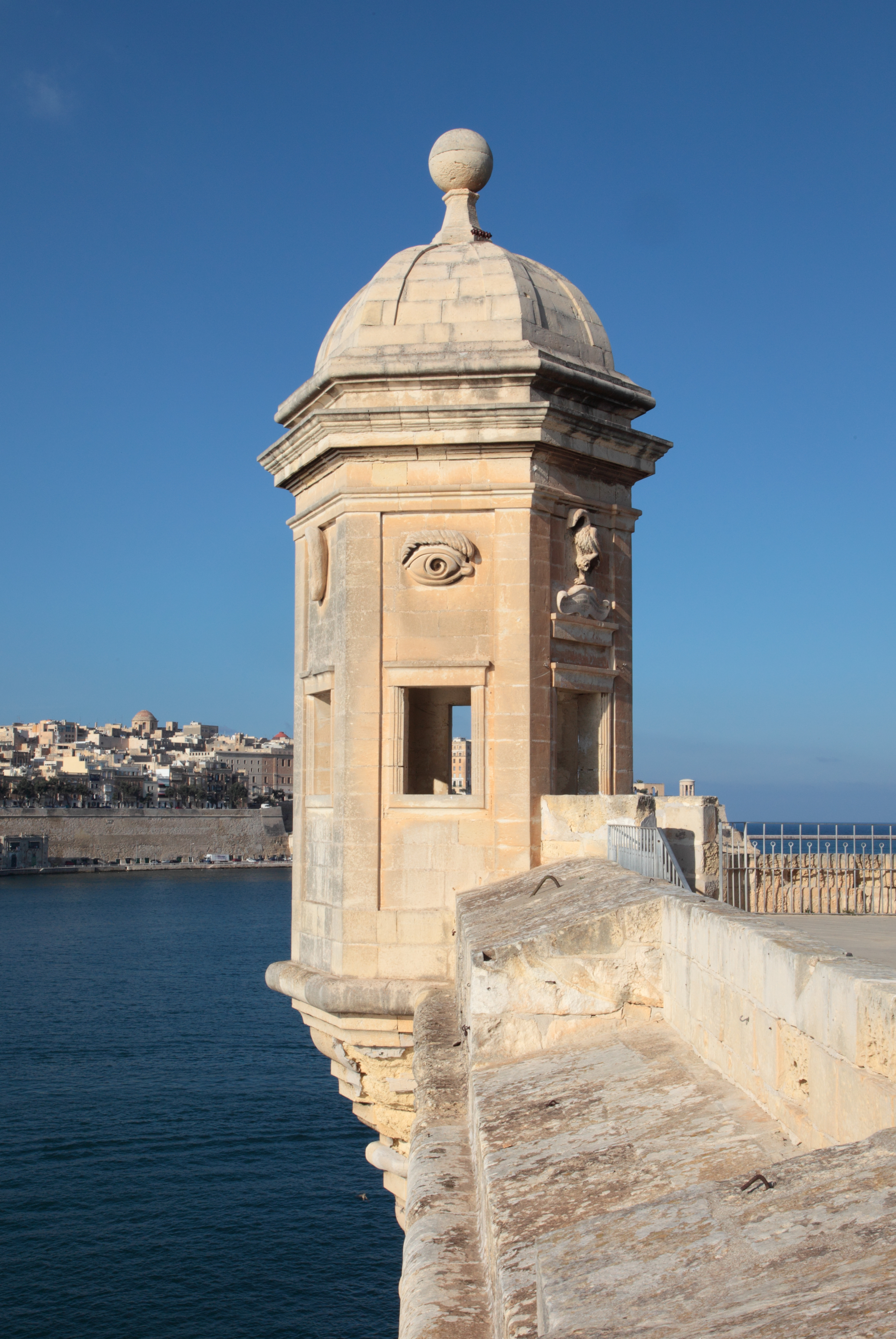
Gardjola Tower at Senglea, built from limestone

Malta has a coarse, hilly environment. There are numerous harbours along the islands' indented coastline. The country's highest point is Ta' Dmejrek, at 253 m (830 ft), near Dingli. Although there are some small bodies of freshwater, Malta has no rivers or lakes. Some watercourses, however, have fresh water running all year round at Baħrija, l-Imtaħleb, and San Martin. There are five types of exposed rock, of which three are types of limestone, one is clay, and one is sand.

=== Environment ===
Malta's climate is Mediterranean (Köppen climate classification Csa). The average temperature is around 19 °C (66 °F), with 23 °C (73 °F) during the day and 15 °C (59 °F) at night. In the coldest month, January, the typical maximum temperature ranges from around 15 °C (59 °F) during the day and minimum 9 °C (48 °F) at night. In the warmest month, August, the typical maximum temperature ranges from around 31 °C (88 °F) during the day and 22 °C (72 °F) at night. In March and December average temperatures are around 17 °C (63 °F) during the day and 11 °C (52 °F) at night. Snow is rare, although it has occurred.

The annual average relative humidity is high, averaging 75 percent and ranging from 65 percent in July to 80 percent in December. Hours of sunshine duration total around 3,000 per year, from an average 5.2 hours of sunshine per day in December to an average above 12 hours in July.

Over the past century, temperatures in Malta have increased by 1.4 °C (2.5 °F), and the surface temperature of the sea has increased a total of 2 °C (3.6 °F). There has also been rising water and flooding of land and infrastructure. There has been a long-term drying trend, however, with the average annual rainfall being 17 percent lower between 2008 and 2024 than between 1940 and 2024. Malta produces the equivalent of about 4.2 tonnes of carbon dioxide per person, one of the lowest per capita values in Europe.

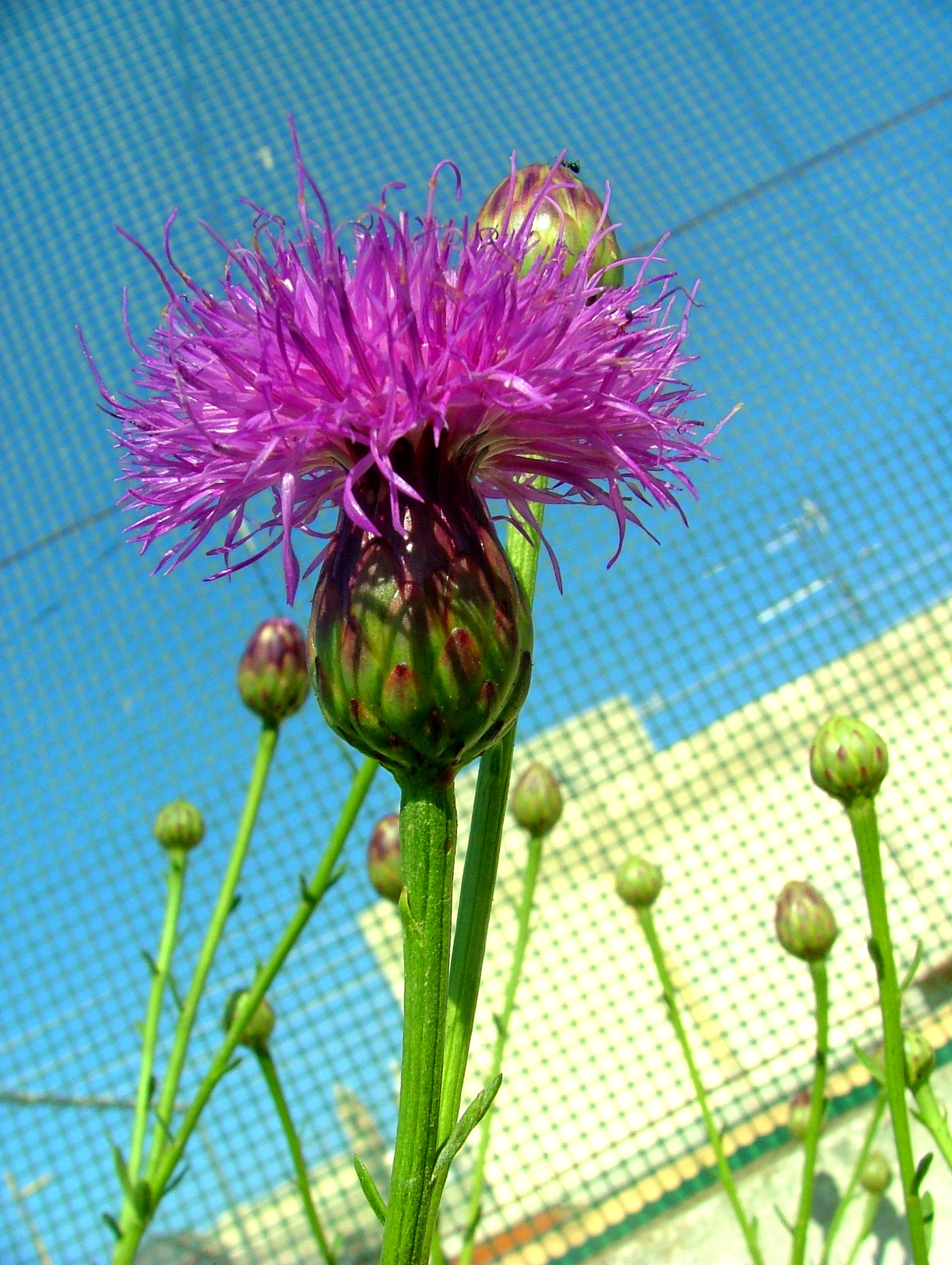
The Maltese centaury (Widnet il‑Baħar), Malta's national plant since 1971

Malta contains 4.6 sq km (1.8 sq mi) of naturally regenerating forest, characterised by mature trees with a height of 2 to 5 m (7 to 16 ft). The overall area occupied by trees is estimated to be 32 sq km (12 sq mi), which constitutes approximately 1.44 percent of the total land area of the archipelago. The most common indigenous tree species are the willow (Salix alba); poplar (Populus alba); olive (Olea europaea); carob (Ceratonia siliqua); oak (Quericus ilex and Quercus rotundifolia); Aleppo pine (Pinus halepensis); laurel (Laurus nobilis); and fig (Ficus carica). The most common introduced trees are eucalyptus, acacia, date palm, and opuntia.

The Maltese islands are also home to a wide diversity of indigenous, sub-endemic, and endemic plants. They feature many traits typical of a Mediterranean climate, such as drought resistance. Endemic plants include the national flower widnet il-baħar (Cheirolophus crassifolius); sempreviva ta' Malta (Helichrysum panormitanum subsp. melitense); żigland t' Għawdex (Hyoseris frutescens); and ġiżi ta' Malta (Matthiola incana subsp. melitensis). Sub-endemic plants include kromb il-baħar (Jacobaea maritima subsp. sicula) and xkattapietra (Micromeria microphylla).

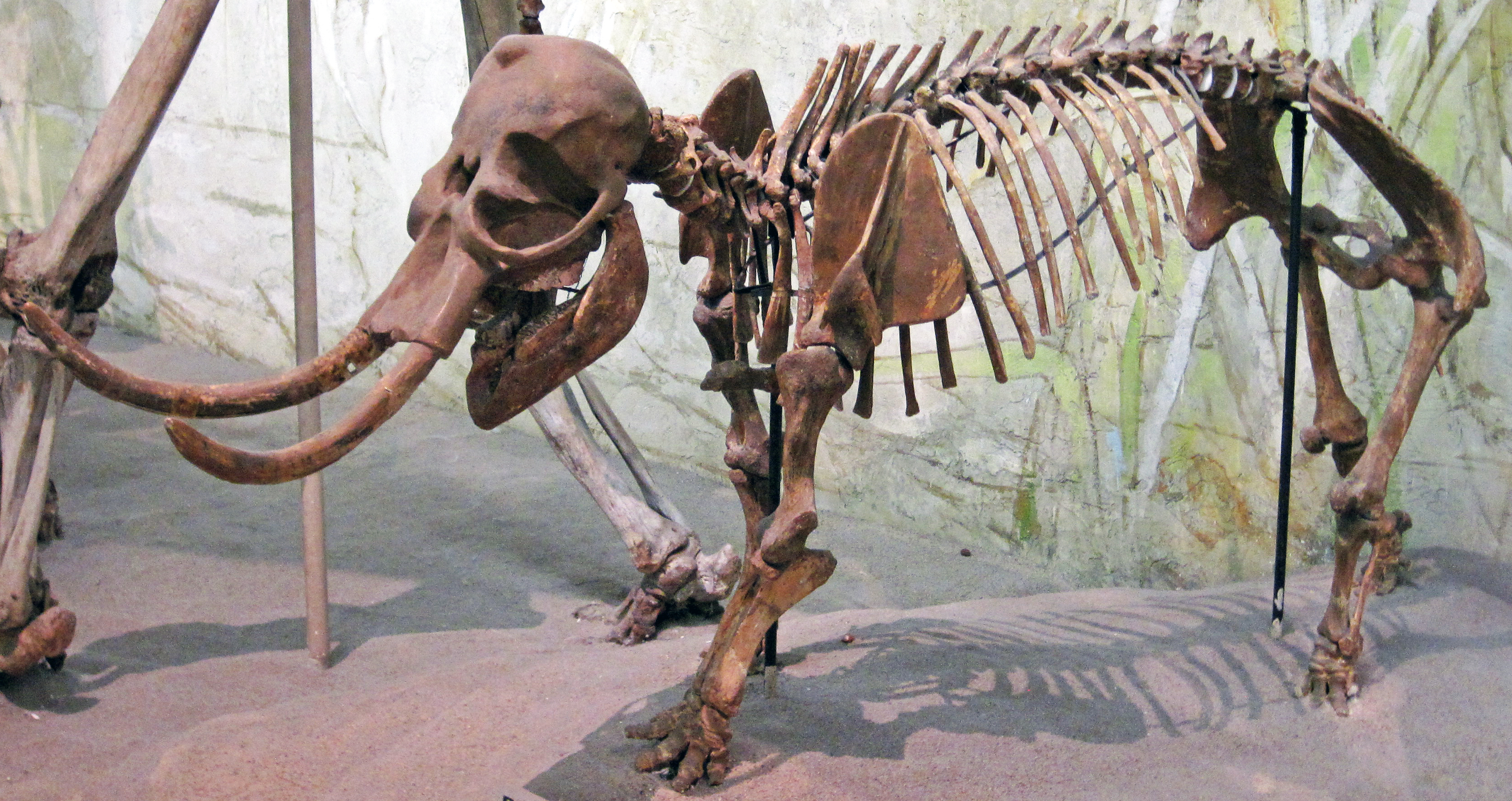
Skeleton of Palaeoloxodon falconeri, a sheep-sized dwarf elephant once native to Malta

Malta also has multiple species of animals. These include the blue rock thrush, which lives on coastal cliffs, the Maltese freshwater crab, the only endemic decapod, and the Maltese honey bee, which inspired the island’s name. During the Pleistocene, Malta was inhabited by dwarf elephants, such as the sheep-sized Palaeoloxodon falconeri/melitensis.

Phytogeographically, Malta belongs to the Liguro-Tyrrhenian province of the Mediterranean region within the Boreal Kingdom. The territory of Malta belongs to the terrestrial ecoregion of Tyrrhenian–Adriatic sclerophyllous and mixed forests. Malta's biodiversity is endangered by habitat loss, invasive species, and human intervention.

=== Urbanisation and cities ===
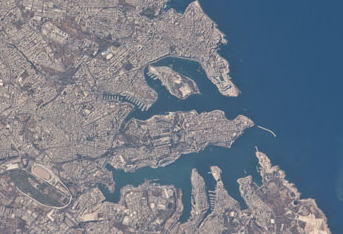
Malta's main urban area, showing Valletta as the central peninsula

According to Eurostat, Malta is composed of two larger urban zones nominally referred to as Valletta (the main island of Malta) and Gozo, with the main urban area covering the entire main island. The core of the urban area, the greater city of Valletta, had a population of 205,768 in 2015. According to Eurostat's data from 2020, the metropolitan region covered the whole island and had a population of 480,134. According to the United Nations in 2017, about 95 percent of Malta's area was urban and growing annually. According to Interreg and the European Commission studies, "the whole territory of Malta constitutes a single urban region". It is sometimes referred to as a city-state, but also sometimes ranked as a city or metropolitan area. With an area of 316 sq km (122 sq mi), it is one of the world's most densely populated countries.

Valetta (Note: Named after Jean Parisot de Valette, leader of the Knights Hospitalier), built after the Ottoman invasion of Malta in 1565, has been Malta's capital since 1570. When the Knights Hospitaller were removed by the French, Maltese revolt led the British to seize it.

Saint Paul's Bay (Note: Named such because it was close to where Saint Paul wrecked his ship) is Malta's most populous council. (Note: With a total of around 30,000 permanent residents and around 60,000 during the summer, though not a city) Remains of beehouses, thermae, and roads show that it was a part of Roman Malta. Later, the Knights Hospitaller built towers and batteries, such as Wignacourt Tower and Arrias Battery, both of which are still standing today.

== Government and politics ==
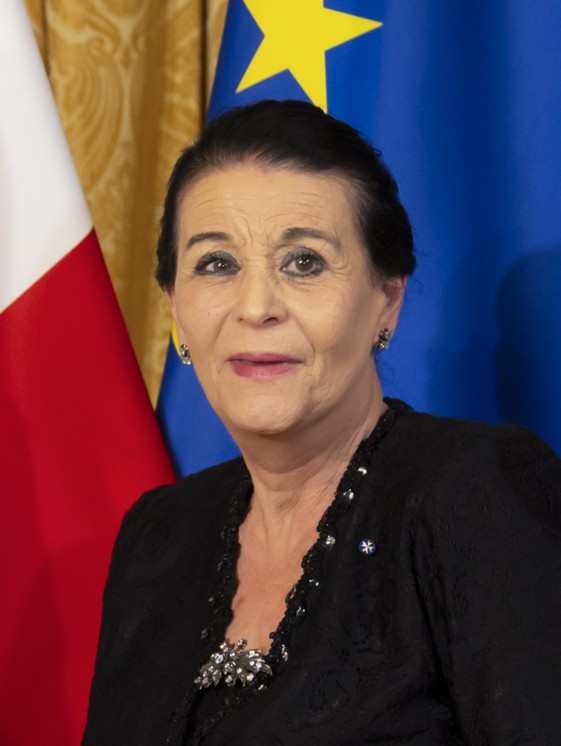
Myriam Spiteri Debono, President of Malta since 4 April 2024

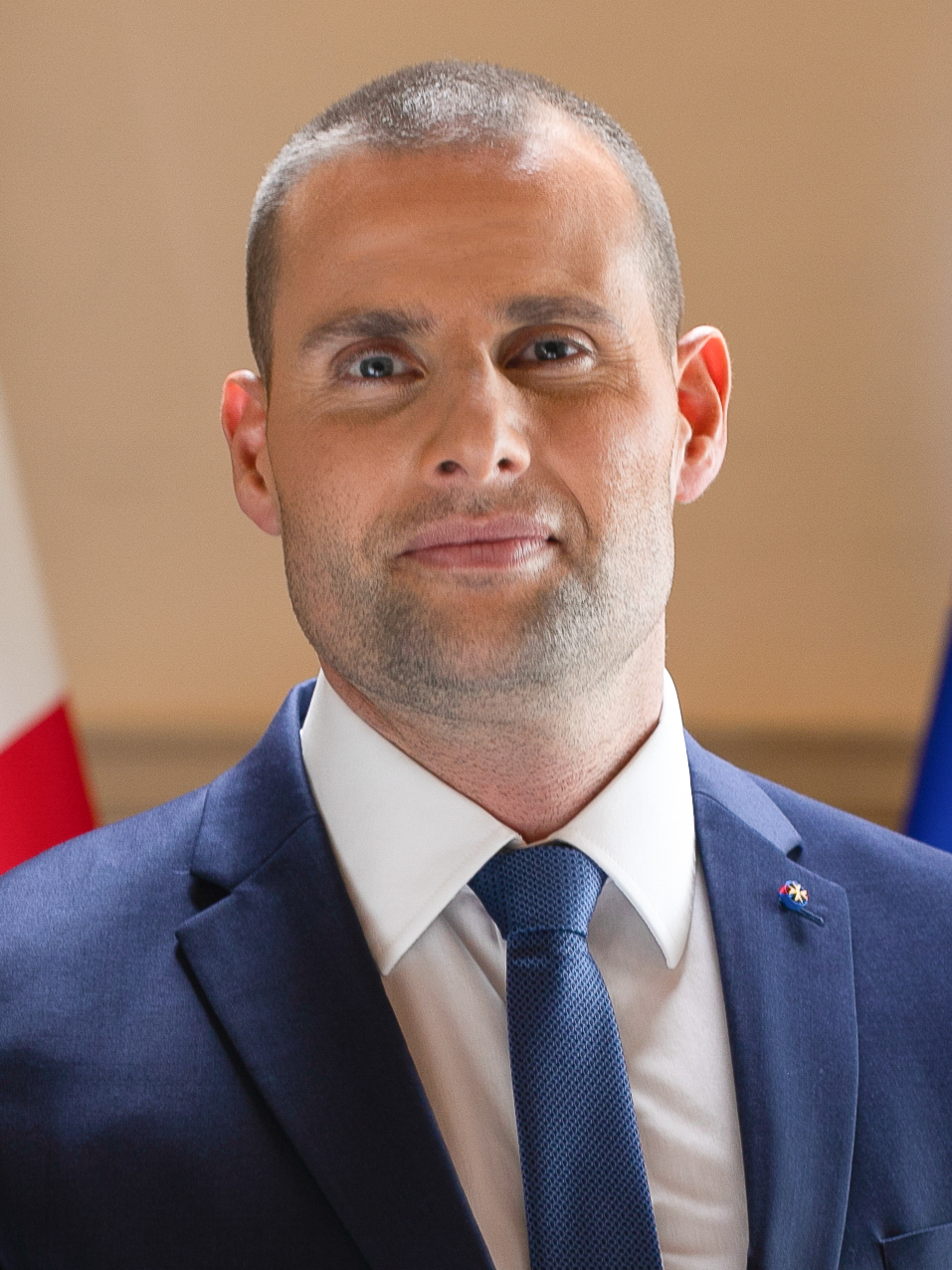
Robert Abela, Prime Minister of Malta since 13 January 2020

Malta is a republic, the parliamentary system and public administration of which are modelled on the Westminster system. The Parliament is made up of the president and the House of Representatives (Maltese: Kamra tad-Deputati). The president is appointed for a five-year term by a simple majority of the House of Representatives. The current president, Myriam Spiteri Debono, was elected on 27 March 2024 by members of Parliament.

The House of Representatives has 65 members, elected for a five-year term in 13 five-seat electoral divisions called distretti elettorali (Maltese: electoral districts), with constitutional amendments that establish proportionality among seats and votes of political parliamentary groups. Members are elected by direct universal suffrage through single transferable vote every five years, unless the House is dissolved earlier by the president either on the prime minister's advice or through a motion of no confidence. Based on election turnout in national lower-House elections from 1960 to 1995, Malta had the world's second-highest voter turnout and the highest for nations without mandatory voting.

Maltese politics has been a two-party system dominated by the Labour Party (Maltese: Partit Laburista), a centre-left social democratic party, and the Nationalist Party (Maltese: Partit Nazzjonalista), a centre-right Christian democratic party, since 1966. The Labour Party has been the governing party since 2013, led by Prime Minister Robert Abela since 13 January 2020.

According to Transparency International, Malta's earlier clean governance record decreased significantly as of 2013, dropping to 65th place in a report published in February 2025. According to International IDEA's Global State of Democracy Indices (GSoD) and Democracy Tracker, however, Malta is in the mid-to-high range on overall democratic measures, but with weaknesses in corruption and civic engagement.

Malta has a two tier legal system, with a court of first instance and a court of appeal. Courts are divided into superior and inferior courts, with superior courts being presided over by judges, and inferior courts having magistrates.

=== Administrative divisions ===
Administrative divisions of Malta

Malta has had a system of local government since 1993, according to the European Charter of Local Self-Government. The country is divided into six regions, each region having its own council to serve as the intermediate level between local and national government. These regions are divided into local councils, of which there are currently 68.

Each council is composed of five to 13 councillors, depending on the population they represent. A mayor and a deputy mayor are elected from among, and by, the councillors. The executive secretary, who is appointed by the council, is the head. Councillors are elected every four years through the single transferable vote. Due to system reforms, no elections were held before 2012; but since then, elections have been held every two years for an alternating half of the councils.

=== Military ===
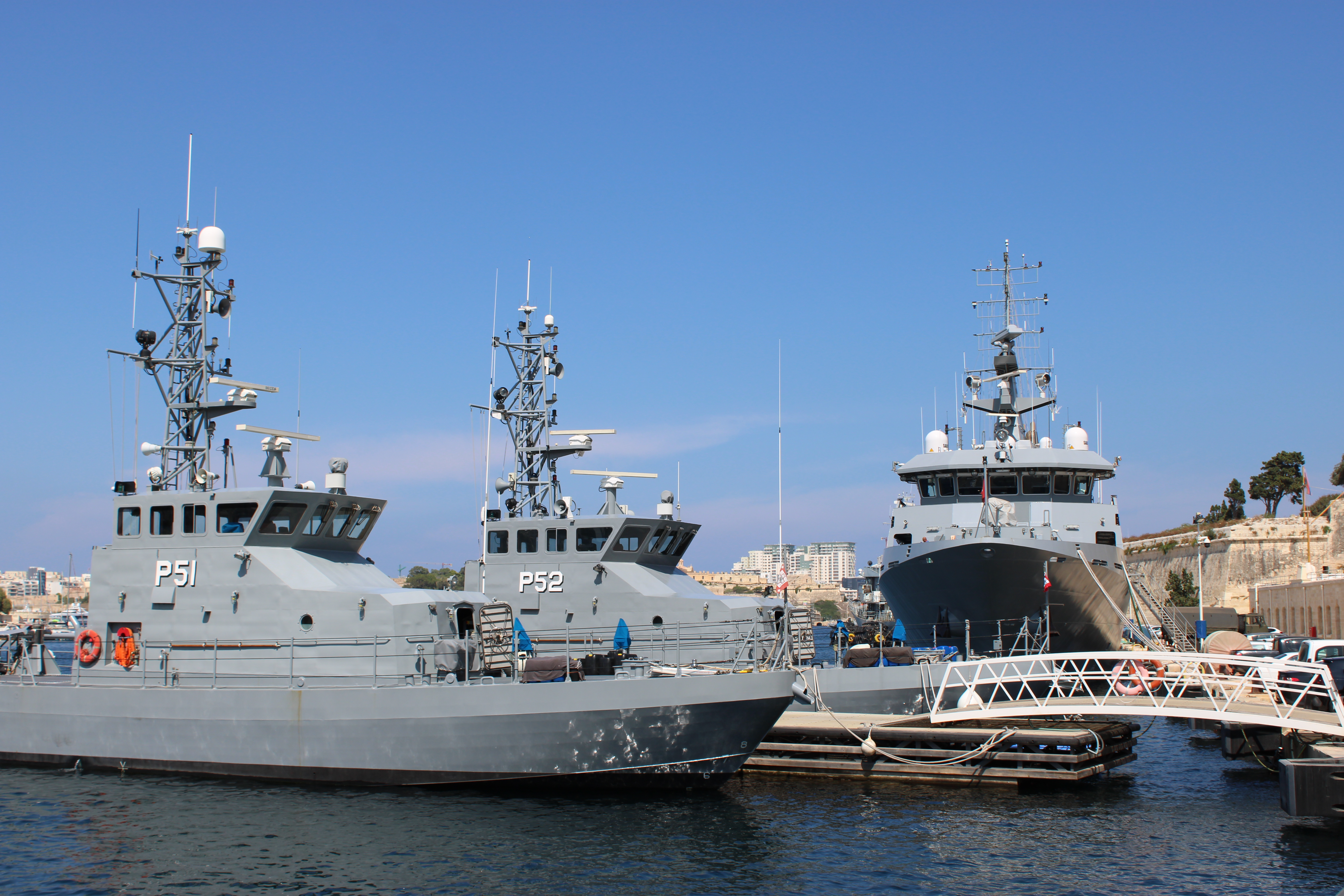
Maltese patrol ship at Hay Wharf, Floriana

The Armed Forces of Malta (AFM) have the stated objectives of maintaining a military organisation to defend Malta's integrity efficiently by emphasising the maintenance of Malta's territorial waters and airspace integrity.

The AFM engage in combatting terrorism; fighting illicit drug trafficking; immigrant operations; anti-illegal fishing operations; surveillance of sensitive locations; and search-and-rescue (SAR) services in an area of around 250,000 sq km (97,000 sq mi) extending from east of Tunisia to west of Crete. In 2020, Malta signed the United Nations Treaty on the Prohibition of Nuclear Weapons.

=== Human rights ===
Malta is regarded as one of the world's most LGBT-supportive countries, and was the first European Union member to prohibit conversion therapy. The country also constitutionally bans discrimination based on disability.

Abortion in Malta is illegal, the only European Union member other than Poland with near-total bans on the procedure. There are no exceptions for rape or incest. On 21 November 2022, the Labour Party-led government proposed a bill that "introduces a new clause into the country's criminal code allowing for the termination of a pregnancy if the mother's life is at risk or if her health is in serious jeopardy", which passed in June 2023 with amendments restricting the exception to situations where the woman's life is at risk.

Amnesty International has criticised Malta for failure to help refugees at sea, detaining refugees, and punitive immigration detention. Malta has not yet established a national human rights organization.

== Economy ==
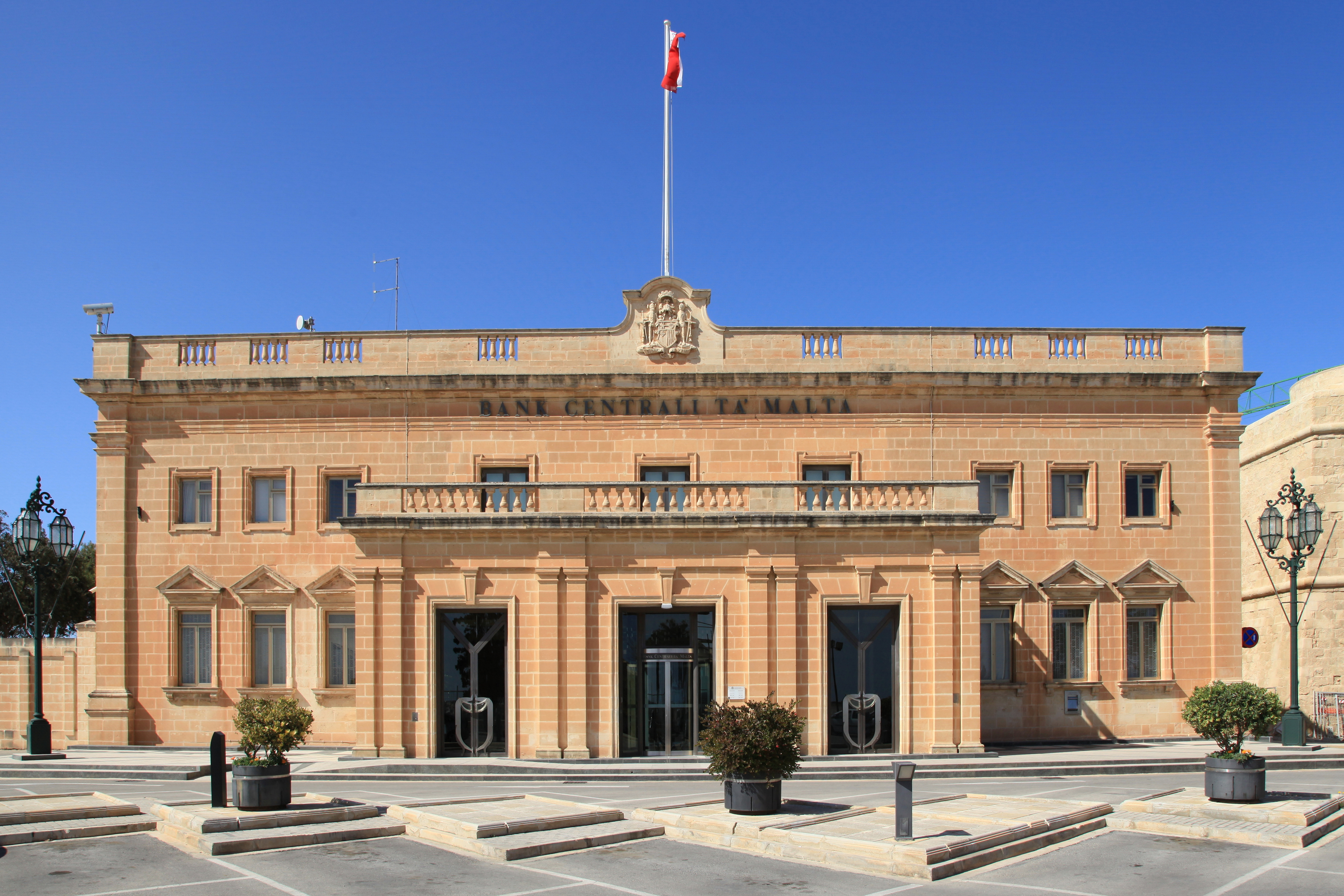
Central Bank of Malta, Pope Pius V Street, Valletta

Malta is classified as an advanced economy by the International Monetary Fund (IMF). It has a large amount of limestone contributing to its economy. Maltese agriculture produces only around 20 percent of its food needs, with limited fresh water supplies in the summer and no domestic energy sources (although there is solar power potential). The economy is dependent on foreign trade, manufacturing (especially electronics and textiles), and tourism. The agriculture is mainly small-scale farms by families who have other jobs.

Film production has also contributed to the Maltese economy. The country's variety of landscapes and destinations has become a significant draw for filmmakers. Films shot on the island include both Gladiator films, Gladiator and Gladiator II, and several episodes of the 1970s British spy drama The Sandbaggers.

Access to biocapacity in Malta is below the world average. In 2024, the country had 0.42 global hectares of biocapacity per capita, contrasted with a global average of 1.6 hectares (4.0 acres) per person. Additionally, residents of Malta have had a sizeable biocapacity deficit.

In preparation for Malta's membership in the EU in 2004, the country privatised some state-controlled firms and liberalised markets. Malta has a financial regulator, the Malta Financial Services Authority (MFSA), with a business development mindset. The country has been successful in attracting gaming businesses, aircraft and ship registration; credit-card issuing banking licences; and fund administration. It has also made headway in implementing EU financial services directives. In 2018, the National Development and Social Fund gave Malta's budget €432 million.

Malta has no property tax, although it still taxes property transactions. Maltese real estate sales totalled over €320 million in May 2025. In 2024, Malta's nominal gross domestic product (GDP) per capita stood at €39,350, which was 9 percent above the EU average.

A 2010 Charities Aid Foundation study found that the Maltese were the world's most generous people, with 83 percent contributing to charity.

=== Currency and finance ===
From 1972 until the introduction of the euro in 2008, the country's currency was the Maltese lira, also called the pound. Before that, a mix of foreign currencies was often used, including British and Italian coins. Malta has produced collectors' coins, which stopped being legal tender in 2010. These coins continued a national practice of minting commemorative coins.

The Maltese government entered the European Exchange Rate Mechanism (ERM II) on 4 May 2005, and adopted the euro as the country's currency on 1 January 2008. Maltese euros feature the Maltese cross on €2 and €1 coins; the coat of arms of Malta on the €0.50, €0.20 and €0.10 coins; and the Mnajdra Temples on the €0.05, €0.02 and €0.01 coins.

Malta's two largest commercial banks are Bank of Valletta and HSBC Bank Malta. Digital banks such as Revolut have also increased in popularity.

=== Tourism ===
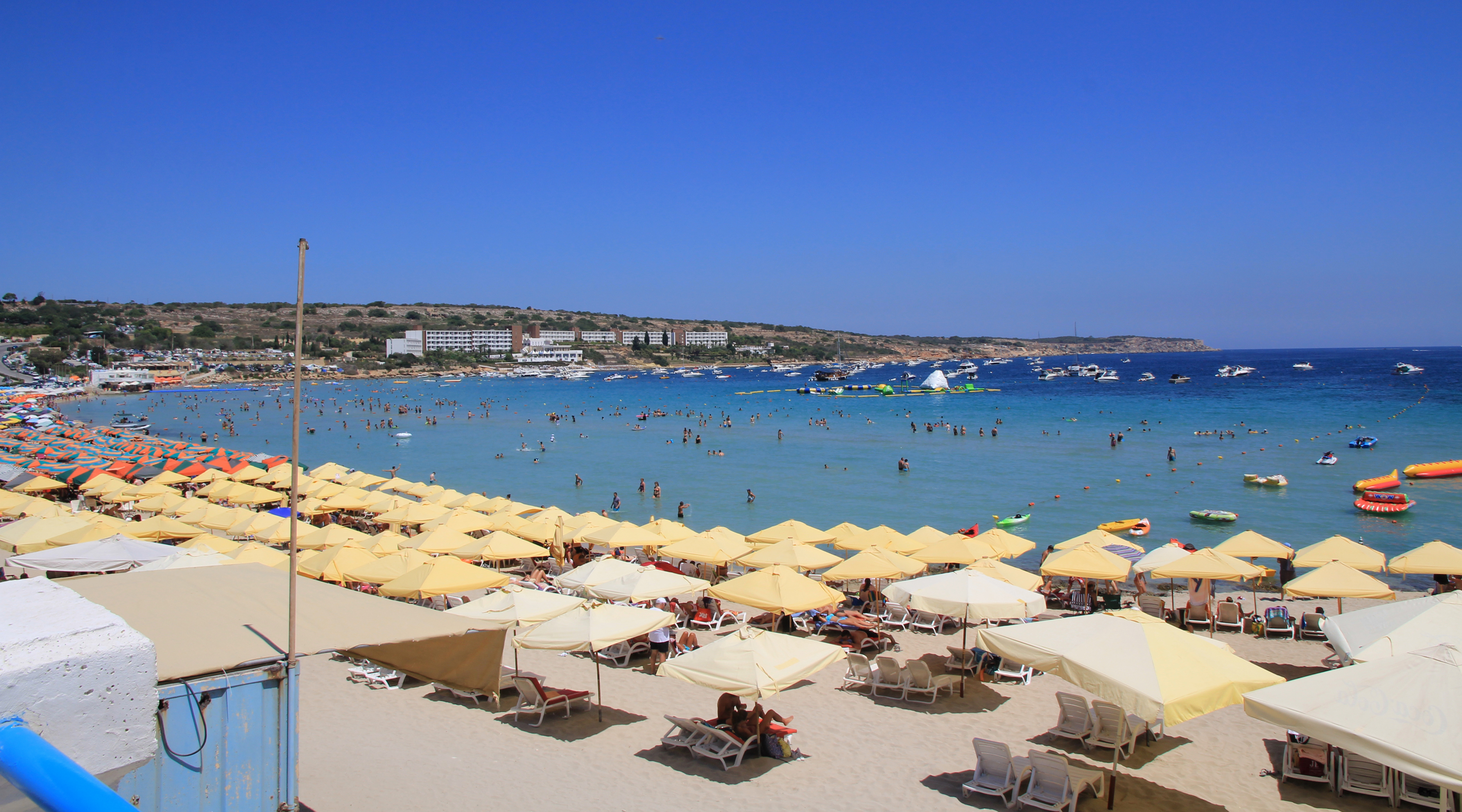
Mellieħa Bay beach

Malta is a popular tourist destination, with 1.6 million tourists per year as of 2015, three times more tourists than residents. In 2017, there were over 2.3 million tourists, mainly from Britain, Italy, Australia, and the United States. Tourism contributes around 11.6 percent of Malta's GDP.

In recent years, Malta has advertised itself as a medical tourism destination, and a number of health tourism providers are developing the industry. However, no Maltese hospital has undergone independent international healthcare accreditation. Malta is popular with British medical tourists in particular.

=== Science and technology ===
Malta signed a co-operation agreement with the European Space Agency (ESA) for more intensive co-operation in its projects. The Malta Council for Science and Technology (MCST) is the civil body responsible for the development of science and technology on an educational and social level. Most science students in Malta graduate from the University of Malta and are represented by S-Cubed (Science Student's Society), the University Engineering Students Association (UESA ), and the ICTSA (University of Malta ICT Students' Association). Malta was ranked 27th among the world's countries in terms of capacity for and success in innovation in the Global Innovation Index in 2025.

=== Transport ===
Malta has a high level of motorisation. According to the National Statistics Office, the number of licensed motor vehicles per 1,000 residents was 778 in 2023. In early 2026, 38 percent of car sales were electric, as the country subsidises low-emissions transport. Malta had 3,096 km (1,924 mi) of road, of which 444 km (276 mi) were classified as of 2021as "other rural unpaved roads". Traffic in Malta is on the left.

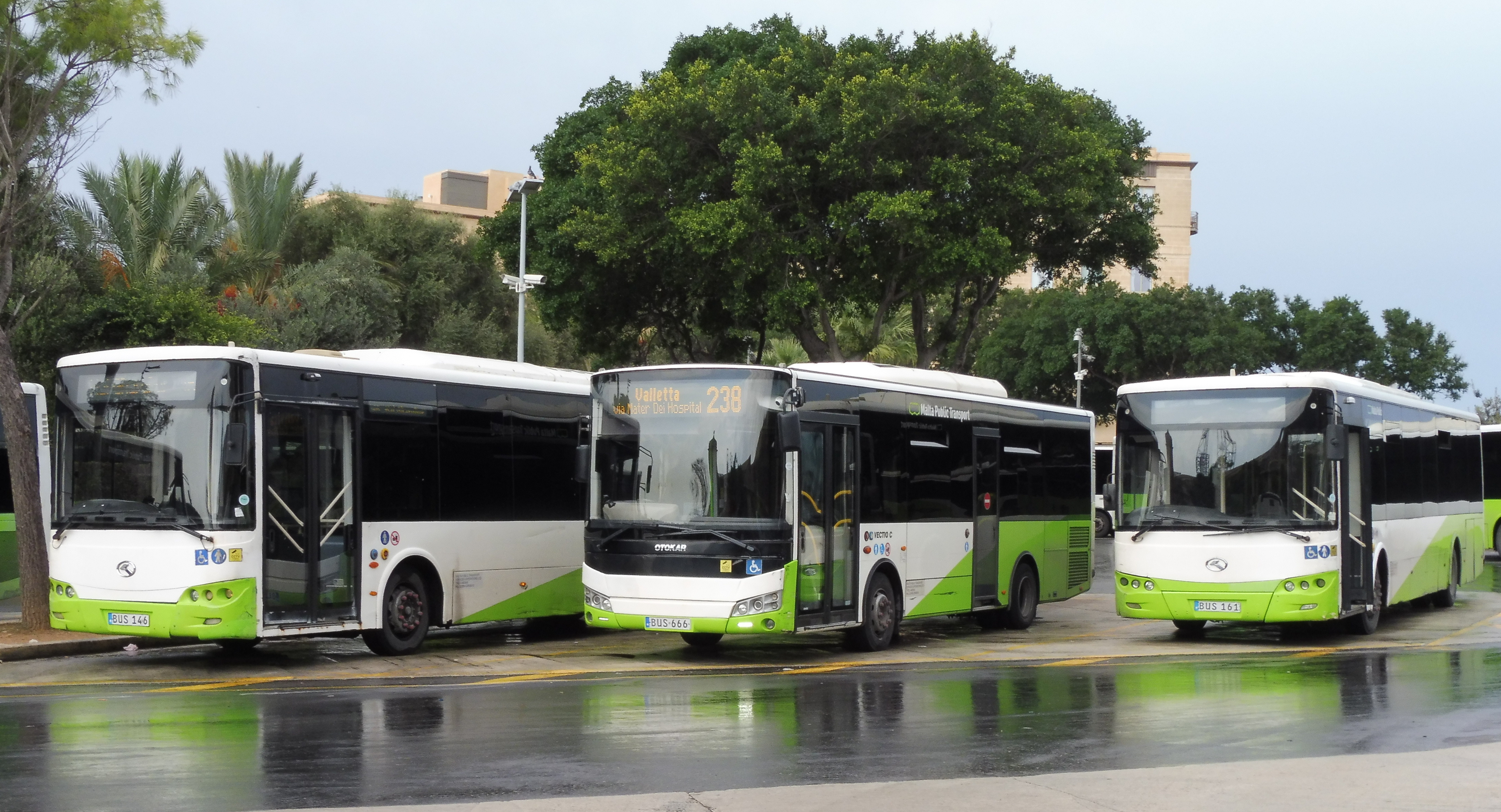
Maltese Otokar and King Long buses

Buses are a common method of public transport in Malta. Its vintage buses operated on the Maltese islands up to 2011, becoming popular tourist attractions. The Maltese bus service underwent extensive reform in July 2011, changing from having self-employed drivers drive their own vehicles to a service offered by a single company through a public tender.

On 1 January 2014, Arriva ceased operations in Malta, having been nationalised as Malta Public Transport. The government then chose Autobuses Urbanos de León (an Alsa subsidiary) as the country's preferred bus operator in October 2014. From October 2022, the bus system has been free of charge for Maltese residents. As of 2021, an underground Malta Metro was being planned, with a projected total cost of €6.2 billion.

Malta International Airport (Ajruport Internazzjonali ta' Malta) is the only airport serving the Maltese islands. It was built on the land formerly occupied by the RAF Luqa air base. There is also a heliport, located on Gozo.

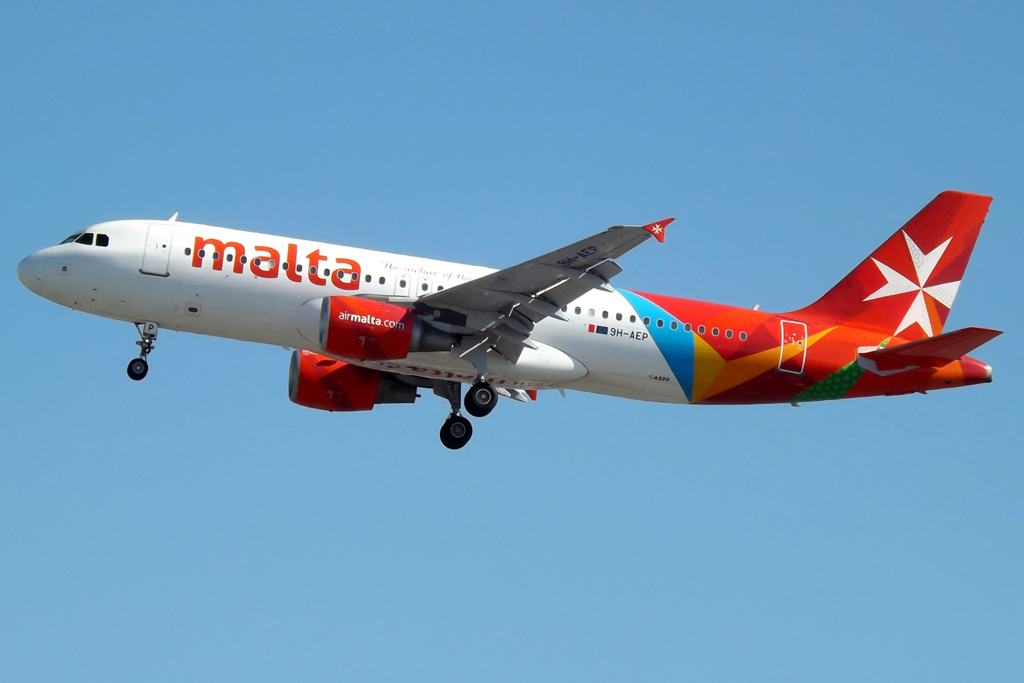
An Air Malta Airbus A320

From 1 April 1974 to 30 March 2024, the national airline was Air Malta, based at Malta International Airport and serving 35 destinations in Europe, the Middle East, and North Africa. On 31 March 2024, however, KM Malta Airlines took over as Malta's national airline.

=== Communications ===
The mobile penetration rate in Malta exceeded 100 percent by the end of 2009, reaching 102.1 percent. Malta's mobile sector has used GSM, UMTS (3G), and LTE (4G) technologies. In early 2012, the government called for a national fibre-to-the-home (FttH) network to be built.

=== Energy ===
Until 1995, Malta relied mainly on coal for electricity generation. In 1992, a new power station was built on the Delimara peninsula in Marsaxlokk. Originally, in 2015, the Delimara Power Station used oil for electricity generation, but converted to liquefied natural gas (LNG) in 2017. The power station also includes two gasoil-fired plants, which are used as standby power generation capacity during emergencies or lack of other power sources. Since 2015, the Malta–Sicily interconnector has allowed Malta to be connected to the European power grid and import a significant share of its electricity. In 2024, Malta consumed 3106 gigawatt hours (GWh), of which 970 GWh were imported through the interconnector.

Of Malta's electricity in 2023, 11 percent was from domestic renewable generation, almost all solar power. There are efforts to boost this renewable generation share to 25 percent by 2030 by building offshore wind farms and increasing battery storage. A waste-to-energy plant that runs off biogas generated by organic waste is planned to contribute further to the electricity grid as a source of net carbon-neutral energy.

== Demographics ==
Self-identified racial origin – 2021 census
Racial origin
Caucasian	89.1%
Asian	5.2%
Arab	1.7%
African	1.5%
Hispanic or Latino	1.3%
More than one racial origin	1.2%

As of the 2025 census, Maltese-born natives make up the majority, numbering 574,348 out of a total population of 588,254. All in all, 89.1 percent are Caucasian; 5.2 percent Asian; 1.7 percent Arabian; 1.5 percent African; 1.3 percent Hispanic; and 1.2 percent a mix between two or more of these ethnicities. The majority of Malta is ethnically Maltese, which is considered as a mix of various ethnicities.

Since 2000, the shift in age towards an older Maltese population continued, with the median age increasing from 38.5 in 2005 to 40.5 in 2011: the result of an increase in people aged 55 and above along with a decrease in the number of people under 25. The average age in Gozo and Comino (41.6 years) was higher than that in Malta. People aged 65 and over more represented 16.3 percent of the total population in 2011, compared to 13.7 percent in 2005. By contrast, people aged 14 and under made up 14.8 percent of the population in 2011, compared to 17.2 percent in 2005.

The Maltese resident population for 2004 was estimated to make up 97.0 percent of the total resident population. All censuses since 1842 have shown a slight excess of females over males. Population growth has slowed from +9.5 percent between the 1985 and 1995 censuses to +6.9 percent between the 1995 and 2005 censuses (a yearly average of +0.7 percent). The birth rate stood at 3860 (a decrease of 21.8 percent from the 1995 census) and the death rate at 3025. Thus, there was a natural population increase of 835 (compared to +888 for 2004, of which over 100 were foreign residents). In 2021, the population of the Maltese Islands stood at 519,562.

The total fertility rate (TFR) as of 2016 was estimated at 1.45 per woman, which is below the replacement rate of 2.1. In 2012, 25.8 percent of births were to unmarried women. Life expectancy was estimated at 83 in 2018.

=== Languages ===
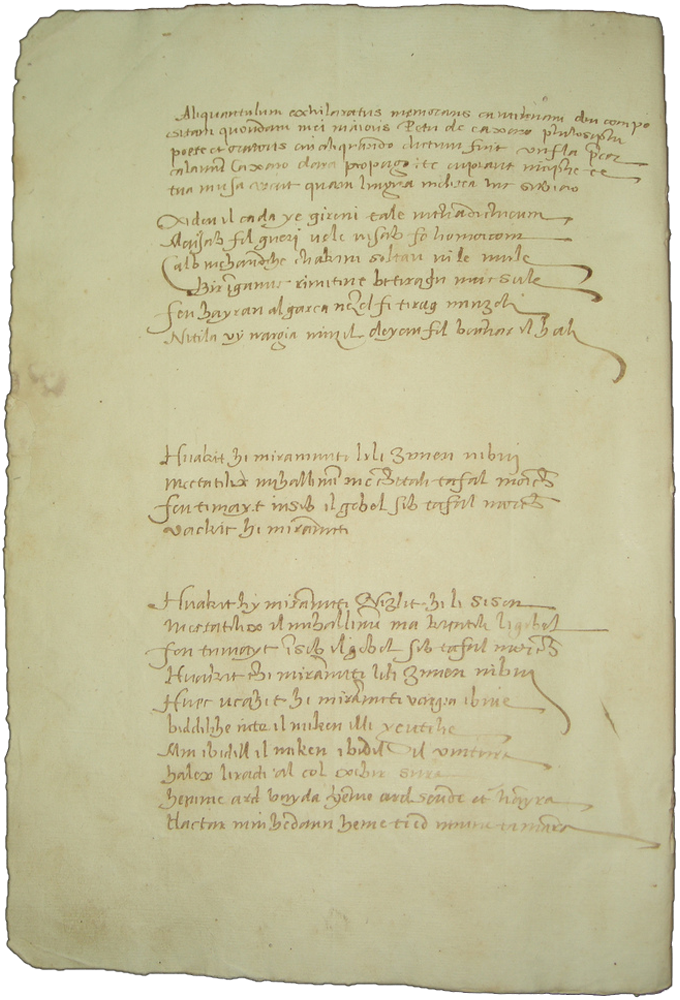
Il-Kantilena by Pietru Caxaro, oldest text in the Maltese language

Maltese (Maltese: Malti) is a Semitic language which holds close ties to both Arabic and Sicilian. The Maltese alphabet consists of 30 letters based on the Latin alphabet. Maltese is one of the two constitutional languages of Malta and is considered the national language. The second official language is English, and hence laws are enacted both in Maltese and English. However, Article 74 of the Constitution states that "if there is any conflict between the Maltese and the English texts of any law, the Maltese text shall prevail." Many speakers of English use a local dialect, Maltese English. Maltese Sign Language is also used in the country.

In 2022, the Malta National Statistics Office stated that 90 percent of the Maltese population had at least a basic knowledge of Maltese, 96 percent of English, 62 percent of Italian, and 20 percent of French. This widespread knowledge of second languages makes Malta one of the EU's most multilingual countries. A study collecting public opinion on what language was "preferred" found that 86 percent of the population preferred Maltese, 12 percent English, and 2 percent Italian. Italian television channels from Italy-based broadcasters, such as Mediaset and RAI, reach Malta and remain popular.

=== Religion ===
Religion in Malta (2021 census)
1. Catholicism (82.6%)
2. Orthodox Christianity (3.60%)
3. Church of England (1.30%)
4. Other Protestantism (1.00%)
5. Islam (3.90%)
6. Hinduism (1.40%)
7. Buddhism (0.50%)
8. Judaism (0.30%)
9. Other religious groups (0.04%)
10. No religion (5.10%)

The predominant religion in Malta is Catholicism, established in the second article of the Constitution of Malta as the state religion, and it is also reflected in various elements of Maltese culture, although there are entrenched provisions for the freedom of religion.

In a survey by Malta Today, the overwhelming majority of the Maltese population adheres to Christianity (95.2 percent), with Catholicism the main denomination at 93.9 percent. 4.5 percent of the population declared themselves either atheist or agnostic, one of Europe's lowest figures. According to a Eurobarometer survey in 2019, 83 percent of the population identified as Catholic.

There is a considerable minority of Orthodox Christians in Malta: 16,457, as of the 2021 census. The Jewish population of Malta reached its peak in the Middle Ages under Norman rule. In 1479, Malta and Sicily came under Aragonese rule, the Alhambra Decree of 1492 forced all Jews to leave the country. Today, there are two Jewish congregations. The 2021 census recorded 17,454 Muslims, of which 1,746 were Maltese citizens. Zen Buddhism and the Baháʼí Faith claim some 40 members.

The number of atheists doubled from 2014 to 2018. The 2015 edition of the annual Freedom of Thought Report from the International Humanist and Ethical Union asserted Malta was in the category of "severe discrimination", alongside seven other EU countries. In 2016, following the abolishment of blasphemy law, however, Malta was shifted to the category of "systematic discrimination", the same as most EU countries.

=== Migration ===
Foreign population in Malta
Year	Population	% total
2005	12,112	3.0%
2011	20,289	4.9%
2019	98,918	21.0%
2020	119,261	23.17%

Malta had a significant increase in net migration since the early 21st century, with the foreign-born population increasing nearly eightfold between 2005 and 2020. Most of Malta's foreign community consists of active or retired British nationals and their dependents, centred in Sliema and surrounding suburbs. Other smaller foreign groups include Italians, Libyans, and Serbians, many of whom have assimilated into the Maltese nation.

Since the late 20th century, Malta has become a transit country for migration routes from Africa towards Europe. As a member of the European Union and the Schengen Agreement, Malta is bound by the Dublin Regulation to process all claims for asylum by those asylum seekers entering EU territory for the first time in Malta. However, irregular migrants who land in Malta are subject to a compulsory detention policy, being held in several camps organised by the Armed Forces of Malta, including those near Ħal Far and Ħal Safi. The compulsory detention policy has been denounced by several non-governmental organisations (NGOS), and in July 2010, the European Court of Human Rights found that Malta's detention of migrants was arbitrary, lacking in adequate procedures to challenge detention, and in breach of its obligations under the European Convention on Human Rights. On 8 September 2020, Amnesty International criticised Malta for "illegal tactics" in the Mediterranean, against immigrants who were attempting to cross from North Africa. The reports claimed that the government's approach might have led to avoidable deaths.

In January 2014, Malta started granting citizenship for a €650,000 contribution plus investments, contingent on residence and criminal background checks. This "golden passport" citizenship scheme has been criticised as a fraud. Concerns as to whether the Maltese citizenship scheme is allowing an influx of such individuals into the greater European Union have been raised by both the public as well as the European Council on multiple occasions. On 29 April 2025, the European Court of Justice ruled that Malta may no longer sell citizenship through its "golden passport" scheme.

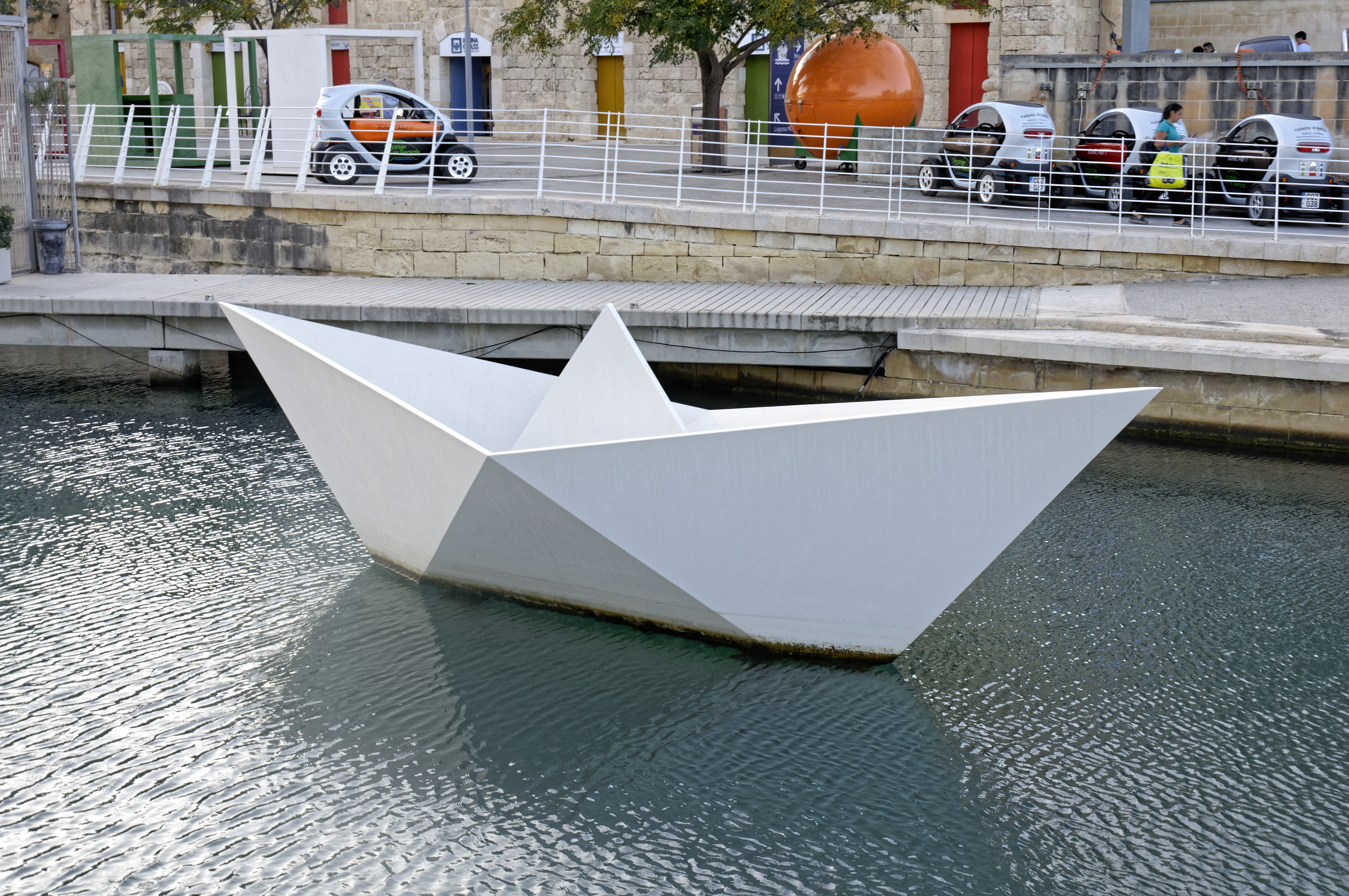
Child Migrants' Memorial at the Valletta Waterfront, commemorating 310 child migrants who travelled to Australia between 1950 and 1965

In the 19th century, most of the emigration from Malta was to North Africa and the Middle East, although rates of return migration to Malta were high. In the 20th century, most emigrants went to destinations in the New World, particularly to Australia, Canada, and the United States. Post World War II, Malta's Emigration Department would assist emigrants with the cost of their travel. Between 1948 and 1967, 30 percent of the population emigrated. Between 1946 and the late 1970s, over 140,000 people left Malta on the assisted passage scheme, with 57.6 percent migrating to Australia, 22 percent to the United Kingdom, 13 percent to Canada, and 7 percent to the United States. As of 2026, around 18,000 people emigrate from Malta each year and around 31,000 people immigrate.

=== Education ===
The University of Malta main entrance, seen in 2026

Malta has a number of private schools, including St. Catherine's High School, Pembroke, which offers an International Foundation Course for students wishing to learn English before entering mainstream education. As of 2008, there were two international schools, Verdala International School and QSI Malta. The state pays a portion of the teachers' salary in Church schools.

Primary school lasts six years in Malta. Pupils sit for O-level examinations at the age of 16, and may opt to continue studies at a sixth form college for two years. Primary to secondary school is mandatory.

Both Maltese and English are used in instruction at the primary and secondary school level, as well as being compulsory subjects. Although public schools tend to use both languages in a balanced manner, private schools prefer to use English in instruction, as do also most of the departments of the University of Malta, a decision that has been criticised for limiting the capacity and development of the Maltese language. Most university courses, however, are in English. The adult literacy rate was 99.5 percent as of 2013.

Of the total number of pupils in Malta who study a first foreign language at the secondary level, 51 percent take Italian whilst 38 percent take French. Other language choices include German, Russian, Spanish, Latin, Chinese, and Arabic. Malta is also a popular destination to study English, attracting over 83,000 students in 2019.

Under the Education Act of 1988, the Government of Malta is obligated to provide free university education to eligible residents with sufficient qualifications for entry. However, due to funding constraints, the University of Malta offers some courses only every other year in order to maximise course offerings with optimum funding usage. 10,000 students currently study at the university. Most Bachelor degree courses run for three years.

=== Health ===
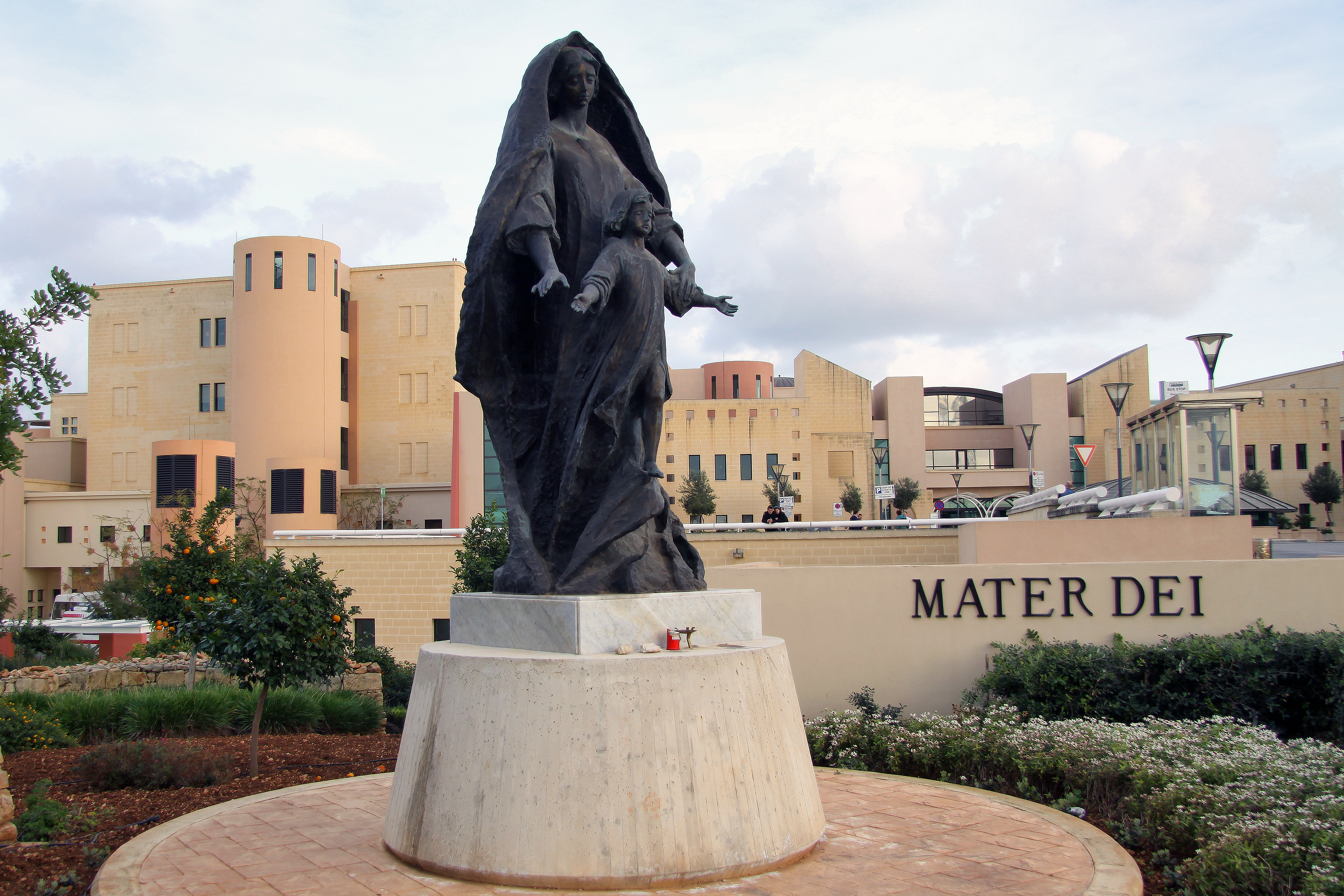
Mater Dei Hospital (Mother of God Hospital)

Malta has both a public healthcare system, which is free, and a private one. There is a strong general practitioner-delivered primary care base, and the public hospitals provide secondary and tertiary care. The Maltese Ministry of Health advises foreign residents to take out private medical insurance.

Mater Dei Hospital, the only acute teaching hospital in Malta, has over 1000 beds and over 4500 workers. It also provides education for the University of Malta.

== Culture ==
=== Festivals and traditions ===
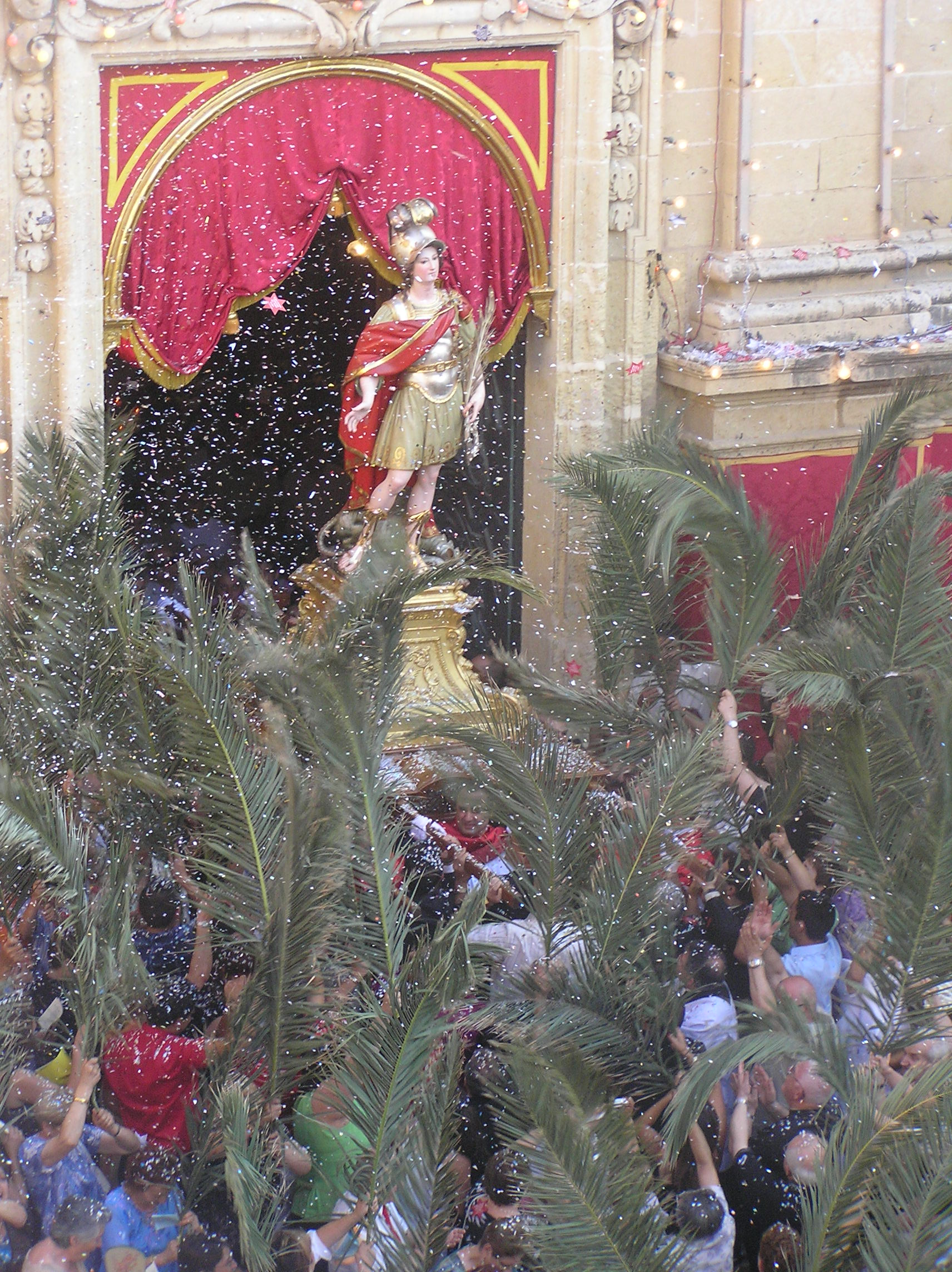
Statue of St. George at the festival of Victoria, Gozo

Local festivals, similar to those in Southern Italy, are commonplace in Malta and Gozo, celebrating weddings, christenings and, most prominently, saints' days. The largest festival is possibly that of the Assumption of Mary, celebrated in eight parishes on 15 August and in two other parishes the following Sunday. Carnival (Maltese: il-karnival ta' Malta) has had an important place on the cultural calendar. Held during the week leading up to Ash Wednesday, it typically includes masked balls; fancy dress and grotesque mask competitions; lavish late-night parties; a colourful ticker-tape parade of allegorical floats presided over by King Carnival (Maltese: ir-Re tal-Karnival); marching bands; and costumed revellers.

Rural Malta shares in common with the larger Mediterranean society a number of superstitions regarding fertility, menstruation, and pregnancy, including avoiding the preparation of certain foods during menses and the avoidance of cemeteries leading up to childbirth. Pregnant women are encouraged to satisfy their food cravings, out of fear that their unborn child would bear a representational birthmark (Maltese: xewqa, literally desire or craving). Maltese and Sicilian folk tradition includes beliefs thought to predict the sex of an unborn child, such as using the moon cycle, the way the baby is carried, or the motion of a ring suspended over the mother's abdomen.

Traditionally, Maltese newborns were baptised as soon as possible. At baptismal feasts, traditional sweets and liqueurs associated with the occasion include biskuttini tal-magħmudija (almond biscuits), torta tal-marmorata (marble cake), and rożolin (a liqueur).

Traditional Maltese weddings include a procession from the bride's home to the parish church, often accompanied by singers beneath a decorated canopy. Historically, Maltese women wore the għonnella, a traditional form of dress.

=== Art ===
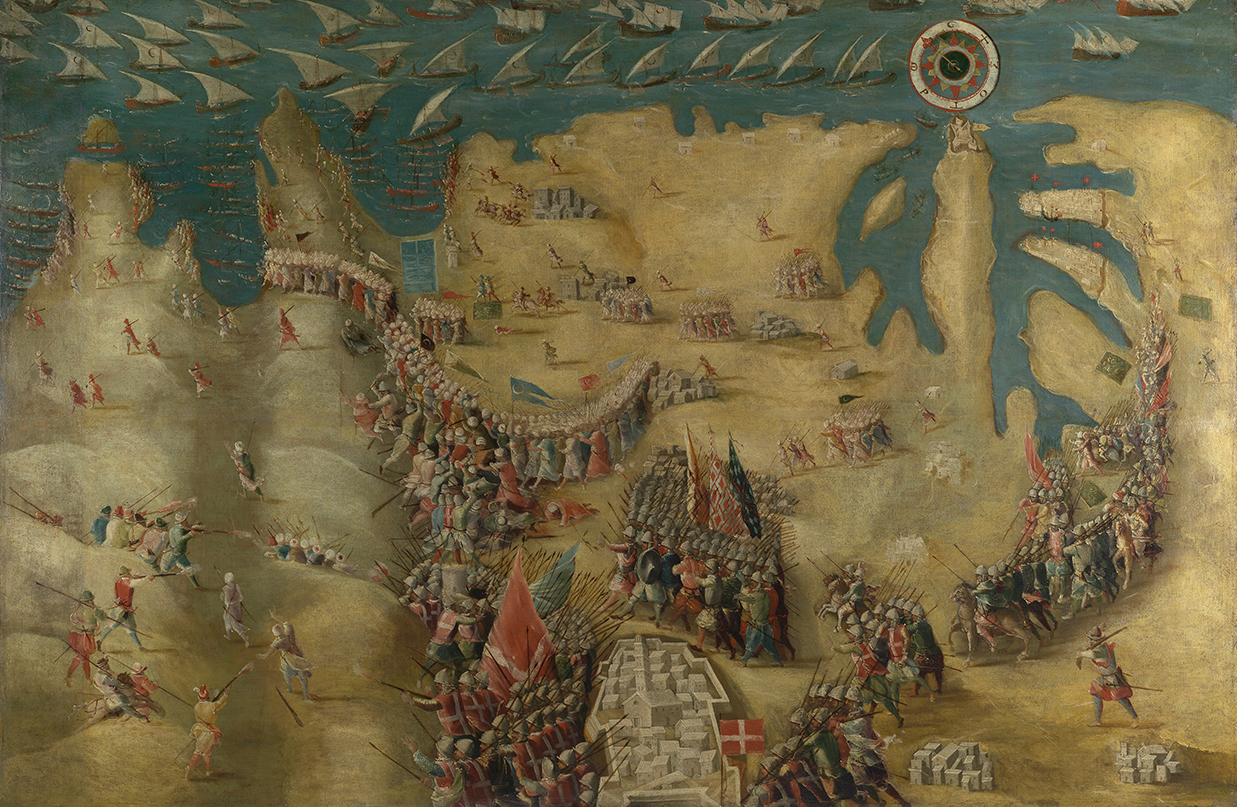
The Siege of Malta –Flight of the Turks, by Matteo Perez d'Aleccio

Near the end of the 15th century, Maltese artists, like their counterparts in Sicily, came under the influence of Antonello da Messina, introducing Renaissance concepts to decorative arts in Malta. Malta's artistic heritage grew under the Knights Hospitaller, who brought Italian and Flemish Mannerist painters to decorate palaces and churches of the islands. For many years, Mannerism continued to influence the tastes and ideals of local Maltese artists.

The arrival in Malta of Caravaggio, who painted at least seven works during his 15-month stay on the islands, further revolutionised local art. Two of Caravaggio's most notable works, The Beheading of Saint John the Baptist and Saint Jerome Writing, are on display in the Conventual Church of St. John. The Baroque movement that followed, however, had the most enduring impact on Maltese art and architecture. The vault paintings of the Calabrese artist Mattia Preti transformed the Conventual Church of St. John into a Baroque style. Melchior Gafà emerged as one of the top Baroque sculptors of the Roman School.

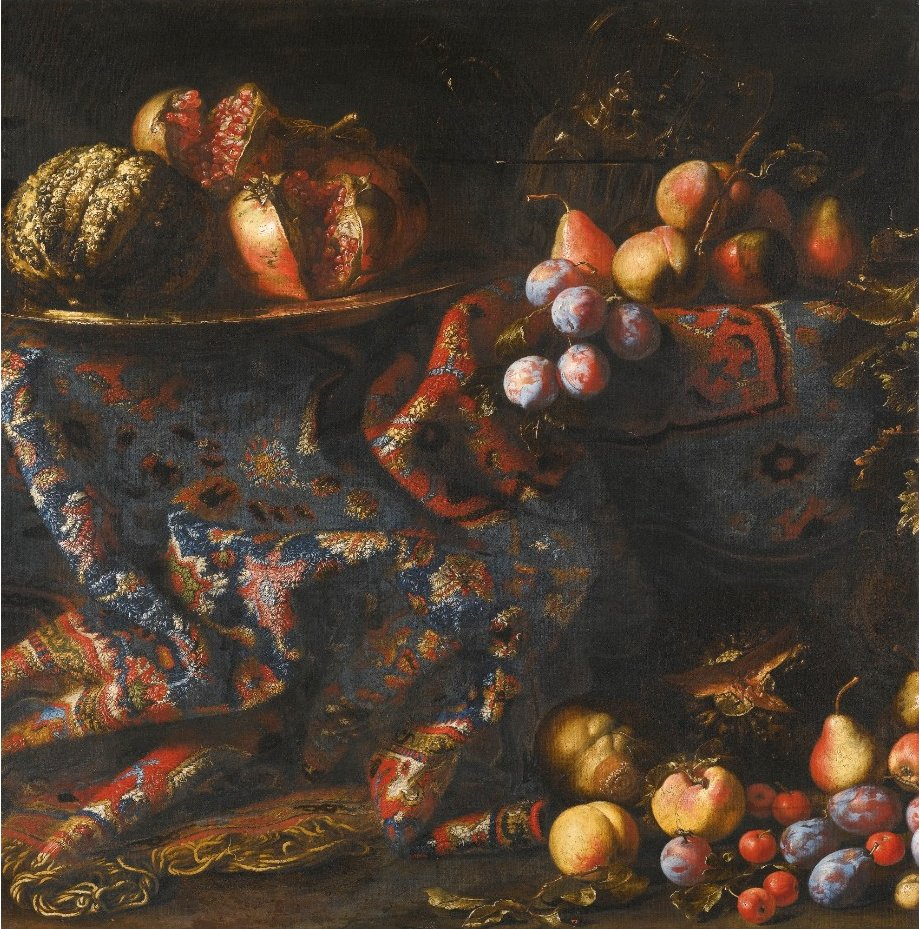
Francesco Noletti's Still Life of Pomegranates, Peaches and other Fruits

During the 17th and 18th centuries, Neapolitan and Rococo influences emerged in the works of Italian painters Luca Giordano and Francesco Solimena, and these developments can be seen in the work of their Maltese contemporaries such as Gio Nicola Buhagiar and Francesco Zahra. The Rococo movement was greatly enhanced by the relocation to Malta of Antoine de Favray, who assumed the position of court painter to Grand Master Pinto in 1744.

Parliament established the National School of Art in the 1920s. During the reconstruction period that followed World War II, the emergence of the "Modern Art Group"—members of which included Josef Kalleya, George Preca, Anton Inglott, Emvin Cremona, Frank Portelli, Antoine Camilleri, Gabriel Caruana, and Esprit Barthet—greatly enhanced the local art scene. This group came together as an influential pressure group known as the Modern Art Group, which played a leading role in the renewal of Maltese art. Most of Malta's modern artists have in fact studied in art institutions in England or on the continent, leading to a diversity of artistic expression that has remained characteristic of contemporary Maltese art. In Valletta, the National Museum of Fine Arts has featured work from artists such as H. Craig Hanna. In 2018 the national collection of fine arts was put on display at the new National Museum of Art referred to by the Maltese acronym of MUŻA, at Auberge d'Italie in Valletta.

=== Music ===
Although Maltese music today is largely Western, traditional Maltese music includes what is known as għana, which sometimes consists of background folk guitar music while a few people, generally men, take turns to argue a point in a sing-song voice. Since 1960, the Malta Song Festival has been organised annually. Traditional instruments include the Żaqq, a bagpipe associated with Christmas.

=== Literature and media ===
Documented Maltese literature is over 200 years old, although a recently discovered love ballet shows activity from medieval times. Malta followed a Romantic literary tradition, culminating in the works of Dun Karm Psaila, Malta's national poet. Later poets like Ruzar Briffa and Karmenu Vassallo, however, tried to distance themselves from formal themes and versification.

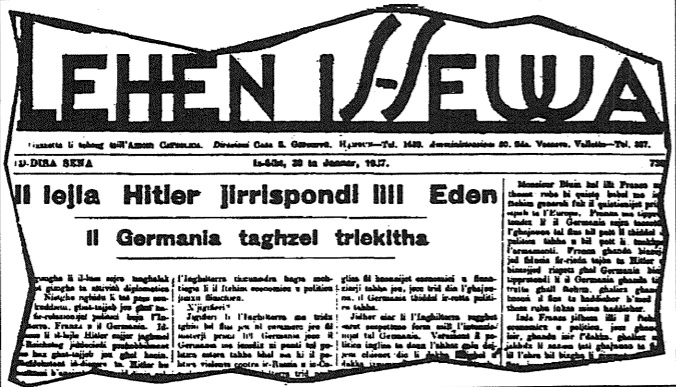
A Maltese newspaper in 1937

Because of bilingualism in Malta, half of its newspapers are published in English and the other half in Maltese. The Sunday newspaper It-Torċa (The Torch), published by a subsidiary of the General Workers' Union, is the widest Maltese-language paper. Its sister paper, L-Orizzont ("The Horizon"), however, is the Maltese daily with largest circulation. There is a high number of daily or weekly newspapers—one for every 28,000 people. Advertising, sales, and subsidies are the three main methods of financing these publications.

Malta has nine terrestrial television channels: TVM, TVMNews+, Parliament TV, One, NET Television, Smash Television, F Living, TVMSport+, and Xejk. The state and political parties subsidise most of the funding of these channels. TVM, TVMNews+, and Parliament TV are operated by Public Broadcasting Services, the national broadcaster, and members of the European Broadcasting Union (EBU). Media.link Communications Ltd., the owner of NET Television, and One Productions Ltd., the owner of One, are affiliated with the Nationalist and Labour parties, respectively. The rest are privately owned.

The Malta Broadcasting Authority has authority to supervise all local broadcasting stations and ensure their compliance with legal and licence obligations as well as preservation of due impartiality.

=== Cuisine ===
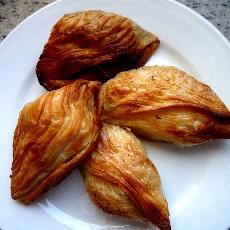
Pastizzi, typical Maltese pastries

Maltese cuisine has been strongly influenced by Sicilian and Italian cuisine, along with food from Africa and Arabia. Food has been historically important in the development of a national identity, in particular the traditional fenkata (the eating of stewed or fried rabbit). Potatoes are also Maltese staples. Maltese restaurants have also earned multiple awards, with Malta having six Michelin starred and 23 Michelin plated cookeries.

A variety of grapes are common in Malta, including Girgentina and Ġellewża. There is a large wine industry, with significant production using these native grapes. A number of wines have achieved Protected Designation of Origin with wines produced from grapes cultivated in Malta and Gozo designated as "DOK" wines (Denominazzjoni ta' l-Oriġini Kontrollata). Although beer is not a popular beverage in Malta, there is a common one called Cisk.

=== Sport ===
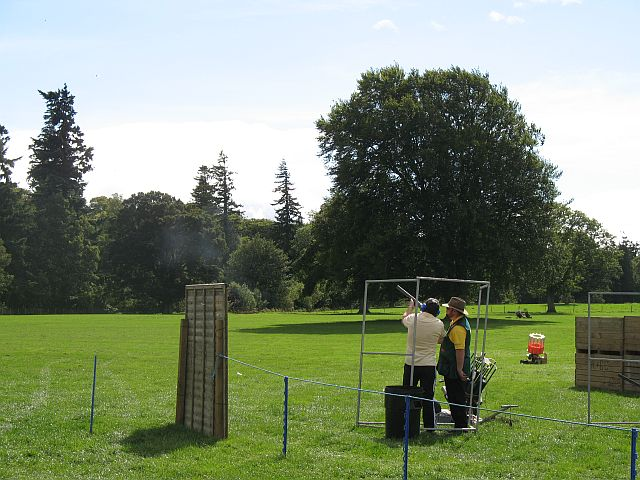
Clay pigeon shooting contest

Football is one of Malta's most popular sports. Other popular sports include boċċi, horse racing, gostra, regatta, water polo, clay pigeon shooting, and motorsports.

Fifty percent of people in Malta follow football. The most popular football team in Malta is Valletta F.C., with 15 percent support.

In 2018, Malta hosted its first Esports tournament, "Supernova CS:GO Malta", a Counter-Strike: Global Offensive tournament, and became the primary location for hosting the ESL Pro League.

== See also ==
- Outline of Malta
- Index of Malta-related articles
