= Banu Matkud =

Hawwara city-state

قلعة بني متكود
- Capital: Misrata
- Largest city: Mazara del Vallo
- Religion: Ibadism; Sunni Islam
- Currency: Tarì
Preceded by	Succeeded by
Aghlabids	Kingdom of Sicily
- Today part of: Libya; Malta sicily

Banu Matkud or Castle of Ibn Matkud (قلعة ابن متكود (Arabic)) was a Hawwara or Laguatan city-state in Misrata from the 9th century to 1128 AD. Its members were hostile to the Berbers. and ruled as a sect of the Mellila tribe holding large portions of Tripolitania with their first chief Umar al matkudi

== Rise ==
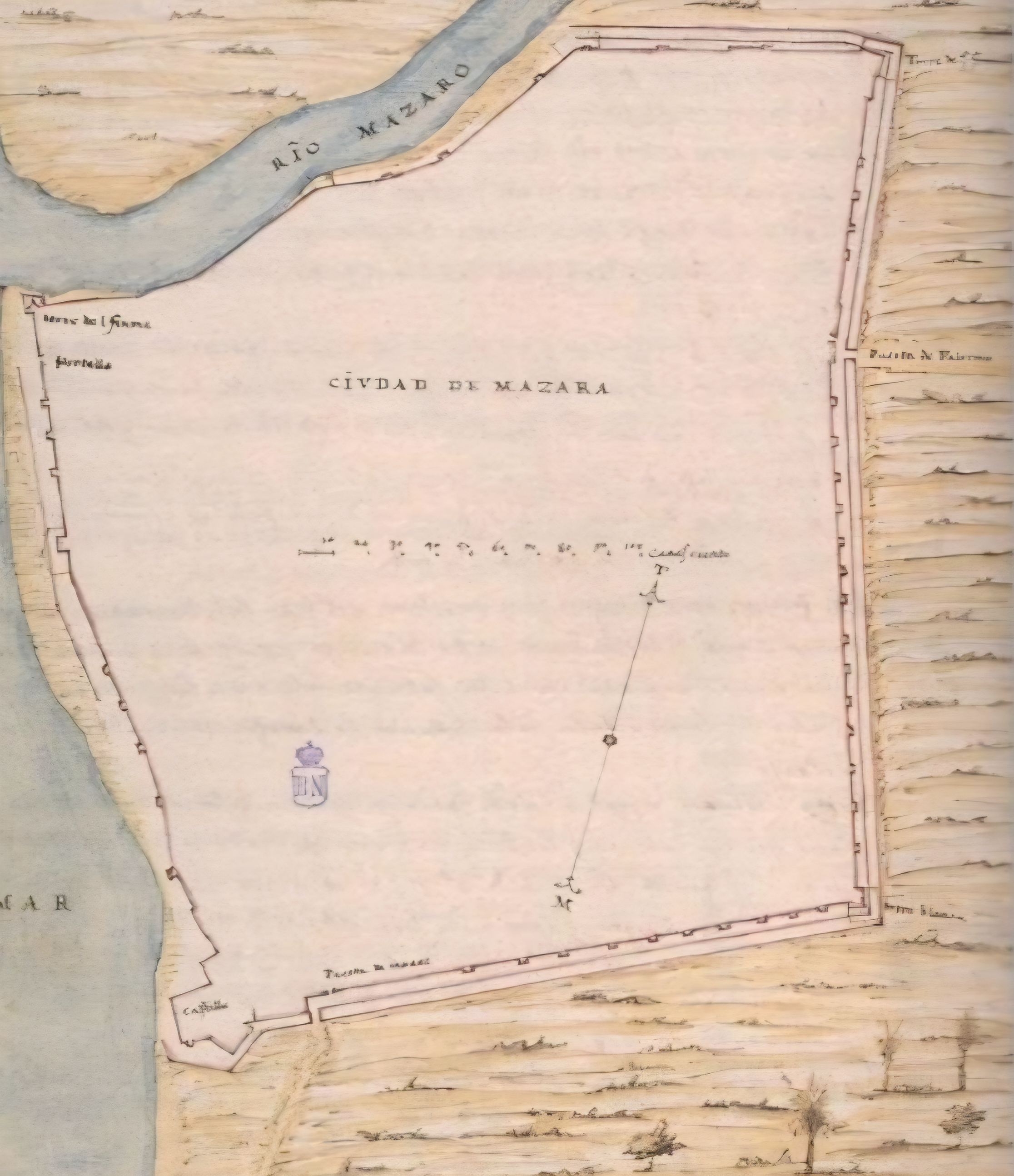
Mazara

Banu Matkud were an Ibadi of Hawwara who were associated Nafusa Mountains a large tribal confedrate and the elite frontier of both the Aghlabid dynasty in the 9th century and the Fatimid Caliphate which granted them the castle of Mazara del Vallo and a autonomous rule, allowed their port city to become an important maritime trade port. while their main trade were mainly to Djerid.

According to the Geographer Ibn Hawqal the rulers would pay Zakat to the Governor of Tripoli. and were documented to establish Library named Dar al kutub in Egypt

== Colonization of Malta ==
During the reconquest of Malta, Banu Matkud along with the Nefzaoua and the Zenata would establish settlements and colonies. They likely became a significant portion of the Maltese demographics.

== Ibn Rashiq's time in Mazara ==
Ibn Rachiq was an Azdi poet and anthropologist who was born in M'Sila and traveled to the modern-day city of Tunis where he studied under Muhammad al-Khushani.

After insulting the Zirids rulers and the Hilalian invasion of Ifriqiya, Ibn Rachiq would flee to Mazara, there seeking the refuge of the general Amari Qaid al-Matkudi, where he would remain until his death in 1071.
