= Schiele =

- Pronunciation: German pronunciation: [ˈʃiːlə]

Origin
- Language: German
- Region of origin: Austria

Other names
- Variant forms: Schiel, Schieler

Schiele may refer to:

- Armand Schiele (born 1967), French Alpine skier
- Bernt Schiele (born 1968), German computer scientist
- Egon Schiele (1890, Tulln an der Donau – 1918, Vienna), Austrian painter
  - Egon Schiele – Exzess und Bestrafung (film)
  - Egon Schiele: Death and the Maiden (film)
  - Egon-Schiele-Museum, Tulln
  - Egon Schiele Art Centrum, Český Krumlov
  - Music for Egon Schiele, the second LP from the instrumental group Rachel's
  - Schiele in Prison, a 1980 British independent film
- Friedrich Michael Schiele (1867, Zeitz – 1913), a Protestant theologian
- Konstanty (Edward) Schiele (1817, Warszawa - 1886)
  - Haberbusch i Schiele, a (now defunct) Warsaw-based brewery holding founded in 1846 by Konstanty and Błażej Haberbusch
- Martin Schiele (1870, Groß Schwarzlosen, Altmark - 1939, Zislow), a German politician (DNVP)
- Michael Schiele (1978, Heidenheim), a German footballer
- Oscar Schiele (1889, Halberstadt – 1950), a German freestyle and backstroke swimmer

== See also ==
- 11338 Schiele (1996 TL9), a main-belt asteroid discovered on 1996 by J. Ticha and M. Tichy
- Camp Bud Schiele, Schiele Scout Reservation in Tryon, North Carolina
- (der Fachverlag) Schiele & Schön, a German publisher, founded on 1946 by Otto Schiele and Willi Schön at Berlin
- Schiel
- Schieler
- Schielo, Germany
