= List of Maltese artists =

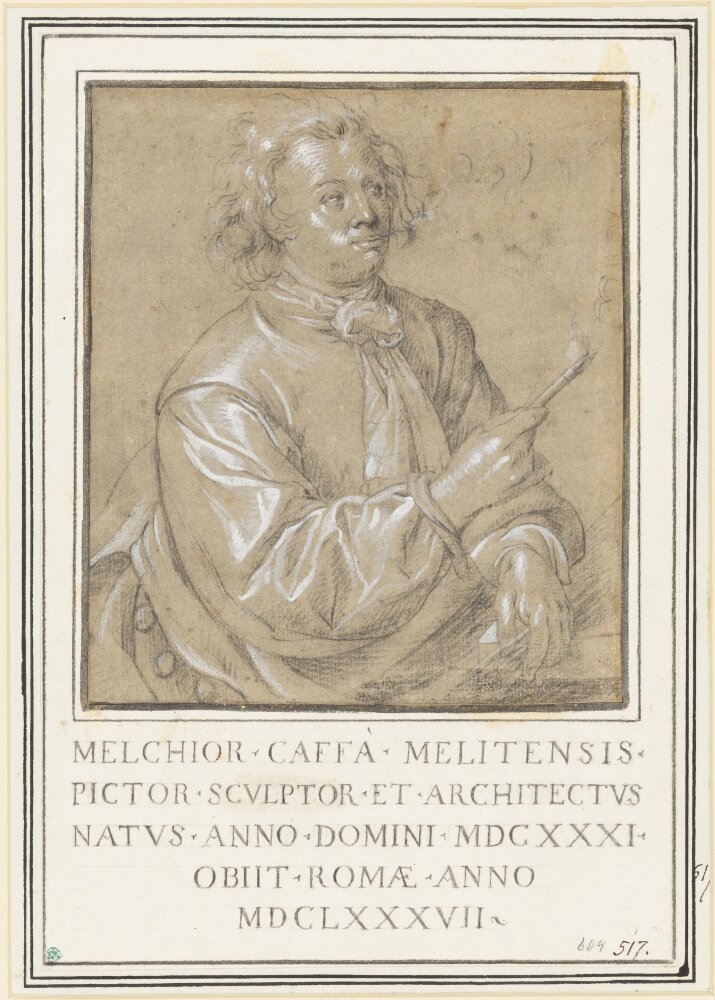
Self-portrait by Melchiorre Cafà (1636–1667)

Various artists have been born or have lived in Malta, including painters, sculptors, designers, ceramicists, architects, art directors, film-makers, photographers, cartoonists, lithographers, and illustrators.

This list includes artists who were either born, lived in, and/or have heritage from the Maltese Islands.

== A ==
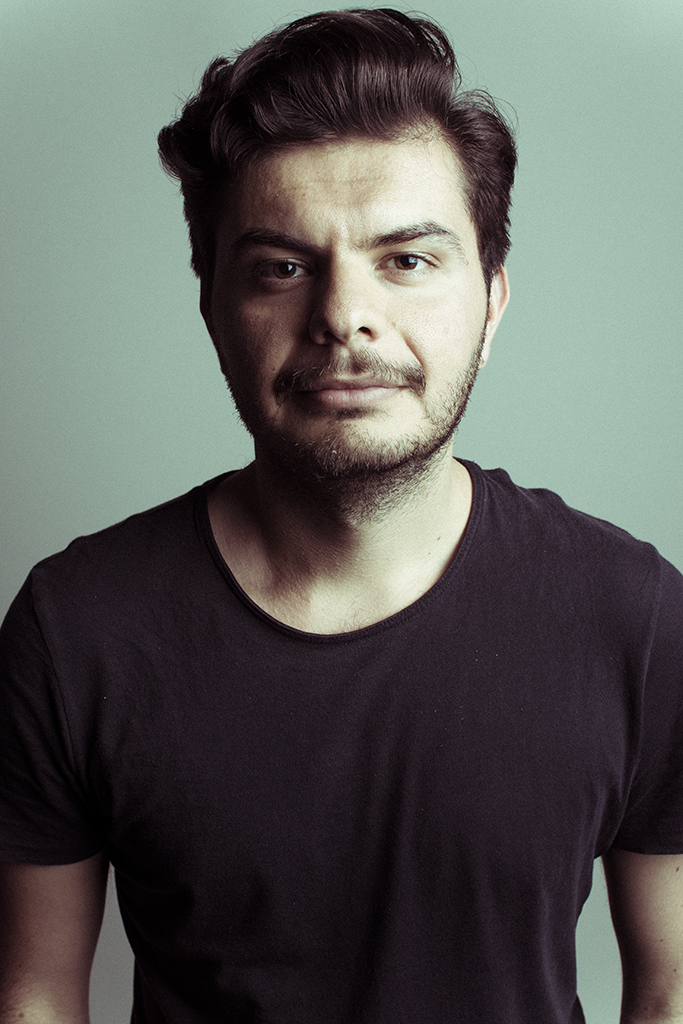
Michael Azzopardi (born 1987)

- Anton Agius (1933–2008), sculptor
- Victor Anastasi (1913–1992), architectural designer
- Julie Apap (1948–2011), ceramicist
- Vincent Apap (1909–2003), sculptor
- William Apap (1918–1970), painter
- Giovanni Attard (c. 1570–1636), architect, stone carver, military engineer
- Norbert Francis Attard (born 1951), architect, sculptor, painter
- Mario Philip Azzopardi (born 1958), television and film director
- Michael Azzopardi (born 1987), digital designer

== B ==
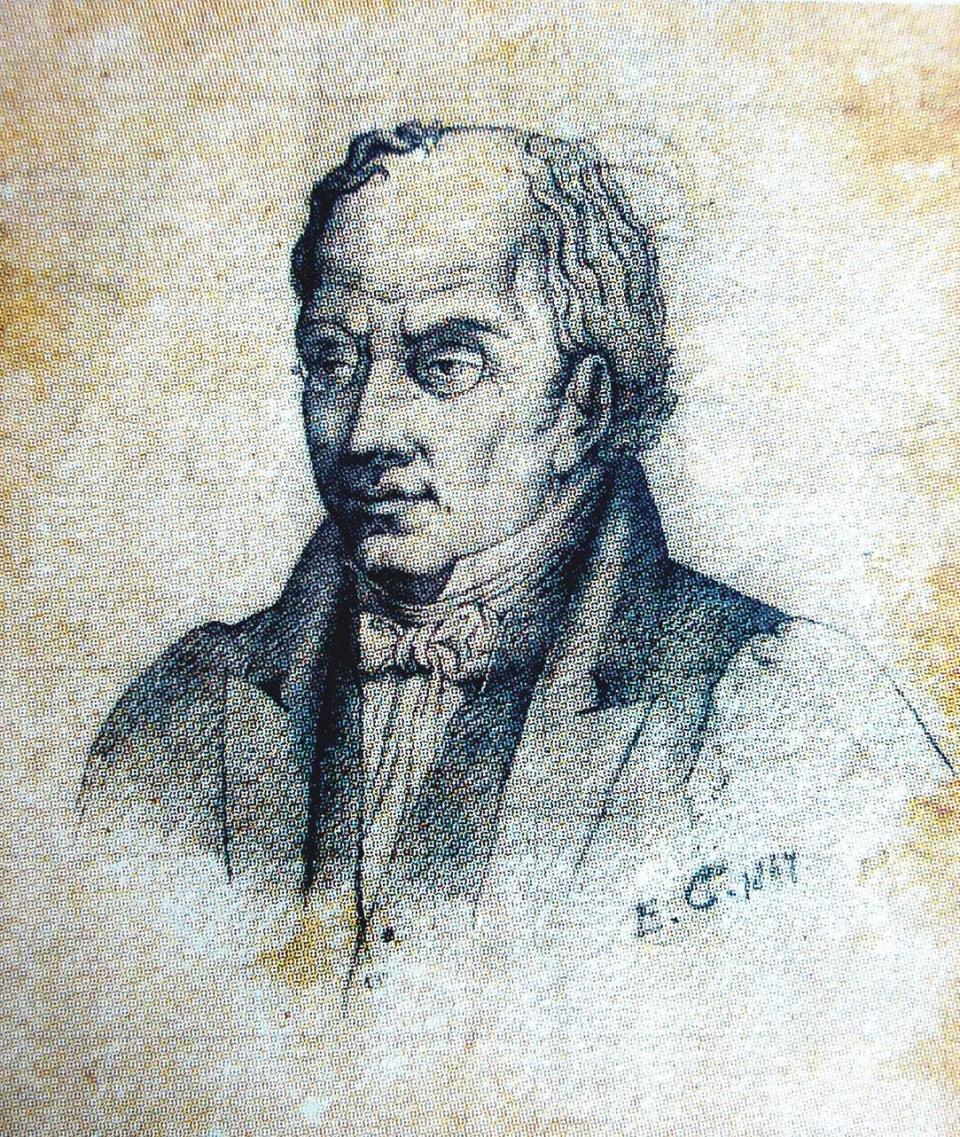
Michele Busuttil (1762–1831)

- Giovanni Barbara (1642–1728), architect
- Isabelle Barratt-Delia (born 1938), architect, civil engineer
- Esprit Barthet (1919–1999), painter
- Andrea Belli (1703–1772), Baroque architect
- Lino Bianco (born 1965), architect, academic
- Giuseppe Bonavia (1821–1885), architect, draughtsman
- Agostino Bonello (born 1949), art director, film producer, production designer, television presenter
- Giuseppe Bonici (1707–1779), Baroque architect
- Ġanni Bonnici (1932–2019), sculptor
- Isabelle Borg (1959–2010), painter, mixed media artist
- Joseph Borg (1942–2016), painter, master printmaker, mixed media artist
- Emmanuel Briffa (1875–1955), theatre decorator
- Tony Briffa (born 1959), ceramicist
- Samuel Bugeja (1920–2004), sculptor, painter, art restorer
- Gio Nicola Buhagiar (1698–1752), painter
- Valerie Buhagiar (born 1963), film director, actress
- Michele Busuttil (1762–1831), painter

== C ==
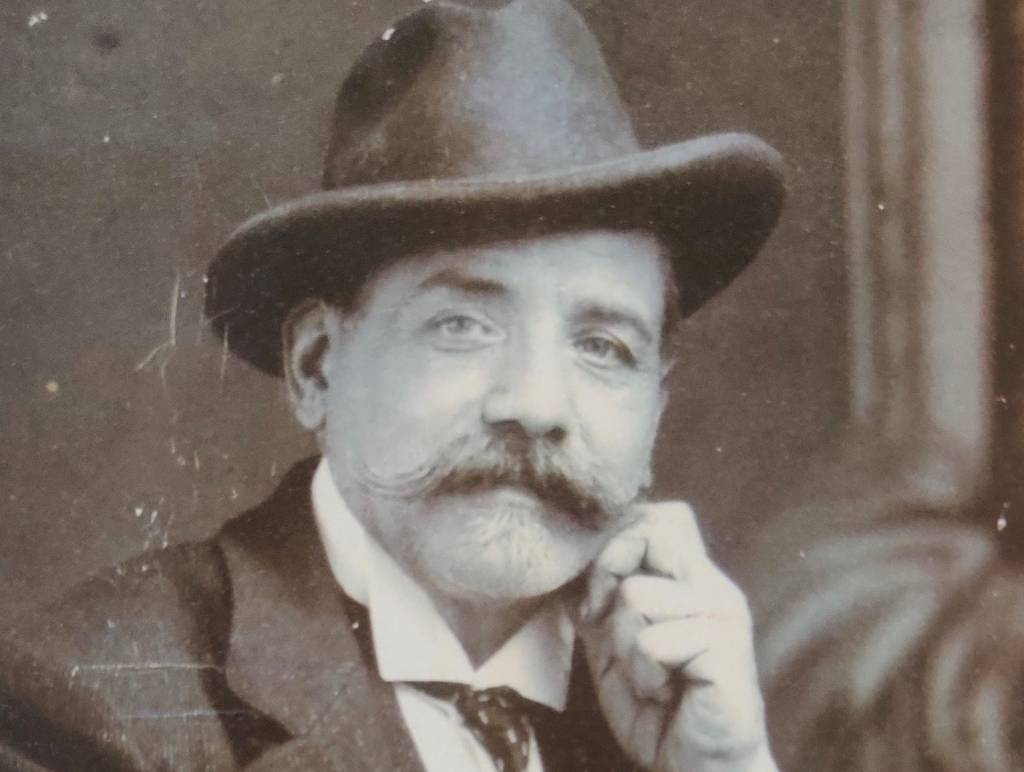
Giuseppe Calì (1846–1930)

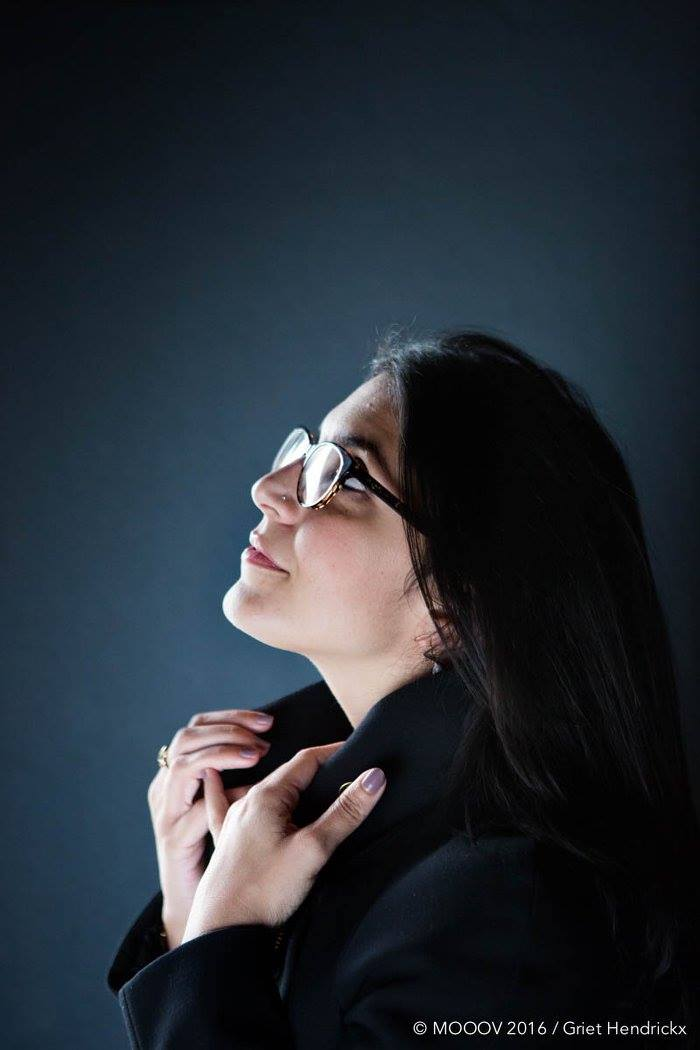
Rebecca Cremona

- Antonio Cachia (1739–1813), architect, civil and military engineer, archaeologist
- Domenico Cachia (c. 1690–1761), architect
- Michele Cachia (1760–1839), architect, military engineer
- Melchiorre Cafà (1636–1667), Baroque sculptor
- Anna Calleja (born 1997), painter
- Giuseppe Calì (1846–1930), painter
- Antoine Camilleri (1922–2005), painter, mixed media artist
- Gabriel Caruana (1929–2018), sculptor, ceramicist
- Joseph Cachia Caruana (1894–1981), architect
- Girolamo Cassar (c. 1520 – c. 1592), architect, military engineer
- Jon Cassar (born 1958), film director, producer
- Vittorio Cassar (c. 1550 – c. 1609), architect, military engineer
- Cesar Castellani (died 1905), architect
- Joseph Chetcuti (1960–2019), sculptor, bronzesmith
- Joseph Colombo (died 1970), architect
- Adelaide Conroy (1839–?), photographer
- Emvin Cremona (1919–1987), painter, stamp designer
- Rebecca Cremona, film director, screenwriter, producer

== D ==
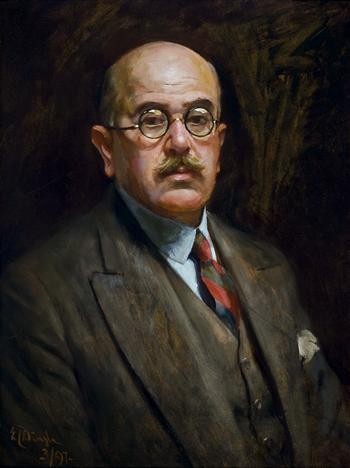
Edward Caruana Dingli (1876–1950)

- Ġużè Damato (1886–1963), Tunisian-born architect
- Maria de Dominici (1645–1703), Baroque painter
- Roger de Giorgio (1922–2016), Italian-born architect
- Charles François de Mondion (1681–1733), French-born Baroque architect
- Mary de Piro (born 1946), painter
- Giorgio Grognet de Vassé (1774–1862), architect, antiquarian
- Vincenzo Dimech (1768–1831), sculptor
- Debbie Caruana Dingli (born 1962), painter
- Edward Caruana Dingli (1876–1950), painter
- Robert Caruana Dingli (1881–1940), painter
- Tommaso Dingli (1591–1666), architect, sculptor

== E ==
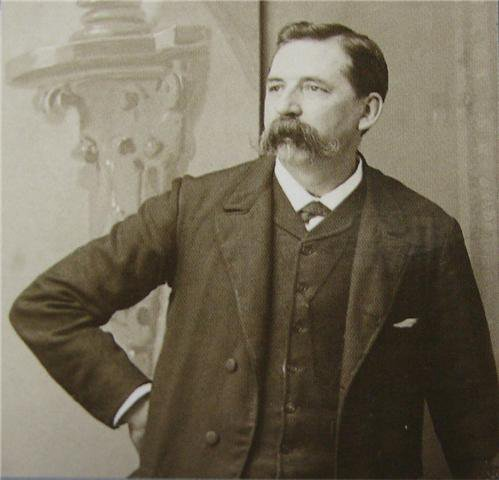
Richard Ellis (1842–1924)

- Damian Ebejer (born 1961), painter
- Richard Ellis (1842–1924), British-born photographer
- Salvatore Ellul (1891–1961), architect
- Richard England (born 1937), architect, writer, academic
- Alessio Erardi (1669–1727), painter
- Pietro Erardi (1644–1727), painter, chaplain
- Stefano Erardi (1630–1716), painter

== F ==
- Antonio Falzon (fl. 1538 – c. 1555), architect
- Michael Falzon (1945–2025), architect, politician
- Edwin England Sant Fournier (1908–1969), architect

== G ==
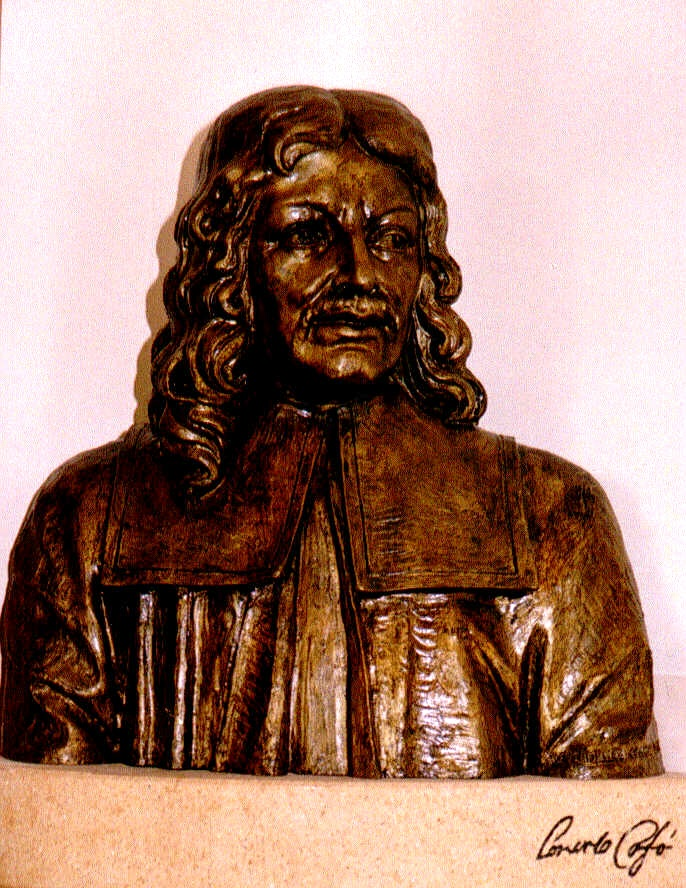
Lorenzo Gafà (1639–1703)

- Lorenzo Gafà (1639–1703), architect, sculptor
- Ċensu Galea (born 1956), architect, politician
- Luigi Maria Galea (1847–1917), marine painter
- Emanuele Luigi Galizia (1830–1907), architect, civil engineer
- Maxim Gauci (1774–1854), lithographer, painter
- Paul Gauci (fl. 1830s – c. 1860s), lithographer
- Mariano Gerada (1766–1823), sculptor
- Carlo Gimach (1651–1730), architect, engineer, poet
- Lino Grech (1930–2013), film director, actor, writer
- Pawlu Grech (1938–2021), painter, music composer
- Andrew Grima (1921–2007), Italian-born jeweller, designer
- Anna Grima (born 1958), painter

== H ==
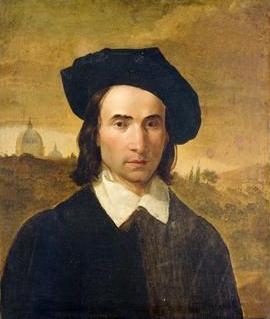
Giuseppe Hyzler (1787–1858)

- Sarah Ann Harrison (1837–?), English-born photographer
- Joseph G. Huntingford (1926–1994), architect, civil engineer, urban planner
- Giuseppe Hyzler (1787–1858), Nazarene painter

== L ==
- Alberto Laferla (1898–1942), architect
- Renato Laferla, architect
- John Busuttil Leaver (born 1964), visual artist, painter
- Norman Lowell (born 1946), abstract painter, fascist politician
- Darrin Zammit Lupi (born 1968), photographer, photojournalist

== M ==
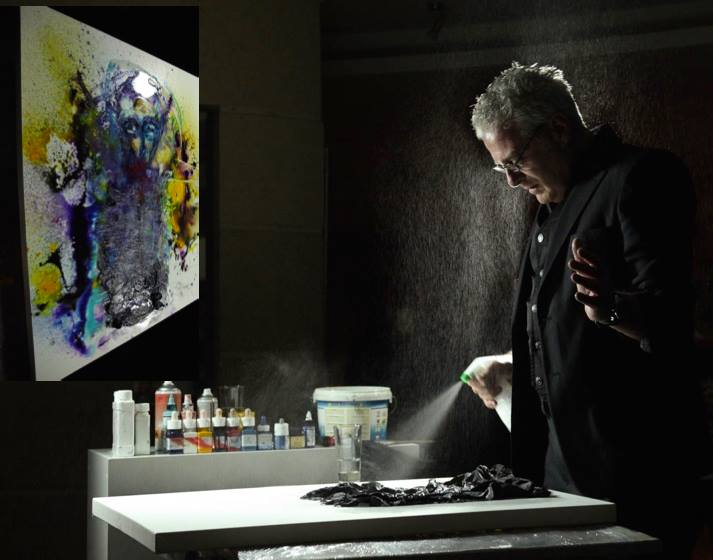
Mark Mallia (1965–2024)

- Ġorġ Mallia (born 1957), cartoonist, illustrator, author
- Mark Mallia (1965–2024), abstract and portrait painter, sculptor
- Audrey Mercieca (born 1974), painter, sculptor
- Silvio Mercieca (1888–1954), architect
- Andrew Micallef (born 1969), painter, illustrator, musician
- Luciano Micallef (born 1954), abstract painter
- Pauleen Micallef (born 1951), painter
- Kris Micallef (born 1988), photographer
- Philip Mifsud (born 1971), architect, politician
- Dominic Mintoff (1916–2012), architect, civil engineer, politician

== N ==
- Francesco Noletti (1611–1654), Baroque still-life, tapestry painter

== P ==
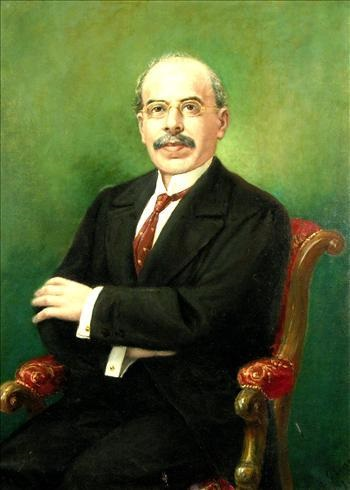
Lazzaro Pisani (1854–1932)

- Webster Paulson (1837–1887), English-born architect, civil engineer
- Keith Piper (born 1960), Black British painter, curator
- Carmelo Borg Pisani (1915–1942), painter, fascist spy
- Lazzaro Pisani (1854–1932), painter
- Ray Piscopo (born 1954), engineer, visual artist
- Frank Portelli (1922–2004), mural painter
- Joanne Fenech Portelli (born 1976), painter, sculptor
- Pierre Portelli (born 1961), visual artist
- Amedeo Preziosi (1816–1882), painter
- Giuseppe Psaila (1891–1960), architect
- Salvatore Psaila (1798–1871), sculptor
- Alberto Pullicino (1719–1759), painter
- George Pullicino (born 1964), architect, politician
- Giorgio Pullicino (1779–1851), painter, architect

== S ==
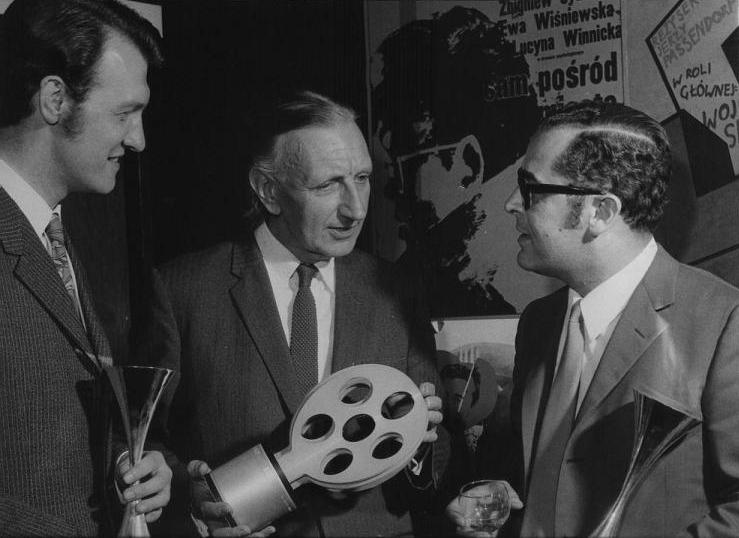
Cecil Satariano (1930–1996)

- Joe Sacco (born 1960), cartoonist
- Toni Sant (born 1968), art and television director, producer, television presenter, music journalist
- Cecil Satariano (1930–1996), film director, film maker, film censor, author
- Giorgio Costantino Schinas (1834–1894), architect, civil engineer
- Antonio Sciortino (1879–1947), sculptor
- Carm Lino Spiteri (1932–2008), architect, politician
- Joseph M. Spiteri (1934–2013), architect

== T ==
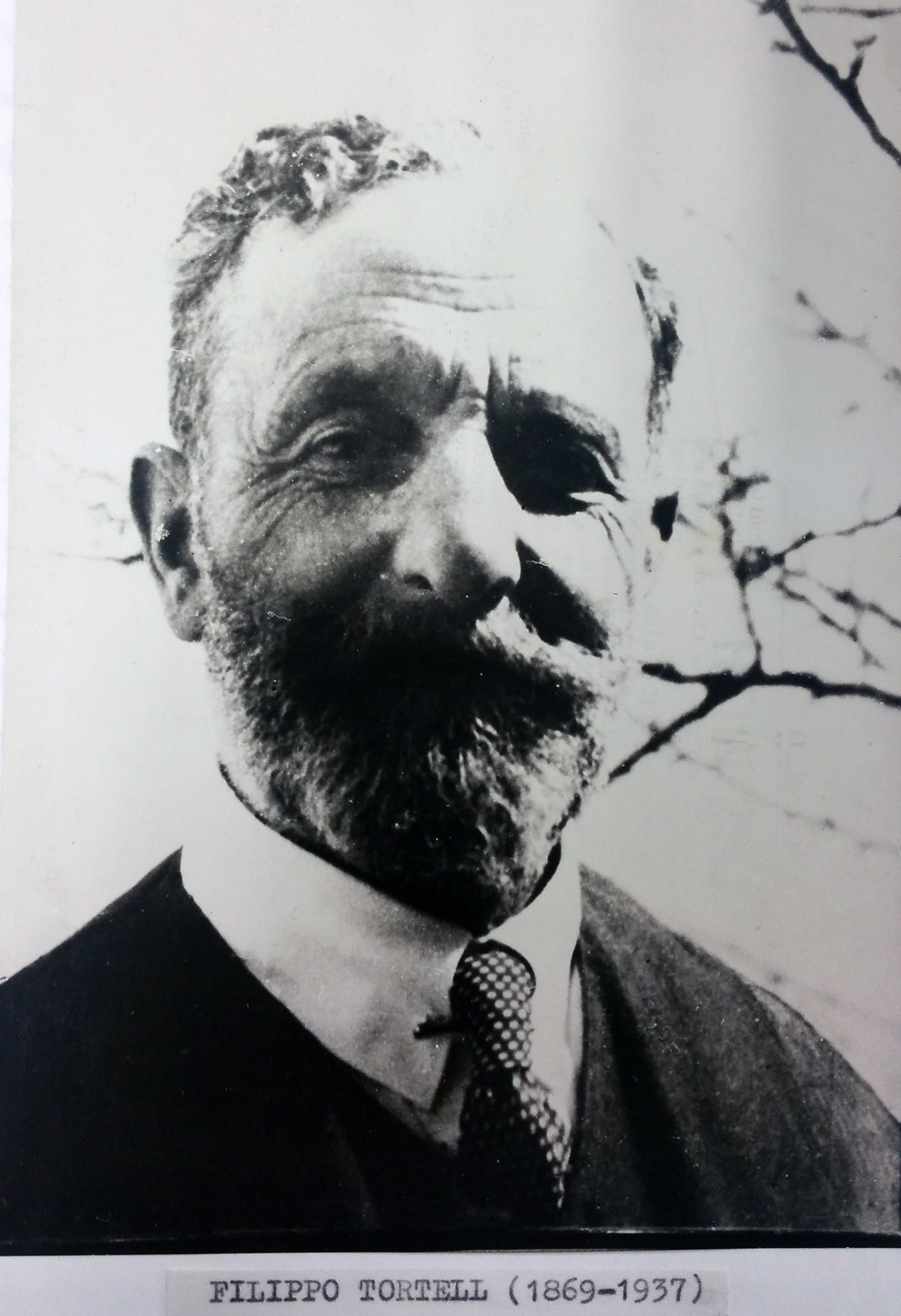
Philip Tortell (1869–1937)

- Enrique Tabone (born 1987), designer
- Ritty Tacsum (born 1990), visual artist
- Philip Tortell (1869–1937), architect
- Pietro Paolo Troisi (1686–1743), Baroque sculptor, silversmith, medallist, designer, engraver

== V ==
- Andrea Vassallo (1856–1928), architect, sculptor
- Gianni Vella (1885–1977), painter, cartoonist
- Karmenu Vella (born 1950), architect, politician
- Gustavo R. Vincenti (1888–1974), architect, developer

== Z ==
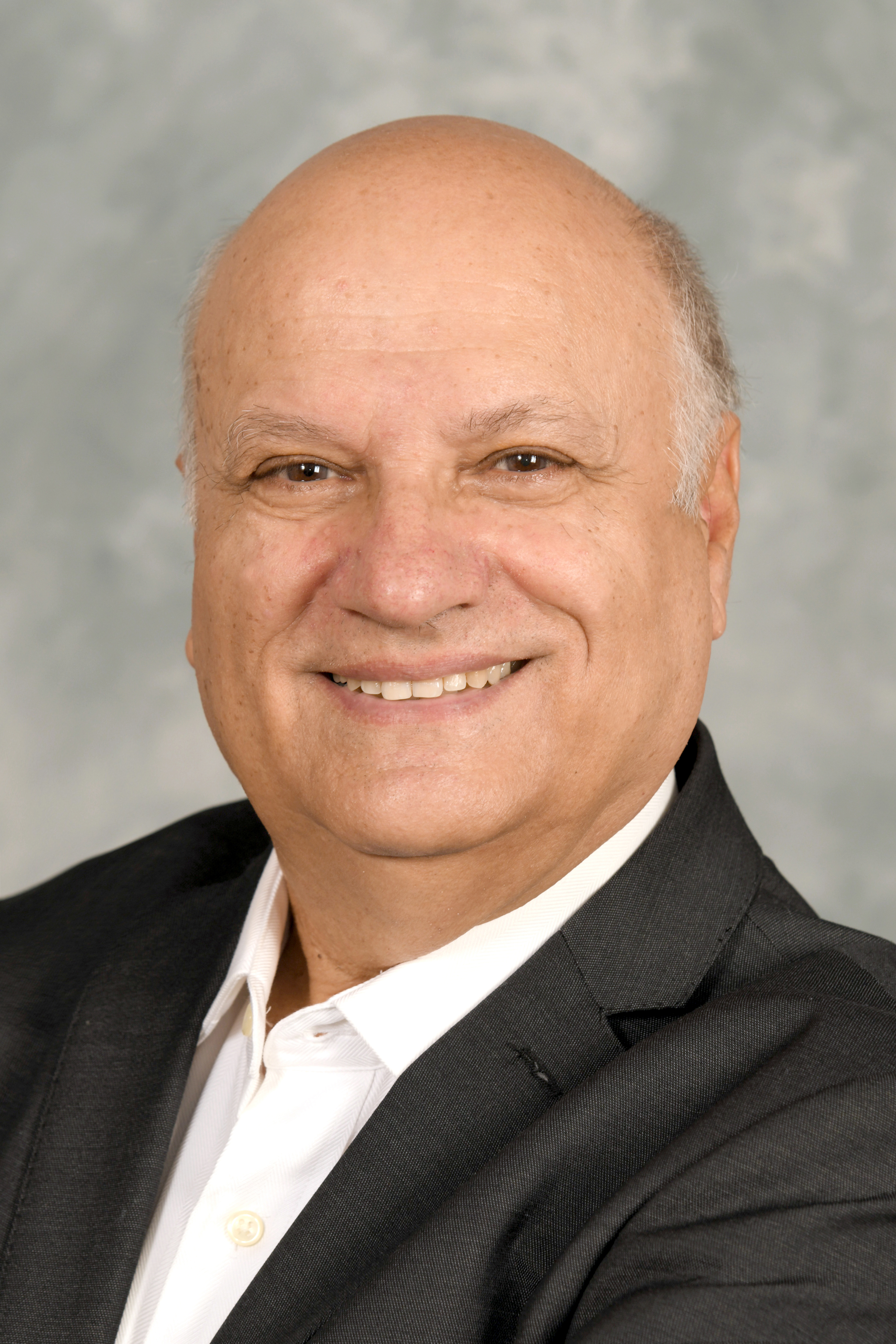
Trevor Zahra (born 1947)

- Francesco Zahra (1710–1773), painter
- Trevor Zahra (born 1947), illustrator, novelist, poet
- Jean Zaleski (1920–2010), painter
- Nicholas Zammit (1815–1899), architect, designer, philosopher
- Francesco Zerafa (1679–1758), architect
- Carlo Zimech (1696–1766), priest, painter
