= John Busuttil Leaver =

Maltese visual artist and painter (born 1964)

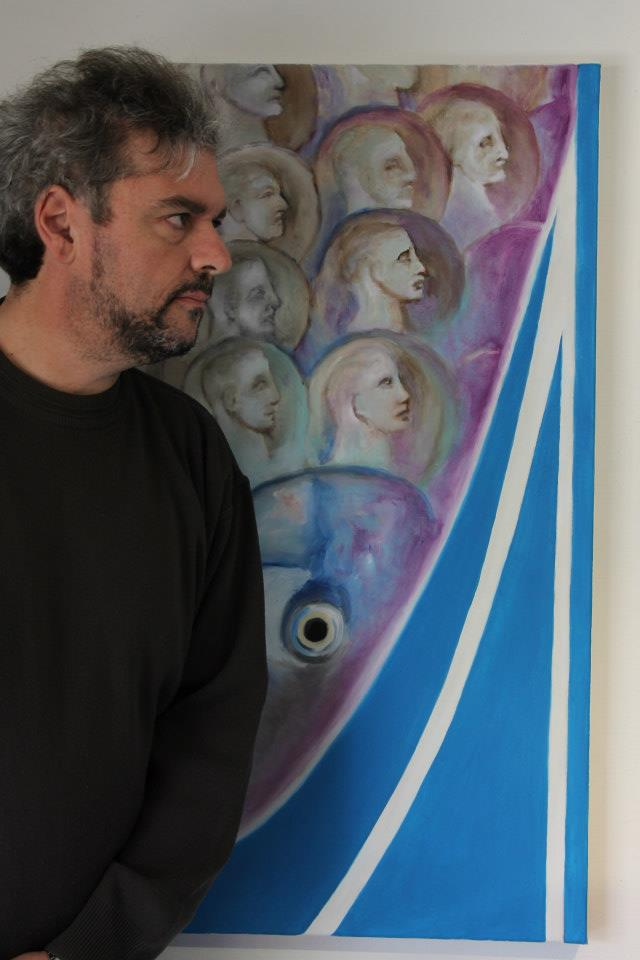
John Busuttil Leaver Maltese artist & graphic designer

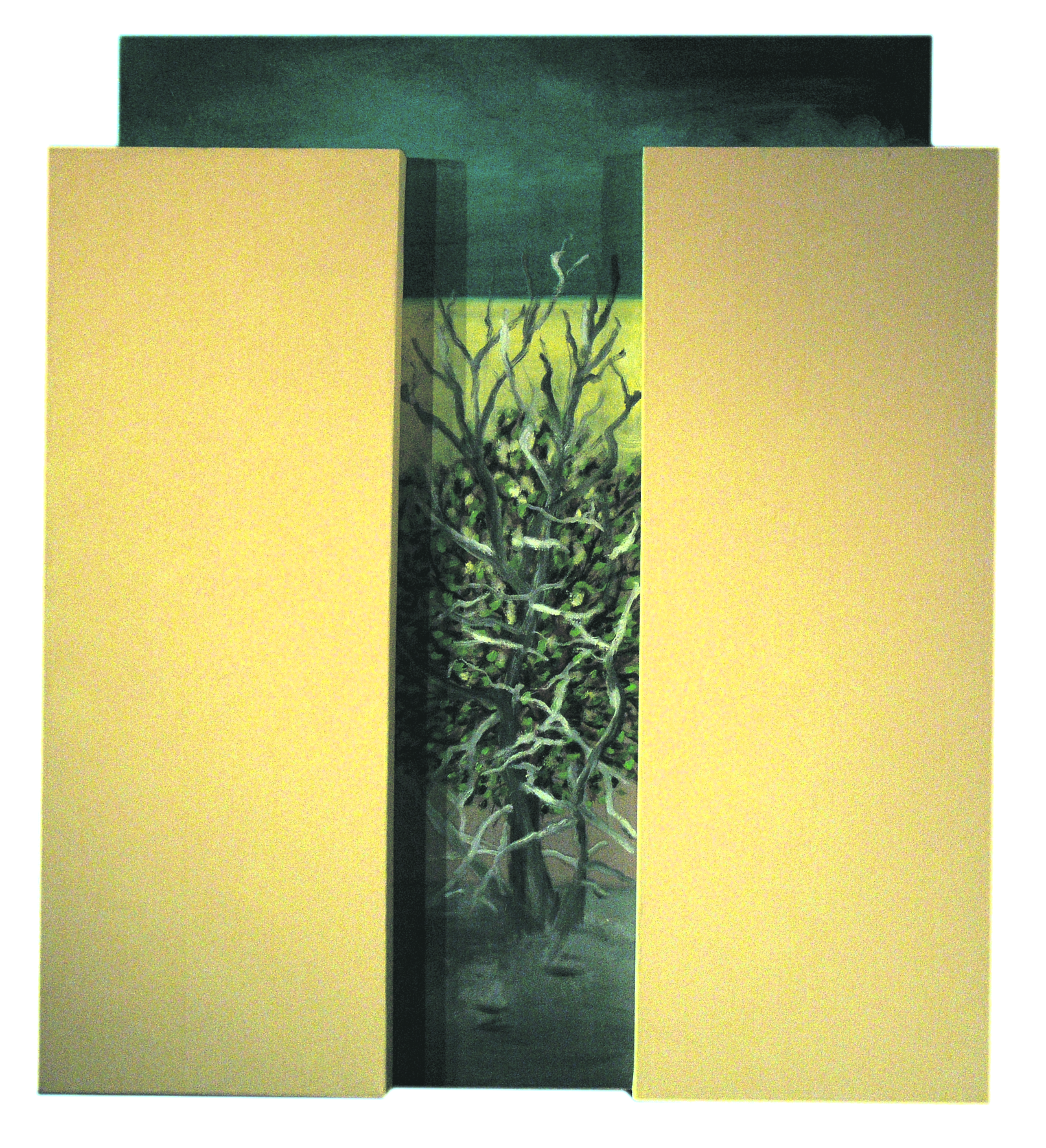
John Busuttil Leaver's 'TREEWALLS' painting depicted nature being hemmed in by development.

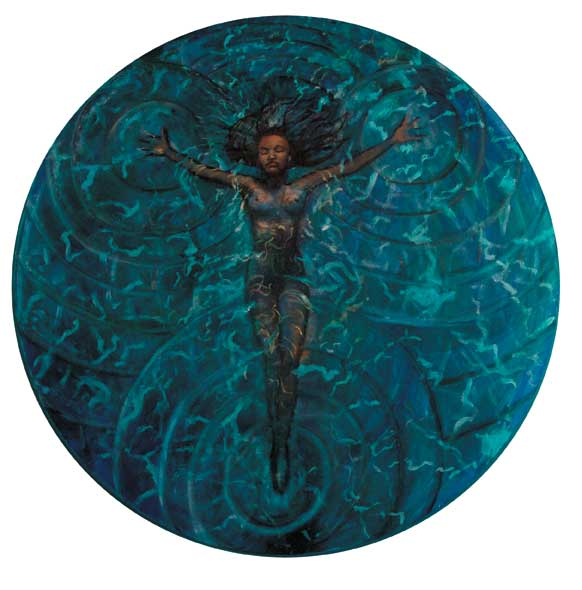
'Floating Spirit', oil on canvas by John Busuttil Leaver, 2008

John Busuttil Leaver (born John Robert Busuttil; 1964) is a Maltese visual artist and painter. He has worked in graphic book design and written about contemporary art. He is philosophical about his work and sees what he does as non-commercial: a statement about the contemporary. He is known for his solo show 'A Diary of Obsessions', (2008, Saint James Cavalier Centre for Creativity, Valletta) for work which commented against overdevelopment.

Busuttil Leaver studied at the Malta Government School of art under Harry Alden, and later at The Art and Design Centre, Valletta. He began working as a graphic designer but continued to paint and participate in many collectives. The National Museum of Fine Arts, gave him a one-man showing in 1997. The Museum made an acquisition of his work later in 1999. Other one-man shows followed in various galleries and art venues. In 2014 he exhibited work in London.

A number of art critics and curators have covered his work including Nicholas de Piro, Michael J. Schiavone, Emanuel Fiorentino, Dominic Cutajar, Dennis Vella, Adrian Stivala Raphael Vella and Dr Louis Lagana The Times of Malta published various articles. He won a number of art competitions and was featured in radio and TV programmes most noteworthy of which was a Canadian TV Cultural programme, 'TV Frames', during their feature on Malta.

== Chronology, list of exhibitions ==
=== Collective ===
- Maltafest, National Arts Festival, Valletta, Malta 1984/87/88/89/90/96/97.
- Lion's Club Art Collective, National Museum of Archaeology, Valletta, Malta 1987/93.
- Industrial Design Competition Exhibition (PL Light fitting), National Museum of Fine Arts, Valletta, Malta 1986.
- Maltese German Circle, Valletta, Malta 1987 Chamber of Commerce, Valletta, Malta 1988.
- Arti Independenza, National Gallery of Fine Arts, Valletta, Malta 1989.
- Muzikafest Art, (NSTF), Malta University, 1989.
- Solidarity with Poland Art Show, MUT Premises, Valletta, Malta 1989.
- Din L-Art Helwa, Malta National Trust Art Show, Naxxar, Malta 1990/91.
- MAS Charity Collective, Chamber of Commerce, Valletta, Malta 1991.
- Permatex Art Show, Royal British Legion, Valletta, Malta 1992.
- Association of Maltese Artists, Palazzo De La Salle, Valletta, Malta 1992.
- Teacher's Whiskey Art Award Finalist's Show, National Museum of Fine Arts, Valletta −1992/93/95.
- Cathedral Museum Collective Contemporary Art Show, Mdina 1994/5/6.
- Kreativa, Finalist Collective Show (Institute of Visual Arts), National Museum of Fine Arts, Valletta 1996.
- Ta' Ganu Windmill - Arts, Cultural and Crafts Centre, Birkirkara, Malta. 1996.
- Contemporary Christian Art in Malta, Cathedral Museum, Mdina 1996, 2007.
- Eden Foundation Art Charity Show, Gozo, 1997/98.
- SEDQA – Art, Substance of Life, University Campus April 2000.
- First National Art Competition 2002 – Trade Fair Grounds Naxxar–November 2002.
- Millennium Chapel Foundation, Group Charity show – Hilton Malta, November 2003.
- De La Salle Brothers Centenary Show, Palazzo De La Salle, Valletta, 2003.
- Girgenti (Prime Minister's official residence) open day collective- Palazz tal-Inquizitur, Girgenti, Malta 2006.
- Flimkien ghal Ambjent Ahjar Christmas Collective – Casino Maltese, Valletta, 2008.
- Birgu Art Collective – Maritime Museum, Birgu, Malta, 2009

=== Personal ===
- 'Circles', Auberge de Provence, Valletta, Malta, Nov 1988.
- 'Painting', New Gallery, National Museum of Archaeology, Malta, Dec 1991.
- 'Majjistral', National Museum of Fine Arts, Valletta, Malta 1997.
- 'Manscapes', The Labyrinth Art Gallery' Valletta, Malta 1999.
- 'Woman', Le Meridian Phoenicia, Floriana, Malta 2002.
- 'BLU', VGB Art Gallery, Valletta, Malta 2002.
- 'Green', VGB Art Gallery, Valletta, Malta 2004.
- 'RETRO-04', Cleland & Souchet, Portomaso, Malta 2004.
- 'Unseen Selections', Corinthia Palace Hotel, San Anton 2004.
- 'A Diary of Obsessions', St James Cavalier, Centre for Creativity, Valletta, Malta, 2008

== See also ==
- List of Maltese artists
- National Museum of Fine Arts, Malta
