= Tony Briffa =

Tony Briffa may refer to:

- Tony Briffa (artist) (born 1959), Maltese artist in Denmark
- Tony Briffa (politician) (born 1971), Australian-Maltese intersex mayor
