= Tortell =

Tortell may refer to:

- Greg Tortell, a.k.a. Tortelvis, a member of Dread Zeppelin, a now-defunct American reggae rock band
- Philip Tortell (1869–1937), Maltese architect
- Simon Tortell (1959–2012), Maltese footballer
- Roscón, also known as Tortell, a sweet bread-based ring-shaped dessert
