= Michael Azzopardi =

Maltese musician and designer (born 1987)

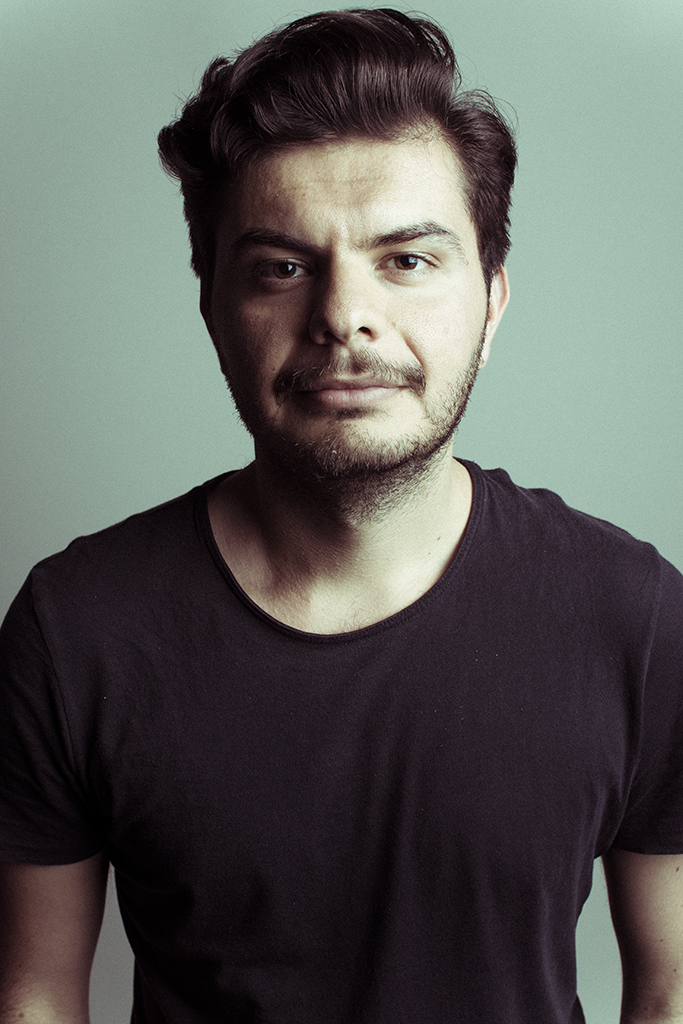
- Michael Azzopardi in 2014.

Background information
- Born: 21 April 1987 (age 39); Marsaskala, Malta
- Genres: Pop Rock; Indie Rock
- Occupations: singer-songwriter; recording artist
- Instruments: vocals; guitar; keyboards
- Years active: 2020–present
- Label: Ultralow

Michael Azzopardi (born 1987) is a Maltese songwriter and digital designer. He released his first 4-song EP "Pistola" on February 12, 2021, with Ultralow Records.

== Biography ==
Michael Azzopardi is a singer-songwriter from Malta. Having debuted his first EP, PISTOLA in February 2021, Michael's songs present an intimate and varied song arrangement with emotionally rich and often vulnerable lyrics.

== Startups ==
After graduating from Kingston University, London, Azzopardi worked as a digital designer for Burson Marsteller where he met partner Sebastian Hefel. Together they co-founded Seb Azzo in 2013, and went to create eLearning products for clients including Carlsberg, Air Malta, Ibis Hotels, Novotel Hotels, Accor Group and Uniworld. As well as designing for a range of clients, Michael is also a visiting lecturer at the University of Malta teaching digital design.

In 2015 he set up heyday.events, an events company aimed at creating networking events and lectures for creatives.

In 2018, Michael Azzopardi started a new company Innform, a new eLearning SaaS tool for the hospitality industry that is planned to launch late 2018.

Michael also founded an eLearning software company Seb Azzo in London (2013) with Sebastian Hefel. He later started Heyday, an edutainment organisation for up and coming creatives.

Michael Azzopardi co-founded Seb Azzo in February 2013. Seb Azzo is a London-based digital design company.

Michael Azzopardi founded Innform in July 2018 with Sebastian Hefel. Innform is an eLearning software that simplifies hospitality training.

Michael Azzopardi founded Heyday.events in March 2015 with Sebastian Hefel.

== Discography ==
Singles:

- Fik Ħolqien (2020, Ultralow Music)
- Skrejjen (2020, Ultralow Music)
- Taħt il-Kmiem (2020, Ultralow Music)
- Tiblagħni L-Art (2020, Ultralow Music)
