= Luigi Maria Galea =

Maltese marine painter (1847–1917)

Fisherman on the Maltese coast by Luigi Galea, oil on board

Luigi Maria Galea (1847–1917) was a Maltese marine painter. He was trained in Malta as well as in Naples and Rome, Italy. His work, which often depicts Royal Navy vessels, is held in the Royal Collection.
