= Mark Mallia =

Maltese outsider artist (1965–2024)

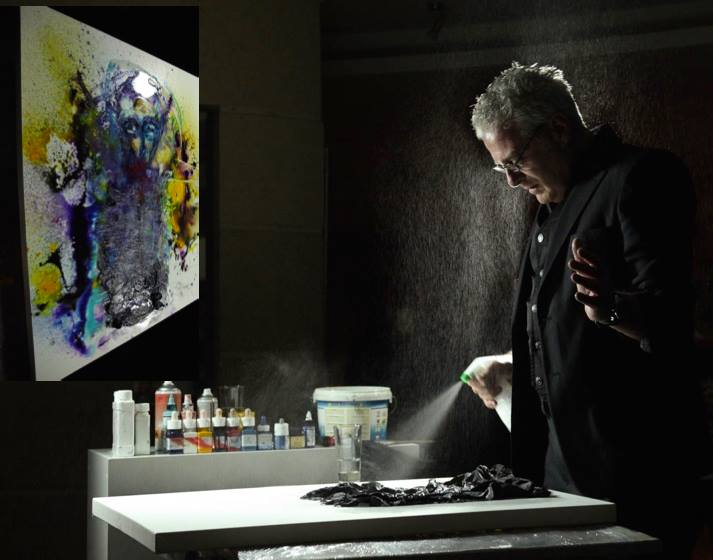
- Mallia during a live performance, c. 2015
- Born: 20 April 1965; Pietà, Malta
- Died: 23 July 2024 (aged 59); Msida, Malta
- Known for: Painting, sculpture

Mark Mallia (20 April 1965 – 23 July 2024) was a Maltese self-taught outsider artist who worked with abstract and portrait paintings on a variety of mixed media and ceramic sculptures, who worked in Malta, Monaco, the United Kingdom and the United States.

== Biography ==
Mallia was born in Pietà, Malta, on 20 April 1965.

His signature style imparts an aggressive energy to his art, fed by his maniacal obsessions that metamorphose into mischief, audacity, insouciance, and mystery. Mallia was known for his maverick character which was useful in creating a diverse spectrum of works.

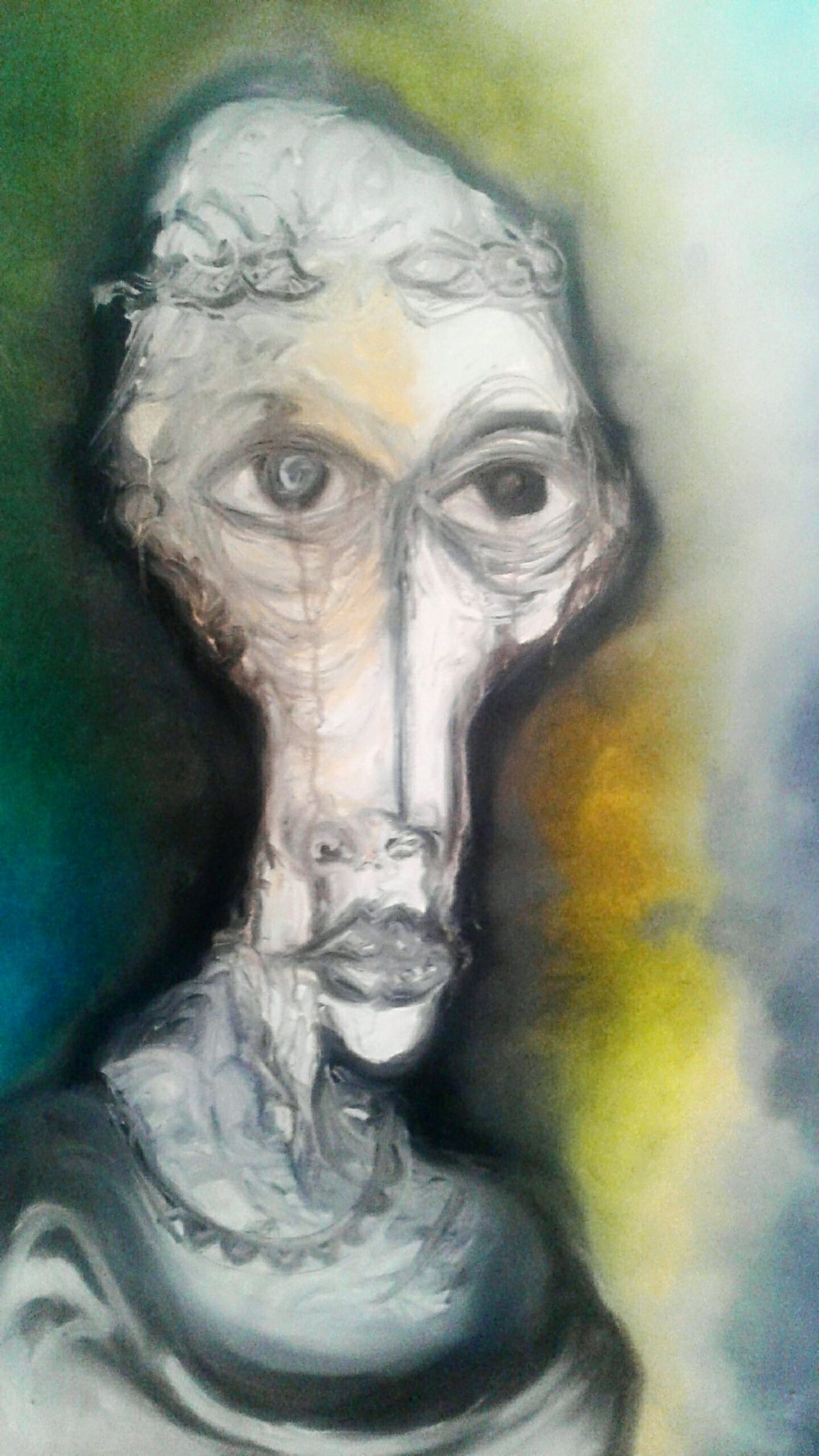
Mark Mallia - Narcissus broke his mirror - 120×80cm, Oil on Canvas

Major exhibitions of his work have included various solos in Malta such as Open Closet, Postcards from Beyond, Black Canvas and Zabach exhibitions, together with collective exhibitions such as Forgotten Spaces, at the Royal Windsor Racecourse UK, at Art Basel Miami, and at the Sporting Club in Monaco.

Mallia was also known for raising funds and awareness of ALS in Malta.

Mallia collaborated with Angelo Dalli during 2018–2019 on exploring the new space between art and artificial intelligence using the Universal Machine Artist system, teaching AI the concepts of creativity of visual expression.

Mallia died at Mater Dei Hospital in Malta, on 23 July 2024, two days after suffering an aneurysm. He was 59.

The SpaceX Fram2 mission carried aurora-related artwork by Mallia and Etienne Farrell in a polar orbit in space.
