= Ta' Ganu Windmill =

18th-century structure in Malta

Coordinates: 35.89993°N 14.4559°E

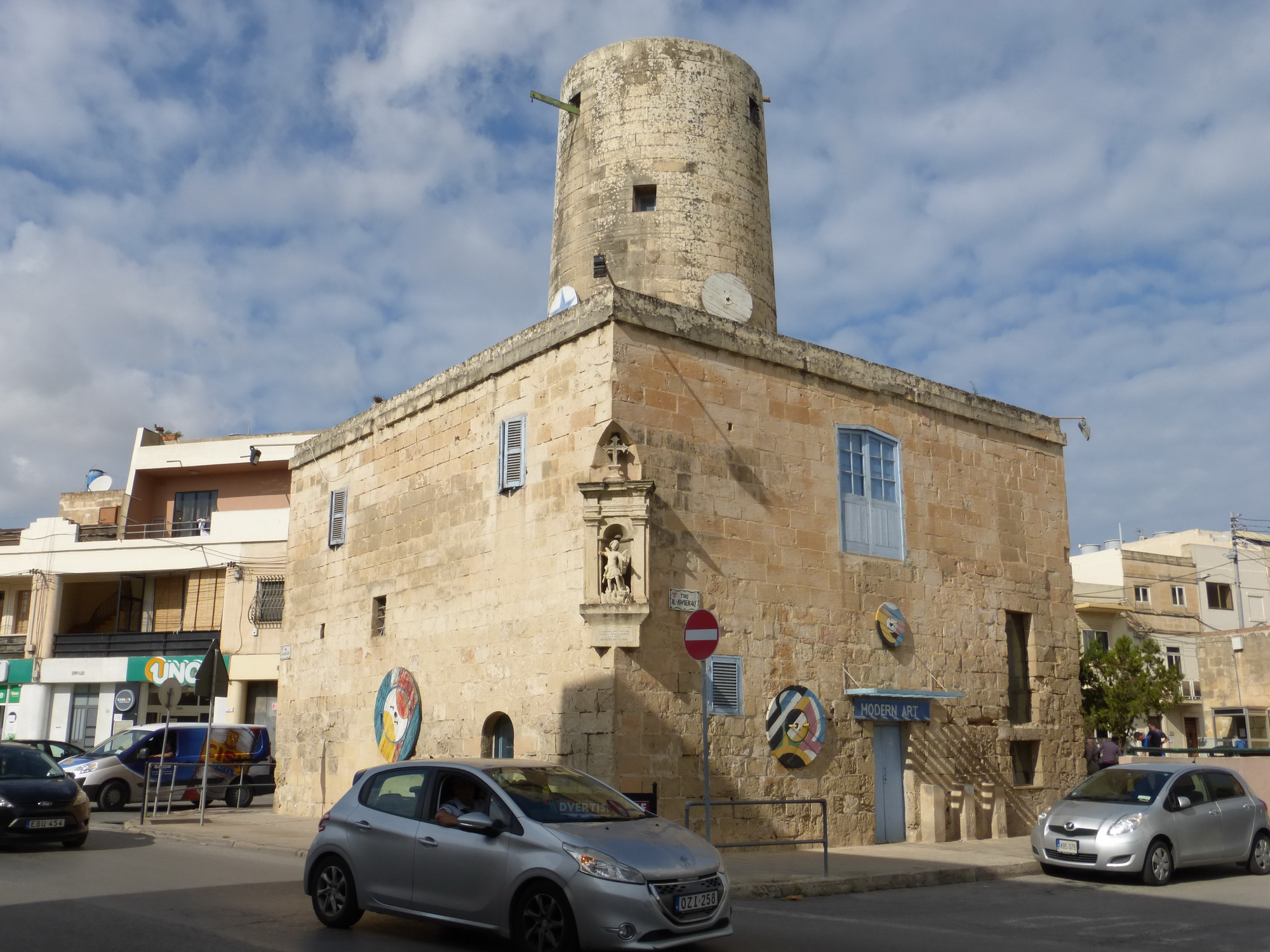
Ta' Ganu Windmill in Birkirkara, Malta

Ta' Ganu Windmill (also known as Tal-Maħlut Windmill) is an eighteenth century windmill in Birkirkara, Malta. It was built in 1724 by the António Manoel de Vilhena Foundation. "Maħlut", the alternative name also used for it historically, is the Maltese word for a mixture of wheat and hops used for making bread.

By the end of the 1920s, the windmill was no longer in use for its originally intended purpose and served only as a place of residence. During World War II it was used as an air raid shelter, and it became a blacksmith's workshop in the 1970s.

After a period of abandonment, the windmill was entrusted to Maltese artist Gabriel Caruana who renovated it and turned it into a venue for art exhibitions that was inaugurated in 1990.
