= Sarah Ann Harrison =

English photographer (1837–?)

Sarah Ann Harrison (1837–?) is the earliest documented female photographer in Malta. She was born in Plymouth in 1837 to Abraham and Sarah Roberts. On August 9, 1864, she married George Harrison, from Stenigot, Lincolnshire in Valletta, Malta. Between 1864 and 1871, Sarah Ann operated in her name from 74, Strada della Marina, Isola (Senglea), Malta. A Carte de visite original discovered by Giovanni Bonello (and now in the national Malta carte collection) confirms her operating as an independent photographer in Senglea, Malta at that time. Sarah Ann Harrison is considered to be the first woman running her own photo studio in Malta. In the 1871 UK census she is listed as a photographer operating in Boston, Lincolnshire.
