= Adelaide Conroy =

Adelaide Conroy née Anceschi (born 1839) was a Malta-based photographer active between 1871 and 1879.

Adelaide was born on 23 April 1839 to Pompilio Anceschi and Rosa Bolondi in Reggio d'Emilia, Italy. Together with James Conroy his first wife Sara, their newborn Jane, Richard Ellis, Adelaide came to Malta from Messina on 9 April 1861 on a ship called Capitole. On 17 May 1872 in the Anglican Cathedral, Valletta Adelaide married the then widowed photographer James Conroy.

From 1875, Adelaide was operating from 56, Strada Stretta, Valletta as Mrs. Conroy – one of the photographers in the Conroy studio. Between February and June 1878 Adelaide advertises as "Mrs. Conroy, English photographers, 56 Strada Stretta, Valletta" in all 12 issues of the short-lived Enterprise magazine (no English photographers are documented to have been working at this studio - Augusto Felice was Maltese, whereas E. Taurines was French).
