= Ray Piscopo =

Maltese artist and painter

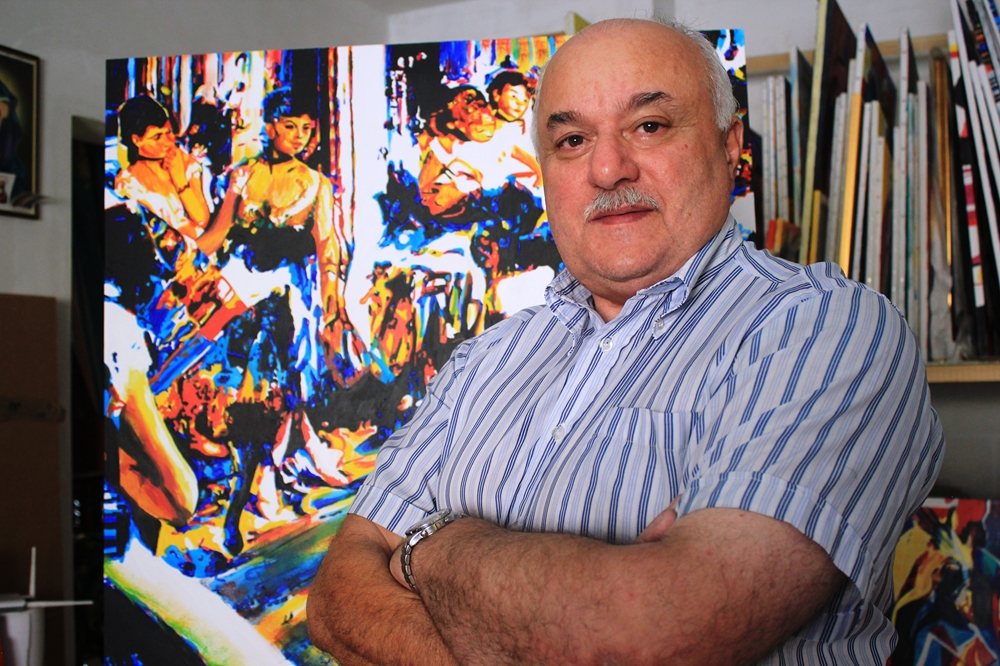
- Ray Piscopo
- Born: 27 April 1954 (age 72); Marsa
- Website: https://piscopoart.com

Ray Piscopo (born 27 April 1954 in Marsa, Malta) is a Maltese artist and painter.

== Biography ==
Piscopo was born to Antonio Piscopo and Mary (née Attard). An engineer by profession, his introduction to the world of art can be traced to the early 1970s, when he was tutored by Antoine Camilleri (1922-2005).

Over the years, Piscopo has become renowned for his bold use of colour and evocative subjects, with his art being defined as Realism (arts) by one of Malta's most accomplished poets and philosophers, Professor Oliver Friggieri (1947-2020). His art has been exhibited in many countries, including in Italy where, in 2008, he placed second during the third edition of the Premio di Arte Figurativa Piero Della Francesca in Arezzo.

Over the years, Piscopo has used his art and notoriety to help further causes he believes in. In 2005, Piscopo served as a member of a specially formed Healing Arts Committee through the Foundation for Medical Services, which was entrusted with the embellishment of public spaces within Mater Dei Hospital, Malta's main hospital, with suitable artwork. 10 years later, Piscopo represented Malta in a global project by French artist Klaus Guingand, entitled Art Warning the World. The project saw 201 artists from 200 countries come together to raise awareness on the importance of freedom in a video watched by 1.5 million people in 18 days. Then, in 2018, the artist was asked by the current Archbishop of Malta, Mons. Charles J. Scicluna, to mark World Poverty Day through a series of paintings. The result was an exhibition entitled Values Are Being Trampled Upon, which included subjects that ranged from migration to war, and domestic violence to child labour. In 2020, meanwhile, Piscopo donated two paintings to an exhibition by The Shift News, which aimed to celebrate the news site's third anniversary and raise funds for them to continue their work in investigative journalism.

Piscopo's latest exhibition, OPUS 20XX, was launched digitally amid the global COVID-19 pandemic.

== Artistic style ==
In varied phases of his career as an artist, Piscopo has tried various media starting with oils, frescos and tempera, before moving on to watercolour, acrylics, and oils. In recent years, Piscopo has been liberally using mixed media on canvas and has returned to the use of oil paint. His work has been described as 'an attempt at achieving simplicity' and that it 'transforms and transcends the reproduction of nature' by art historian and Smithsonian Institution lecturer, Joseph Paul Cassar.

== Personal life ==
Piscopo is married to Marthese (née Grixti), and they have four children together. He is an engineer by profession.
