= Cecil Satariano =

Maltese film-maker (1930–1996)

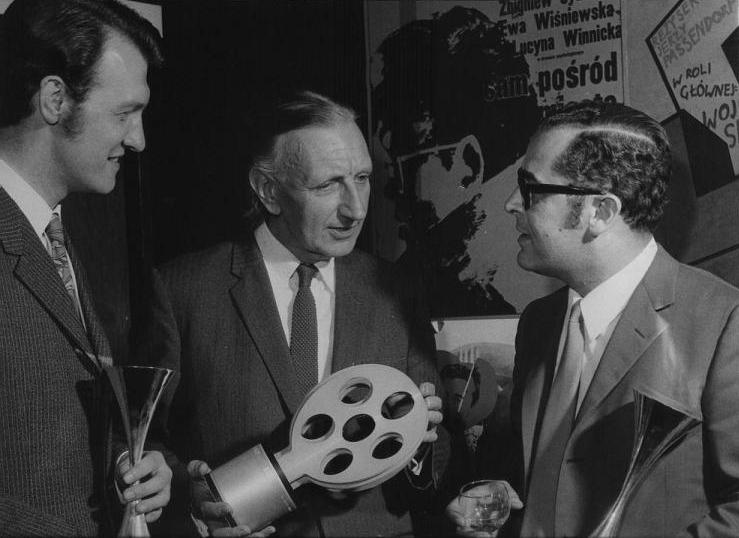
- Cecil Satariano.
- Born: 29 September 1930; Malta
- Died: 16 December 1996 (aged 66)

Cecil Satariano (1930–1996) was a Maltese film-maker, film critic, film censor and author. A self-taught amateur film maker he bought his first cine camera, a Canon 518 Super 8 camera as a Christmas present to himself in 1968. In 1970 his first film "I'm Furious...Red" gained a Ten Best award in the UK "Movie Maker" magazine competition, the first Super 8 film to do so. The following year with "Giuseppi" he won the top award in the same competition. His subsequent films "The Beach" and "Ilona" did not achieve the same recognition although "The Beach" also received a Ten Best trophy. His next film "Katarin" was shot on 16mm and took several years to make including the preparation of an English language soundtrack. "Katarin" was not entered into the Ten Best Competition but was distributed to cinemas by EMI in the UK as a short film.

== Personal life ==
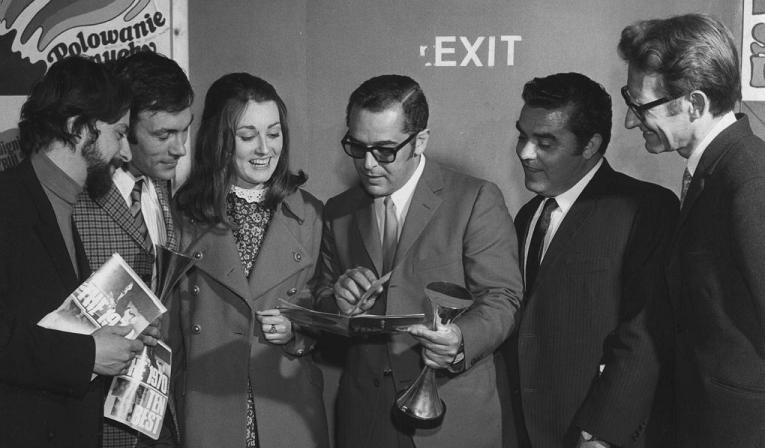
Cecil receiving a filmography award in London

Cecil Satariano originally worked in the Malta telegraph office of Cable and Wireless and became a part-time journalist and film critic for the Sunday Times of Malta. A film enthusiast, he also read widely but had no formal film making training. A member of the Malta Cine Circle, he was invited to join the Malta Censorship Board in 1972. He was the author of Canon Fire!, a book which discussed his personal approach to choosing a theme, scripting, casting and using actors effectively.

Satariano was married and fathered three children.

He is buried at the Santa Maria Addolorata Cemetery in Paola, the largest burial ground of Malta.

== Filmography ==
- I'm Furious …Red (1970). Leading players: Frank Pisani, Lauren Clews.
- Giuseppi (1972). Assisted by Mario Philip Azzopardi. Leading players: Giuseppi Mallia, Frank Pisani, Karmen Azzopardi.
- The Beach (1973). Assisted by Rita Pirotta. Leading players: Mary Blackman, Ettore Calleja, Carmenu Gruppetta, John Navarro, Frank Pisani.
- Ilona (1974). Leading player: Vanessa Webber
- Katarin (1977) Leading player: Anna Straface, Frank Pisani.

All the films except "I'm Furious.." were made in partnership with Ronnie Demajo (Satadema). Giuseppi Mallia can also be seen in a cameo role in Pulp (1972) directed by Mike Hodges in scenes shot in Malta. Cecil Satariano and Frank Pisani also appear briefly in walk on roles.

== Book ==
- Satariano, Cecil (1973). Canon Fire! The Art of Making Award Winning Amateur Movies. London: Bachman & Turner. ISBN 0-85974-002-1.
