= Philip Mifsud =

Philip Mifsud House of Representatives of Malta

Member of Parliament
- In office 2008–2013
- Constituency: 7th Electoral District

Personal details
- Born: July 9, 1971 (age 54) Pietà, State of Malta
- Party: Partit Nazzjonalista
- Profession: Architect

Philip Mifsud (born July 9, 1971) is a Maltese architect who is also involved in politics.

Mifsud graduated as an architect from the University of Malta in 1997. In 2000 Philip established his own practice and since then he runs an architectural firm under the name of PMa periti.

In 1999 he served as a Local Counciller in his home town Żebbuġ. He served as the Minority Leader of this locality between 1999 and 2008.

Mifsud served as a member of the Maltese parliament, he was elected to the House of Representatives of Malta in the 2008 Maltese general election, for the Partit Nazzjonalista. As a member of parliament, he represented the 7th electoral district, which includes Dingli, Mgarr, Mtarfa, Rabat and Żebbuġ.

In March 2010 Philip was appointed as Parliamentary Assistant in the Ministry of Resources and Rural Affairs. Philip also served as a member of the Public Accounts Committee (Malta)|Public Accounts Committee and of the National Audit Office Accounts Committee within the Maltese Parliament.
