= Michele Busuttil =

Maltese painter (1762–1831)

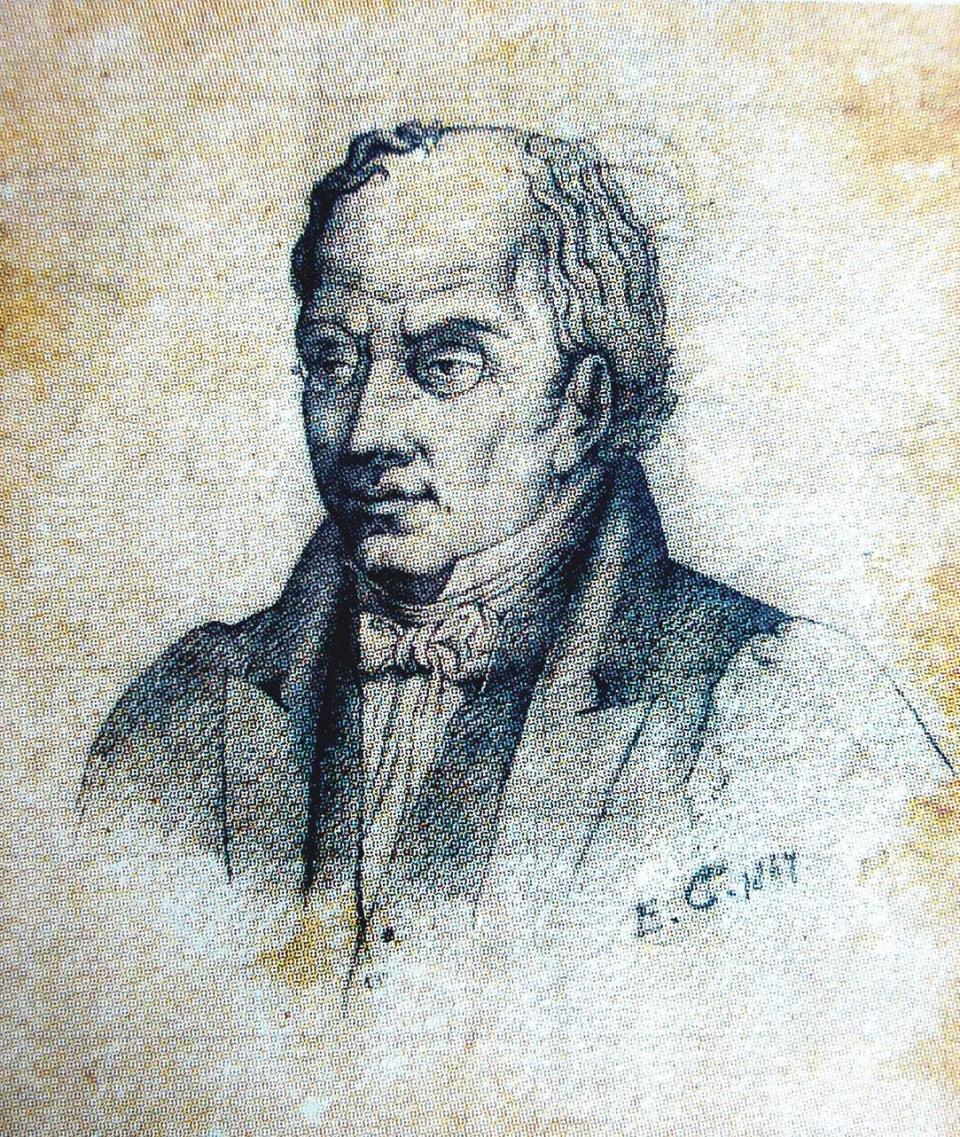
Self-portrait of Michele Busuttil, copy by E. Calleya

Michele Busuttil (14 June 1762 – 31 October 1831) was a Maltese painter, son of Clemente Busuttil and Rosa Magro.

== Biography ==
Busuttil was born on 14 June 1762 in Żejtun, Hospitaller Malta.

A student of art with Rocco Buhagiar (c. 1725–1805) in Valletta, at age 18 in 1780 Michele Busuttil moved to Rome alongside Giuseppe Grech (1755–1787) to continue his studies at the Accademia di San Luca, where he was tutored by sculptor Tommaso Rigi. Busuttil was awarded the second prize in drawing competitions in 1782 and 1783, right after Grech. Upon return to Malta he married Maria Antonia Buhagiar from Rabat, Gozo, with whom he had five children. Michele Busuttil opened a private art school next to his father's house in Strada Irlandese, Valletta (close to the Lower Barrakka), where he taught Massimo Gauci and Giorgio Pullicino, who would later assist him as university professor. His style remained close to baroque, although with influences of Neapolitan Neoclassicism.

In 1800 the rector of the University of Malta, Francesco Saverio Caruana, appointed Busuttil as first professore del disegno, in charge of the new Drawing School, with yearly wage of 200 scudi.

Busuttil lived a long life in Gozo, where he owned properties. He died in 1831 in Valletta and was buried in the family grave in the Collegiate Parish Church of St Paul's Shipwreck.

== Works ==
His works are scattered in Lija, Tarxien, Birgu, Żabbar and Żejtun on Malta; and at Fontana, Għajnsielem, Għarb, Rabat and Żebbuġ on Gozo.

- 1791, The Assumption of the Virgin, Cathedral of the Assumption, Victoria.
- 1793, Nativity of Mary, Cathedral of the Assumption, Victoria.
- 1793, Immaculate Conception, Cathedral of the Assumption, Victoria.
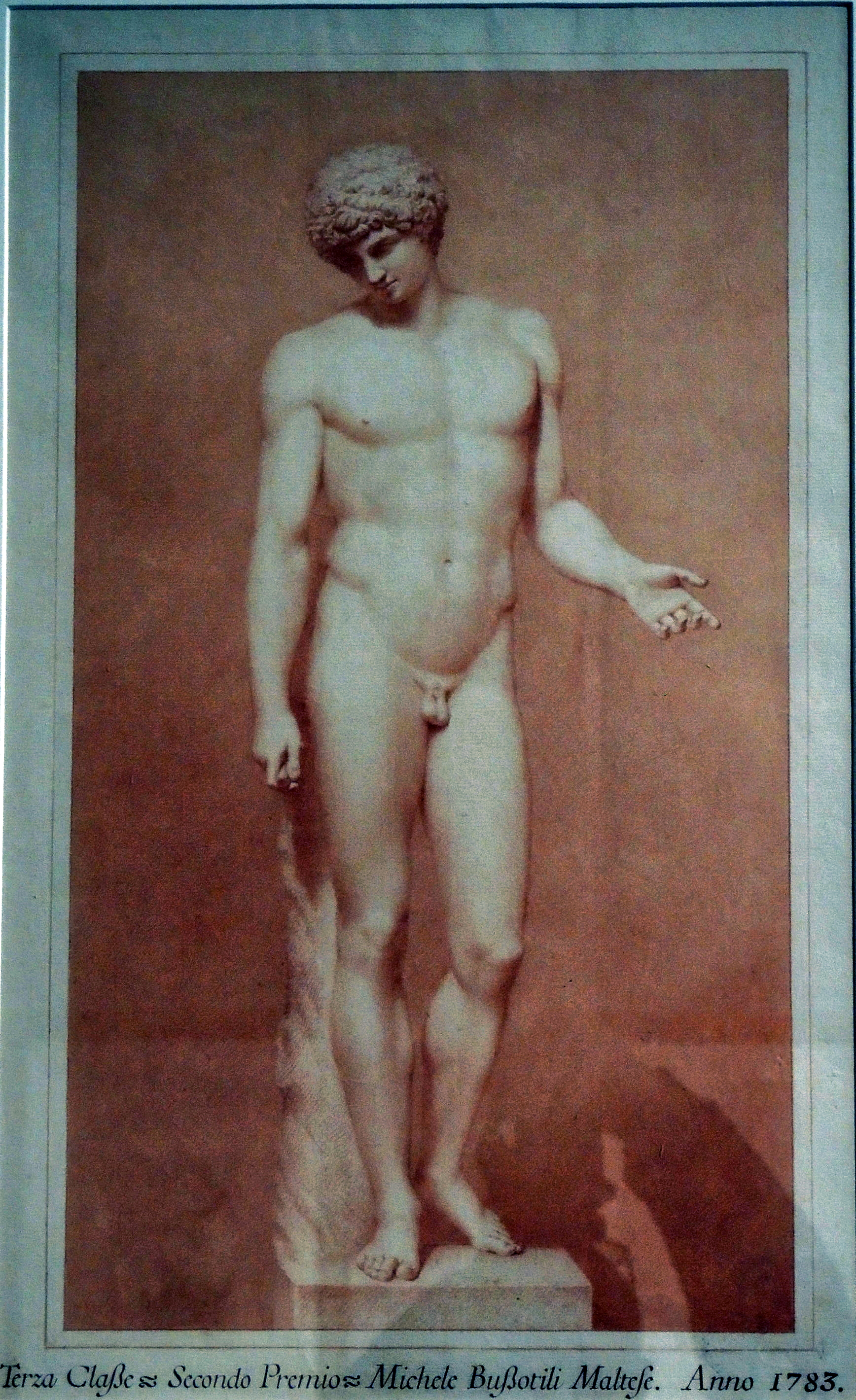
L'Antinoo del Campidoglio, 1783

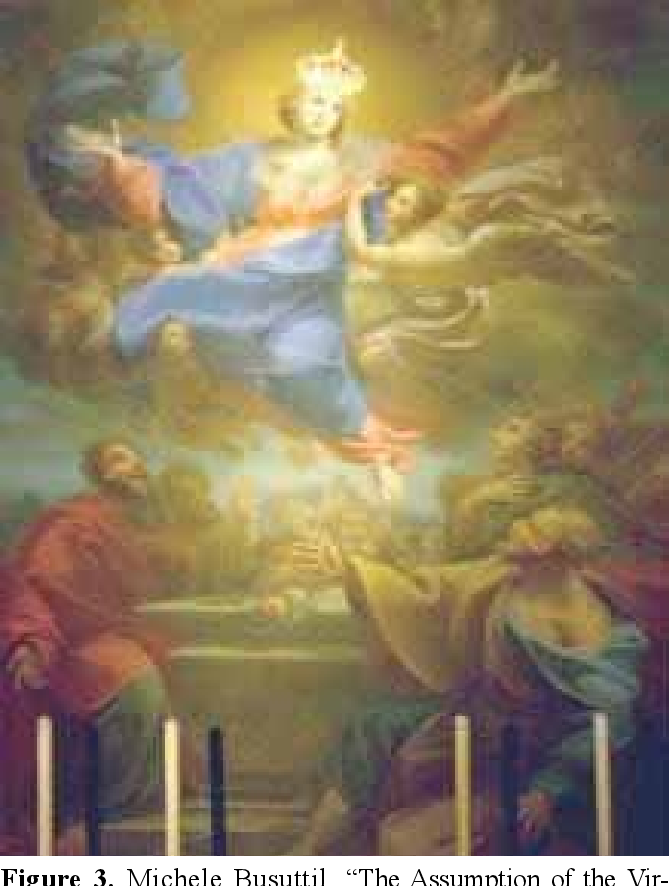
The Assumption of the Virgin, 1791 (Cathedral, Gozo)

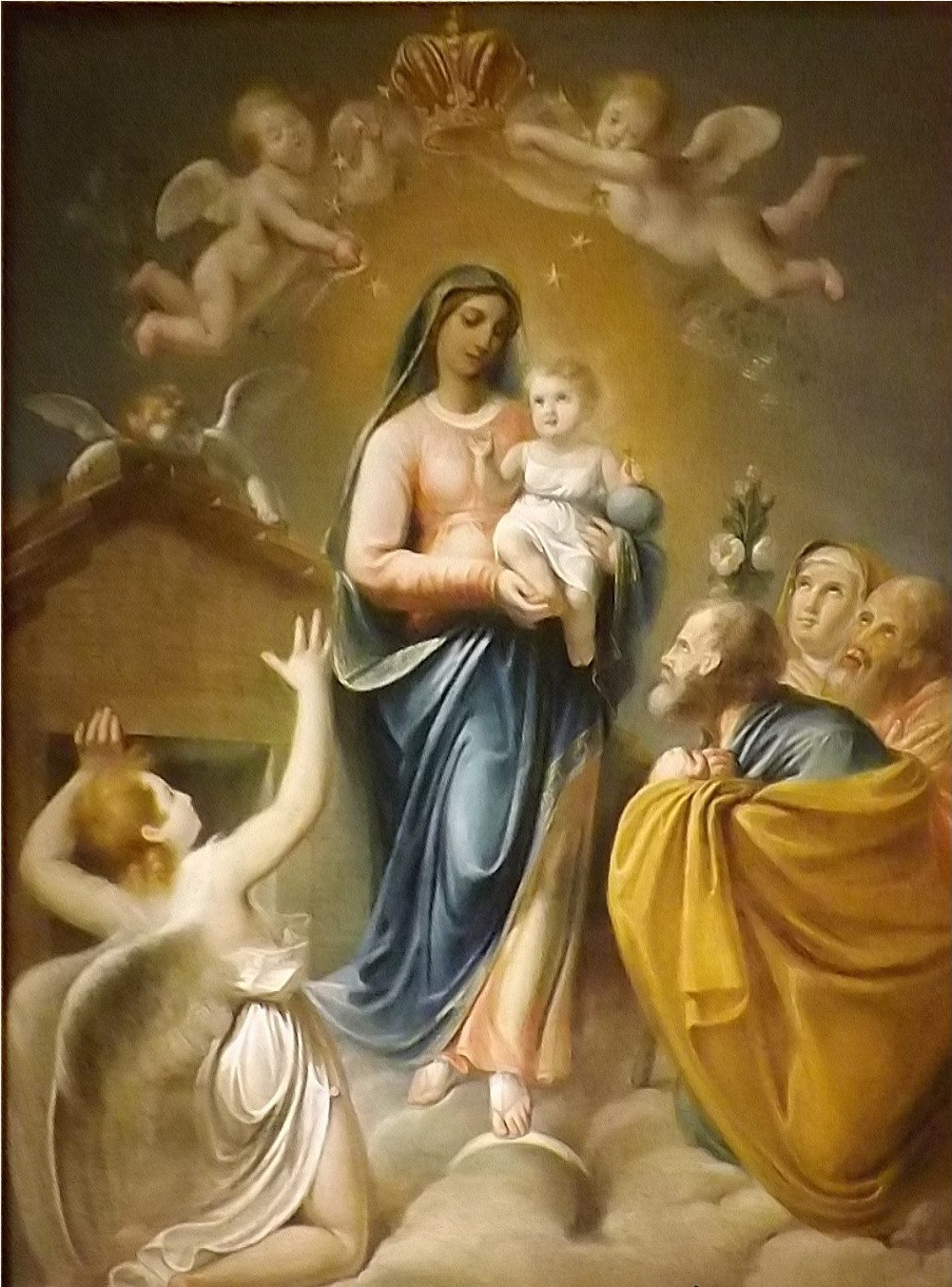
Il-Madonna ta' Loretu, 1820 (Ghajnsielem)

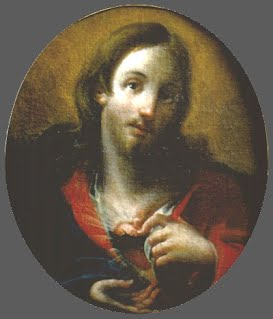
Sacred Heart of Jesus (Saint Catherine Church, Zejtun)

== Bibliography ==
- Sandro Debono, Bernardine Scicluna (eds.), The Busuttil Family: A Legacy of Three Generations, Midsea books 2010
