= Richard Ellis (Maltese photographer) =

British-Maltese photographer (1842–1924)

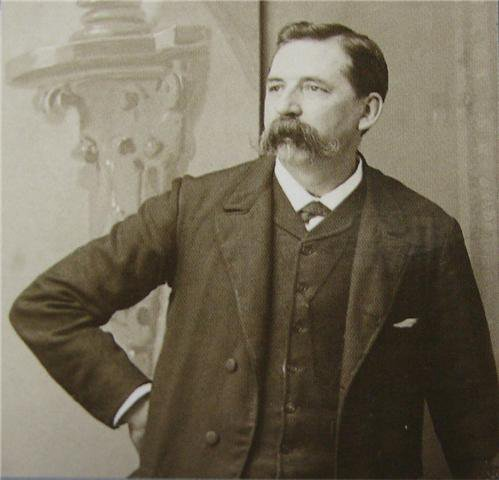
- Born: 27 January 1842; London, UK
- Died: 23 December 1924 (aged 82); Crown Colony of Malta
- Occupation: Photographer
- Years active: 1862–1924
- Spouse: Alfonsina Curmi
- Children: John Ellis, Amelia, Mary

Richard Ellis (27 January 1842 – 23 December 1924) was a British-Maltese photographer who was one of the pioneers of photography in Malta during the late 19th and early 20th centuries. Born in St. Luke's, East London, he travelled throughout Europe as a circus performer before settling down in Malta at the age of nineteen. Within a few years he had opened a studio in Valletta, and he became a renowned photographer. His archive of tens of thousands of photographs still exists, and his work is significant for both its historic value and technical quality.

== Early life ==
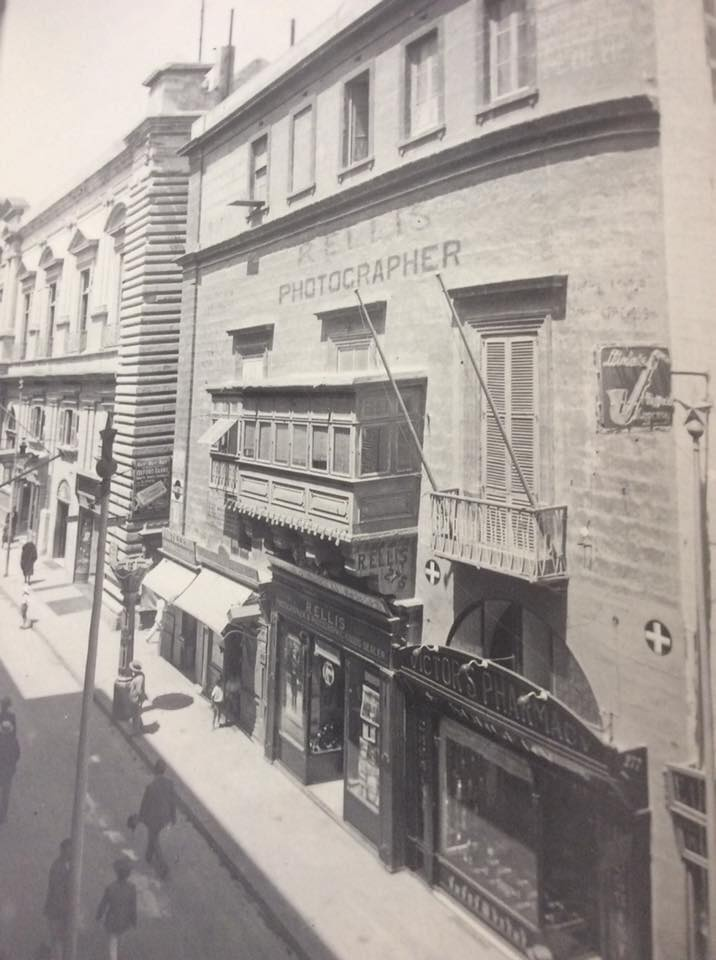
The Ellis Studio on Kingsway, Valletta

Ellis was born on the 27 January 1842 in St Luke's, London to James and Sarah Ellis, who at that time already had 5 children and later would have 7 more. As a child he became apprenticed to the circus performers James and Sarah Conroy. They travelled throughout Europe, with Ellis becoming a tightrope walker. During a trip to Paris, James Conroy and Richard Ellis became interested in photography and attended the Daguerre Institute. They later travelled throughout Italy and Sicily, but events related to the Italian unification led them to move to the nearest British colony, the Crown Colony of Malta. James, Sarah Conroy, their then-1 year old baby Jane, Adelaide Anceschi, and Richard Ellis arrived on the island on the 9th April 1861, where Richard became an apprentice in James Conroy's first studio in Strada Concezzione, Senglea.

== Career ==
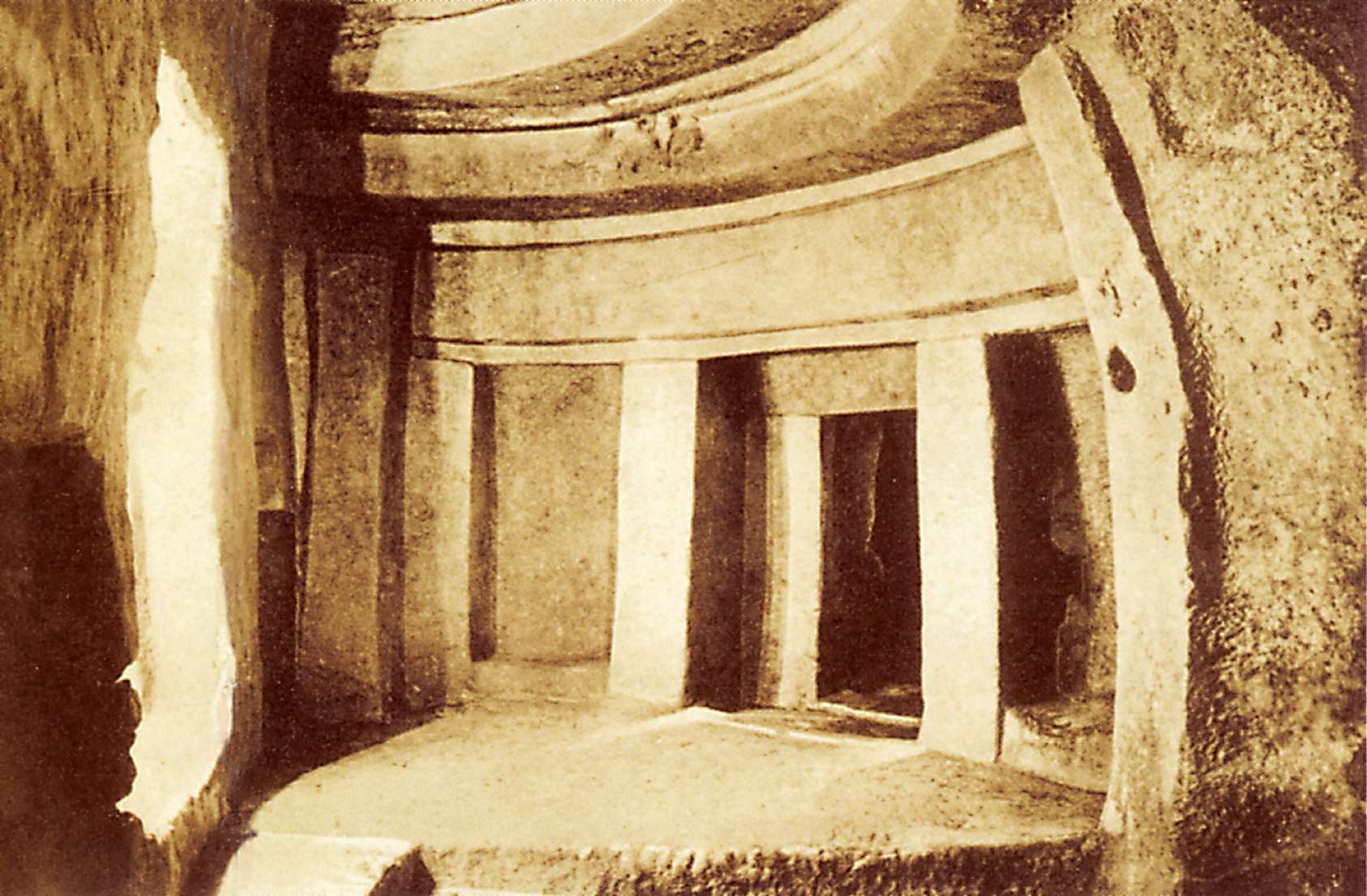
Ħal-Saflieni Hypogeum, photographed by Ellis, before 1910

On his arrival in Malta, James Conroy opened a Daguerreotype photography studio, where Ellis worked as his assistant. About 1865 James Conroy moved his studio to 56, Strada Stretta, Valletta. By 1870 James Conroy has opened additional premises at 134, Strada Stretta, where mostly carte de visite were produced.

In 1871 Ellis set up his own studio at 43, Strada Stretta, Valletta, probably due to the unconventional lifestyle of the Conroys and Anceschi. He was popular among both the locals and the British, since he had a British surname but was married to a Maltese woman. He soon became one of the leading photographers on the island. Ellis was active in multiple genres of photography, including views, portraits and society photography. He was also proficient in developing, editing, printing, mounting and frame-making. Later on Ellis also dealt in photographic equipment.

His work is renowned both for its historical value and also its technical quality. Ellis' clients included King George V of the United Kingdom, King Albert I of Belgium, the German emperor, the queen of Portugal and various other European royals or nobles. His work has been featured in a number of publications, including in a 1920 issue of the National Geographic magazine and many post-humous publications. He was awarded several medals and trophies at exhibitions.

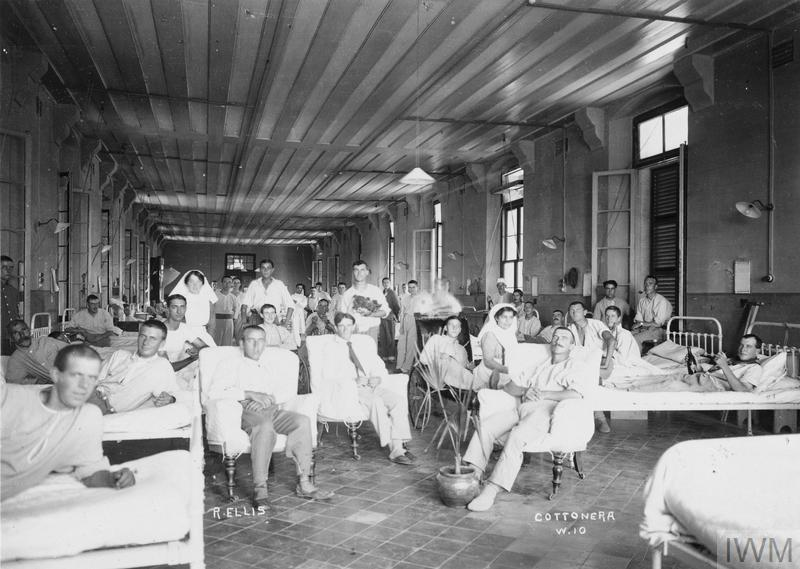
Cottonera Military Hospital Ward 10, photographed by Ellis during World War I

Throughout his decades-long career, Ellis created an archive of around 36,000 to 45,000 photographs, which document Malta's history during the last few decades of the 19th century and the first two decades of the 20th century. These record buildings, views and events, and they also show social change.

== Other work and personal life ==
Ellis also tutored at the Malta Society of Arts, Manufactures and Commerce. He was a member of the organizing committee of the 24th International Eucharistic Congress held in 1913.

At the age of 22, Ellis married Alfonsina Curmi, a Maltese woman from Cospicua. They had a son named John. and two daughters, Amelia and Mary.

Ellis is buried at the cemetery of Santa Maria Addolorata ("Our Lady of Sorrows") in Paola, which is Malta's largest graveyard.

== Legacy ==
After Ellis' death, his photography business was taken over by his son John until 1931, and eventually by his grandson Richard Jr until 1993. The focus of the firm moved from photography to frame-making in the 1990s. The business then passed to Richard Jr's nephew Ian Ellis, whose focus has been on maintaining the photography archive. Ian Ellis has published books showcasing Richard Ellis' photos, and he wants to establish a photography museum in Malta, aided by curator and photographic historian Dr Charles Paul Azzopardi.
