= Salvatore Psaila =

Maltese sculptor (1798–1871)

Salvatore Psaila (1798–1871) was a Maltese sculptor.
