= Gabriel Caruana =

Maltese artist, sculptor and ceramicist

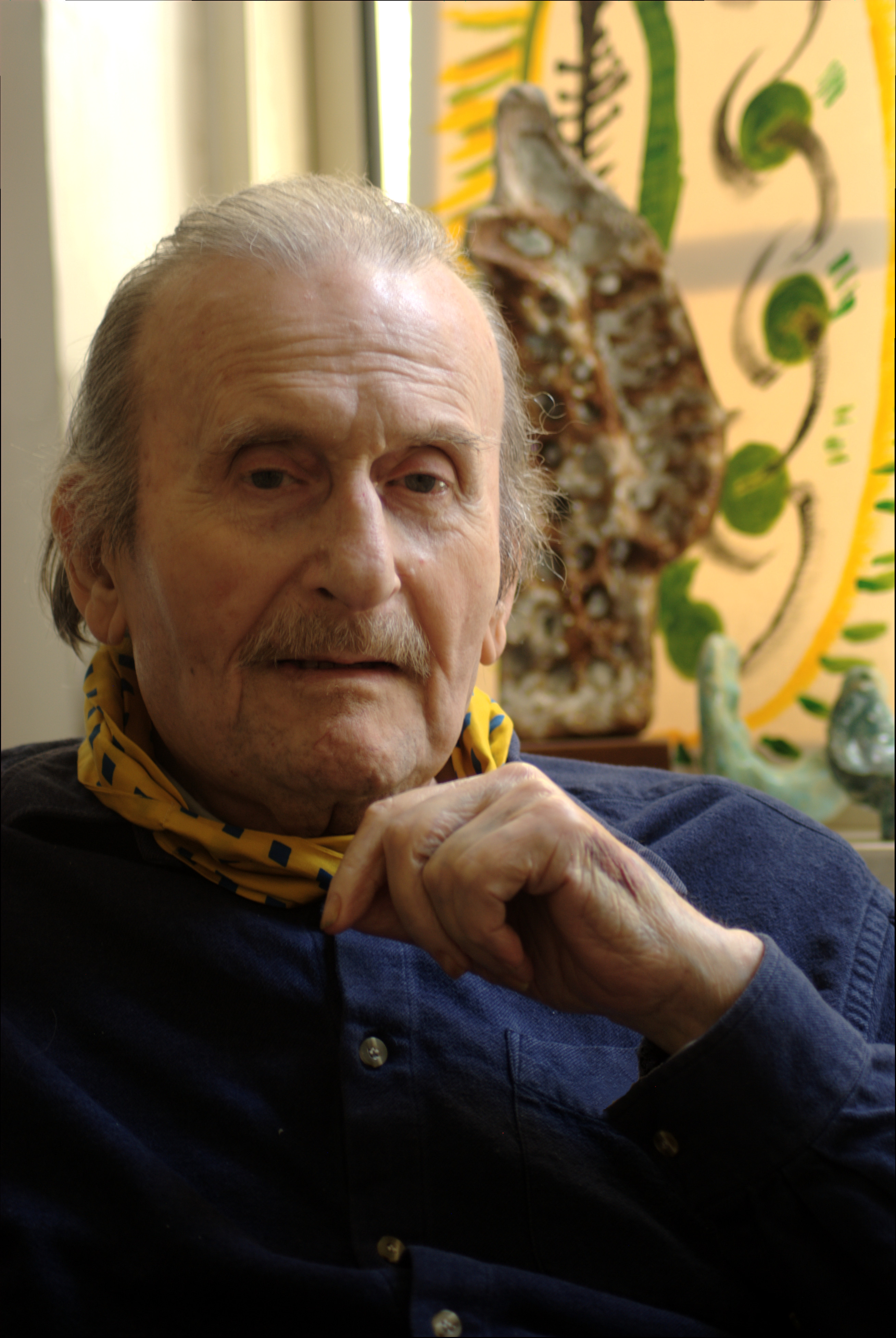
- Born: 7 April 1929; Balzan, Crown Colony of Malta
- Died: 16 July 2018 (aged 89)
- Education: Malta Government School of Art
- Known for: Sculpture, ceramics, painting
- Notable work: Neolithic Doorway, 1975
- Spouse: Mary Rose Buttigieg
- Website: http://www.gabrielcaruana.com/

Gabriel Caruana (7 April 1929 – 16 July 2018) was a Maltese artist who worked primarily in ceramics. He studied at the Malta School of Art (1953–59), the Accademia Pietro Vannucci in Perugia (1965), the School of the Detroit Society of Arts and Crafts (1966) and the Istituto Statale per la Ceramica in Faenza (1967).

He exhibited internationally, including a group exhibit by Maltese artists at Hunter College in 1996, and at venues such as the head office lobby of the Bank of Valletta.

== Early life and education ==
Caruana was born in Balzan, Malta on 7 April 1929. He was the son of Anthony Caruana, Malta Police Force sergeant and Beatrice Ebejer Michelizzi. He studied sculpture at the Malta Government School of Arts in the classes of George Borg, Emvin Cremona and Vincent Apap.

== Art and career ==
Caruana was a pioneer of modern art in Malta, drawing inspiration from popular art traditions and the architecture of the Island.

Caruana held solo exhibitions in Malta, England, Italy and Switzerland and showed his work in group exhibitions in Osaka, Detroit, Munich, Tripoli, London, Israel, Melbourne, and several times in Malta. His works can be found at the International Museum of Ceramics of Faenza, at the Whitworth Art Gallery, Manchester, at City of Manchester Art Gallery, and, at the National Museum of Fine Arts Malta. Two works of Caruana were sold at international auctions - Sans Titre was sold at Beaussant & Lefevre in Paris in 2008 and Untitled was sold at Christie's, London in 2013.

In 1952 Caruana, with St. Gabriel Band Club of Ħal Balzan, took part in the National Carnival Festivities in Valletta, winning all honours in float, dance and costumes.

Between 1971 and 1990 he was a ceramics teacher at the School of Arts and Crafts at Tarġa Gap, Mosta, Malta, which was renamed Malta College of Arts, Science and Technology in 2001. When he retired in 1990 he was succeeded at the school by Tony Briffa.

In 1990, he set up an Arts, Culture and Crafts Centre at Ta' Ganu Windmill in Birkirkara, Malta, with his wife, Mary Rose Caruana.

He died on 16 July 2018, aged 89.

== Personal life ==
In 1980 he married Mary Rose Buttigieg, an English and Art teacher and artist. The couple had two daughters; Gabriella and Raffaella born respectively in 1981 and 1983.
