= Philip Tortell =

Maltese architect (1869–1937)

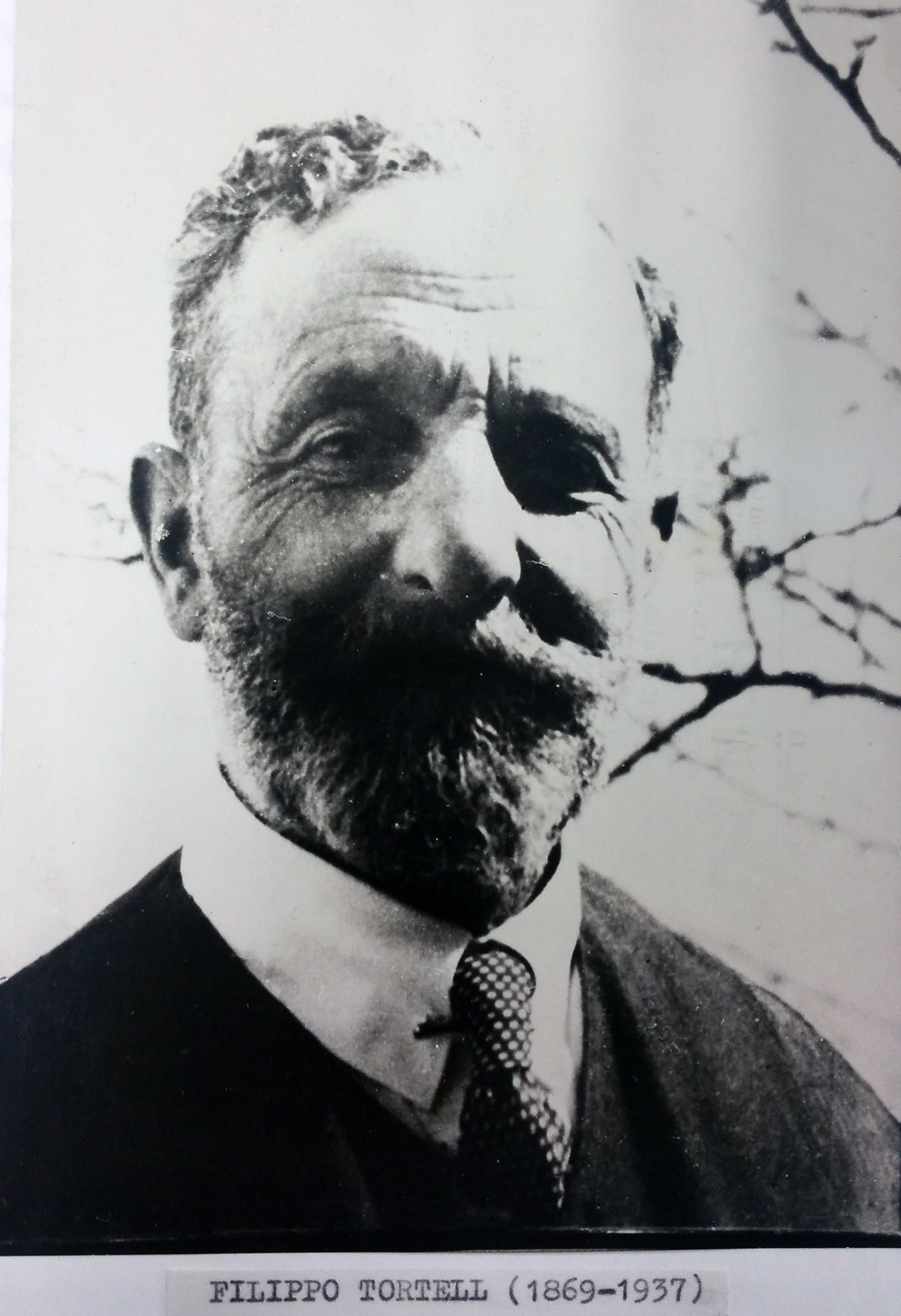

Philip or Filippo Tortell (1869–1937) was a Maltese architect born in Valletta on 12 December 1869, son of Augusto Alessandro Tortell and of Camilla Montanaro.

In the 1920s he designed a series of terraced houses in Palm Street, Paola. Tortell built three private residences for wealthy Dr Filippo Nicolò Buttigieg, a Maltese lawyer with extensive travel experience to Europe: in Main Street, Balzan; in Tigné Street, Sliema (signed by Giuseppe Psaila); and Villa Madama, Attard (1925). According to Mark G. Muscat, "Villa Madama shows clear indication of similarities to Frank Lloyd Wright's motifs, particularly in the interior. On the other hand, the house in Tigné Street is reminiscent of the style of Louis Sullivan's handling of façade decoration". According to Edward Said, Tortell "designed buildings on corner of St. Anthony Street and Tigne’ Street without any floral motifs. It has been suggested that he drew inspiration from contemporary American star architect Frank Lloyd Wright"

The ‘Maronna’, ‘Licinia’ and ‘Lavinia’ houses in Qui-Si-Sana, Sliema are also of Tortell's design, "of a unique type of Art Deco architecture designed by Filippo Tortell in the early 1930s". Their Italian-sounding names are deemed to have been in defiance to British colonial authorities. The ‘Maronna’ townhouse was proposed for demolition in 2018 by developer Keith Attard Portughes. The destruction of the whole complex was approved by the planning tribunal in January 2023.

Tortell also authored the Basilica of Christ the King in Paola, Malta.

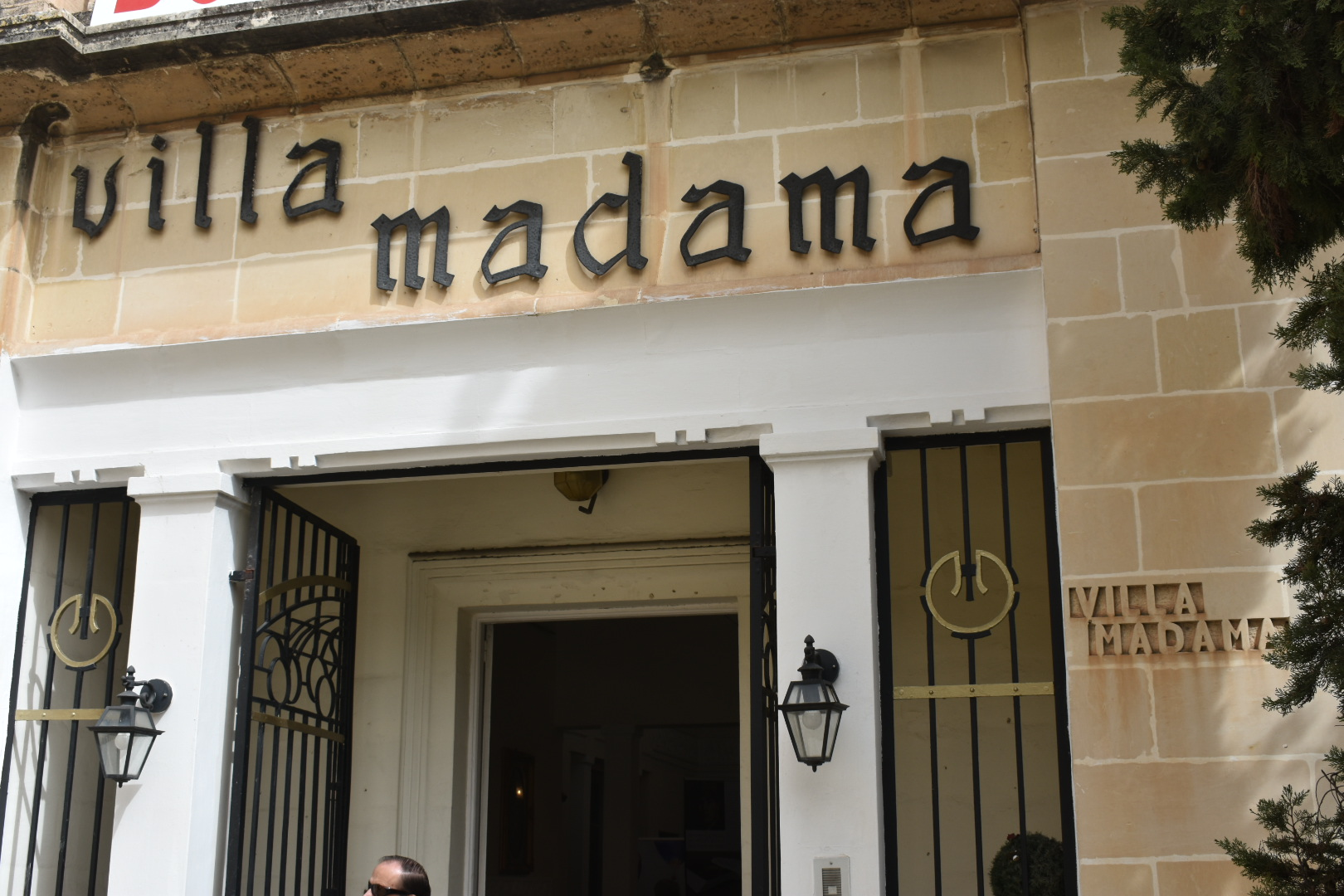
Villa Madama in Attard

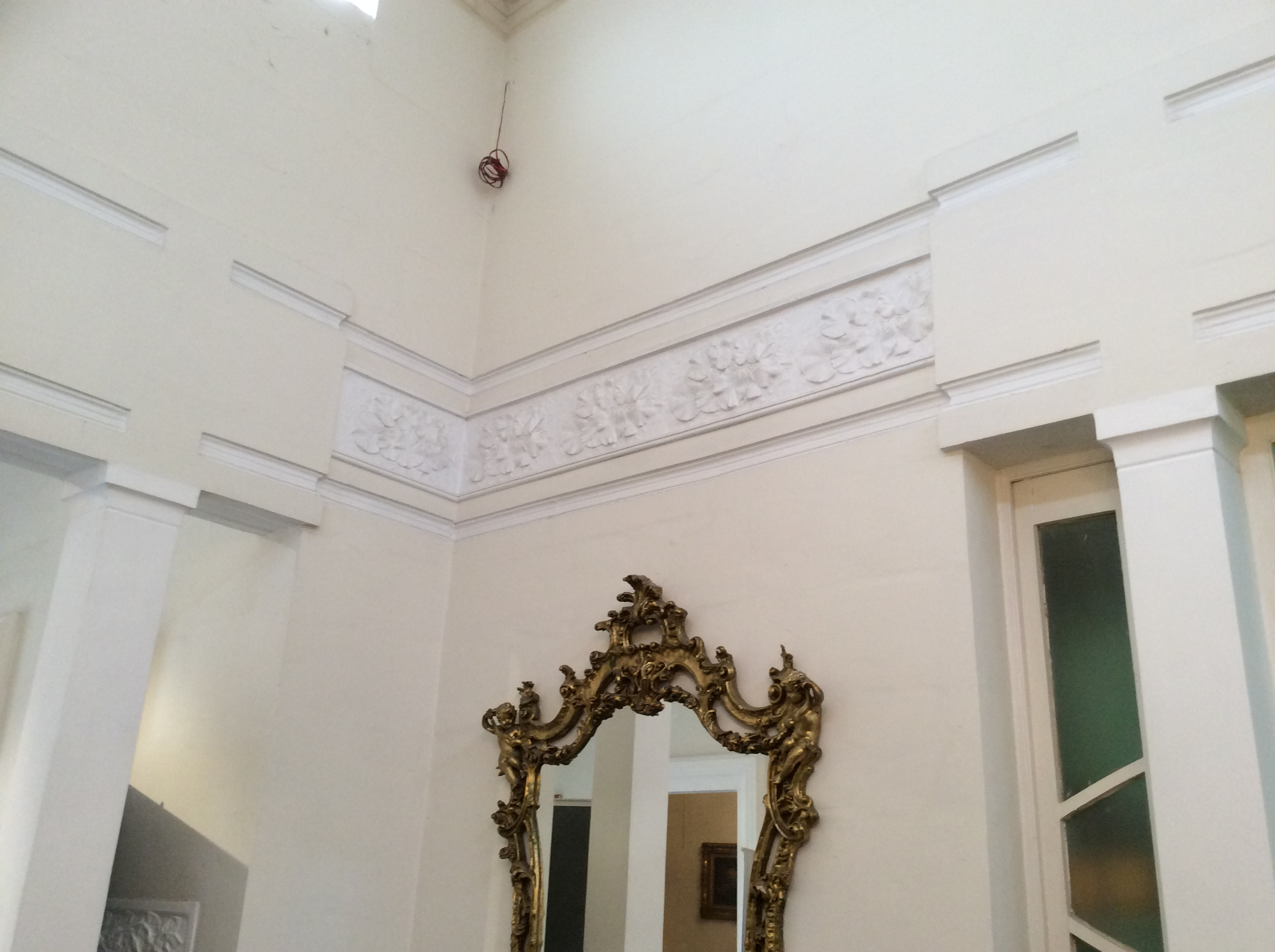
Interior of Villa Madama

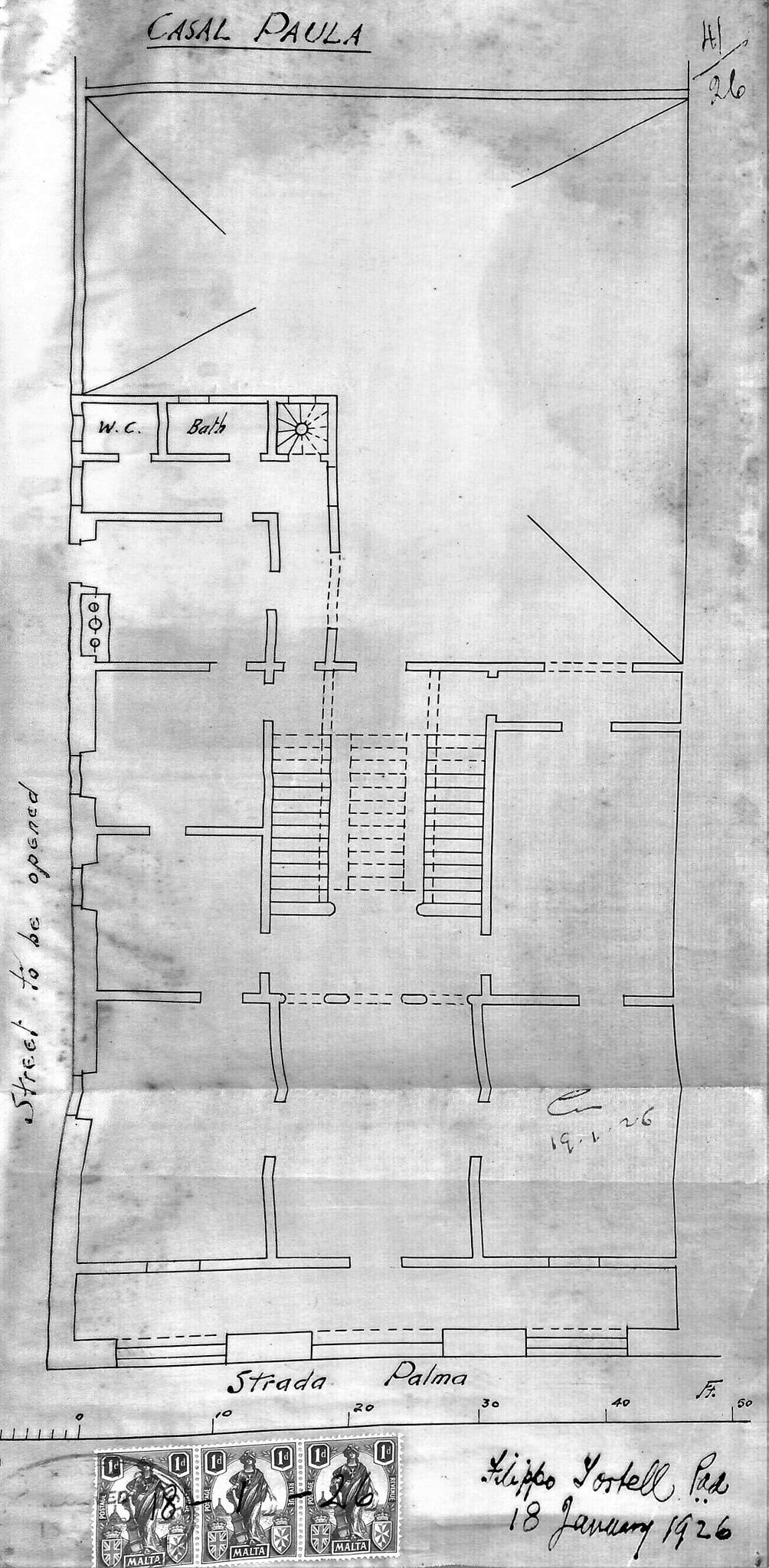
Project for Palm Street, Paola
