= Tony Briffa (artist) =

Maltese artist (born 1959)

Tony Briffa (born 1959) is a Maltese artist currently living and working in Denmark since 2002.

== Education ==
Following his studies in Malta in the late 1970s in drawing, painting and ceramics, Briffa was awarded the Commonwealth Foundation Fellowship in Arts & Crafts in 1995. One of his mentors was Maltese ceramic artist Gabriel Caruana. Other mentors throughout his career include Les Blakebrough (Australia), Peter Callas (USA), Nina Hole (Denmark), Robin Hopper (Canada), Janet Mansfield (Australia), Fred Olsen (USA).

Briffa was a visiting scholar at the School of Creative Arts, University of Tasmania in Australia and also taught ceramics at the School of Arts and Crafts at Tarġa Gap, Mosta, Malta, which was renamed Malta College of Arts, Science and Technology in 2001.
