= Agriculture in Malta =

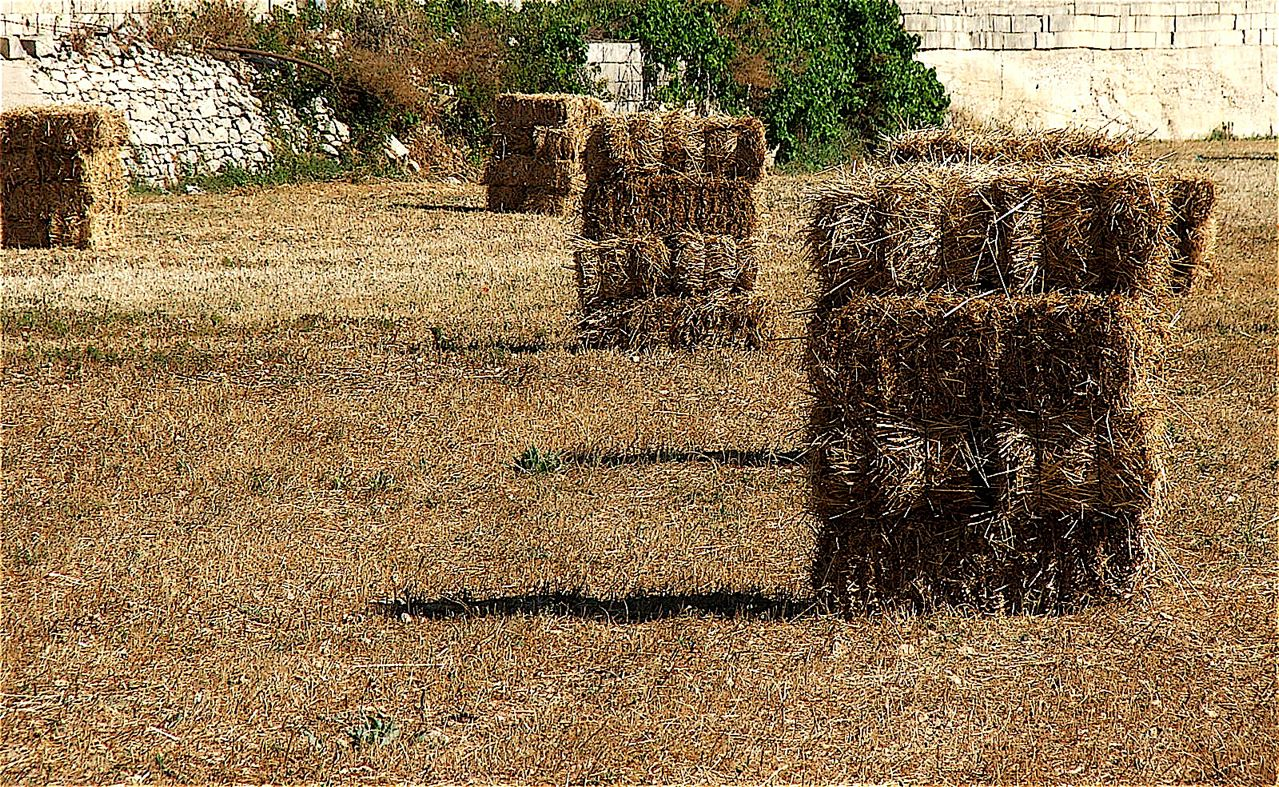
Straw bales in a Maltese field

Agriculture constitutes a relatively small part of the economy of Malta, an island country of 316 square kilometres (122 sq mi). The economy is largely industrialised and service-based; the agriculture, forestry and fishing sector represents 0.7% of the GDP and employs around 1.1% of the workforce as of May 2025. Alongside limited arable land, small-scale operations including fruit fields and vineyards make up the majority of farms. However, farming plays a significant role in local livelihoods, and cultural preservation. The sector faces challenges related to scale and competitiveness as well as limited fresh water supplies and scarce energy sources, but has diversified in crops and production methods. In terms of food security, Malta produces less than a quarter of its food needs.

It is regulated by the Ministry for Agriculture, Fisheries and Animal Rights, headed by the minister Anton Refalo. The Agriculture and Rural Payments Agency and Agricultural Bioresources Agency are both government agencies under that ministry.

== Farming ==
Maltese agriculture is dominated by small and micro-holdings, often fragmented into small parcels. Often these are run part-time by people for whom it is not their main source of income.

According to the European Commission, more than 300,000 people live in rural areas of Malta, and there are more than 10,400 farms in Malta, 90% of which are less than 2 hectares (4.9 acres) in size. The total agricultural area of Malta is 10,700 hectares (26,000 acres). Between 2010 and 2020, there has been a decrease of 16.2% in the number of agricultural holdings, 6.2% decrease in utilised agricultural area, and the agricultural labour force declined by 26.7%.

Many crops are seasonal with diverse outputs throughout the year. The main crops produced are wheat, olives, potatoes, green peppers, citrus, cauliflower, tomatoes, barley, and grapes. In the irrigated areas, higher-value vegetable crops, including melons, tomatoes and artichokes, are grown. Harvesting is usually done manually, rather than mechanically, due to the small size of the arable land available.

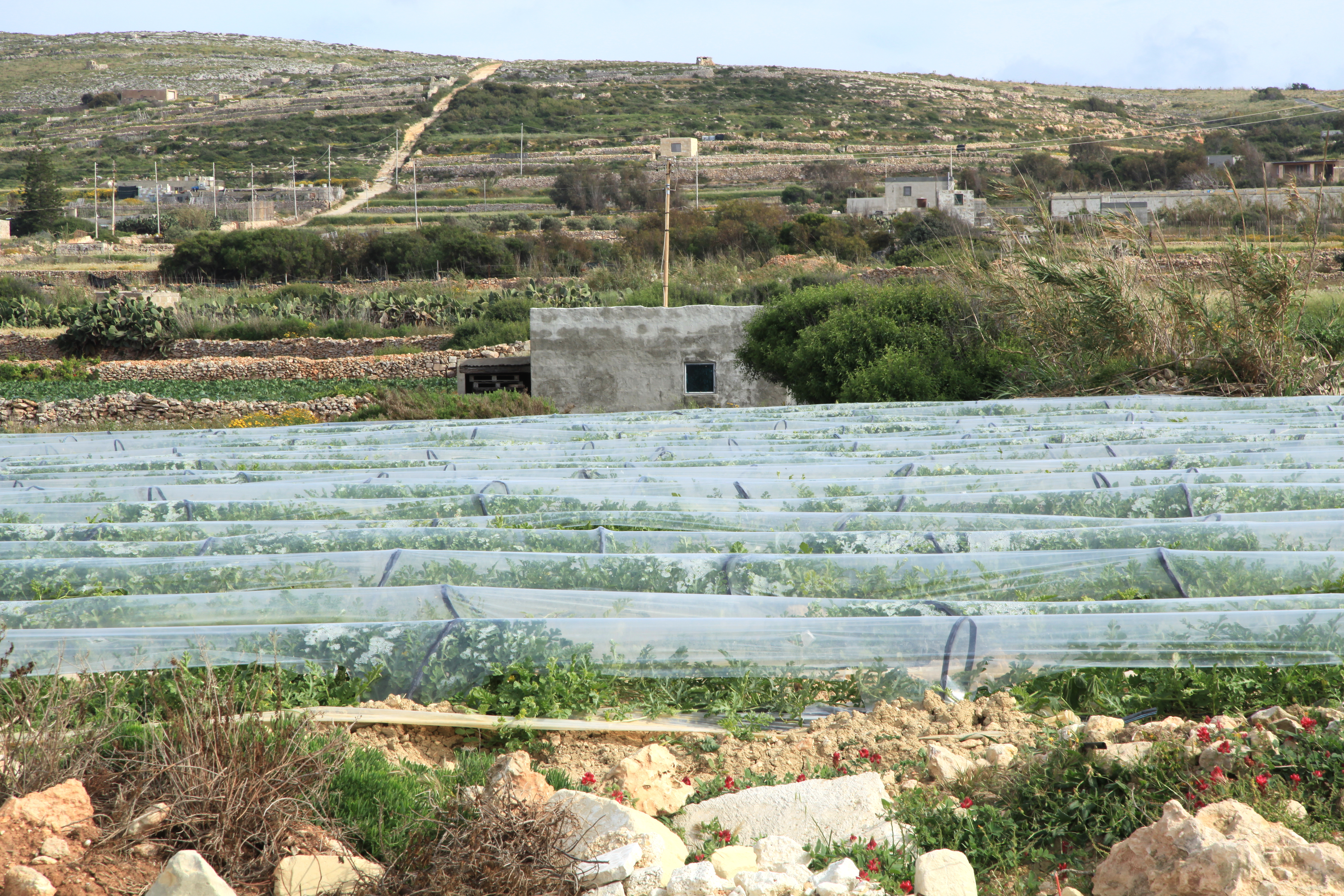
Polytunnels used for food production in Mellieħa

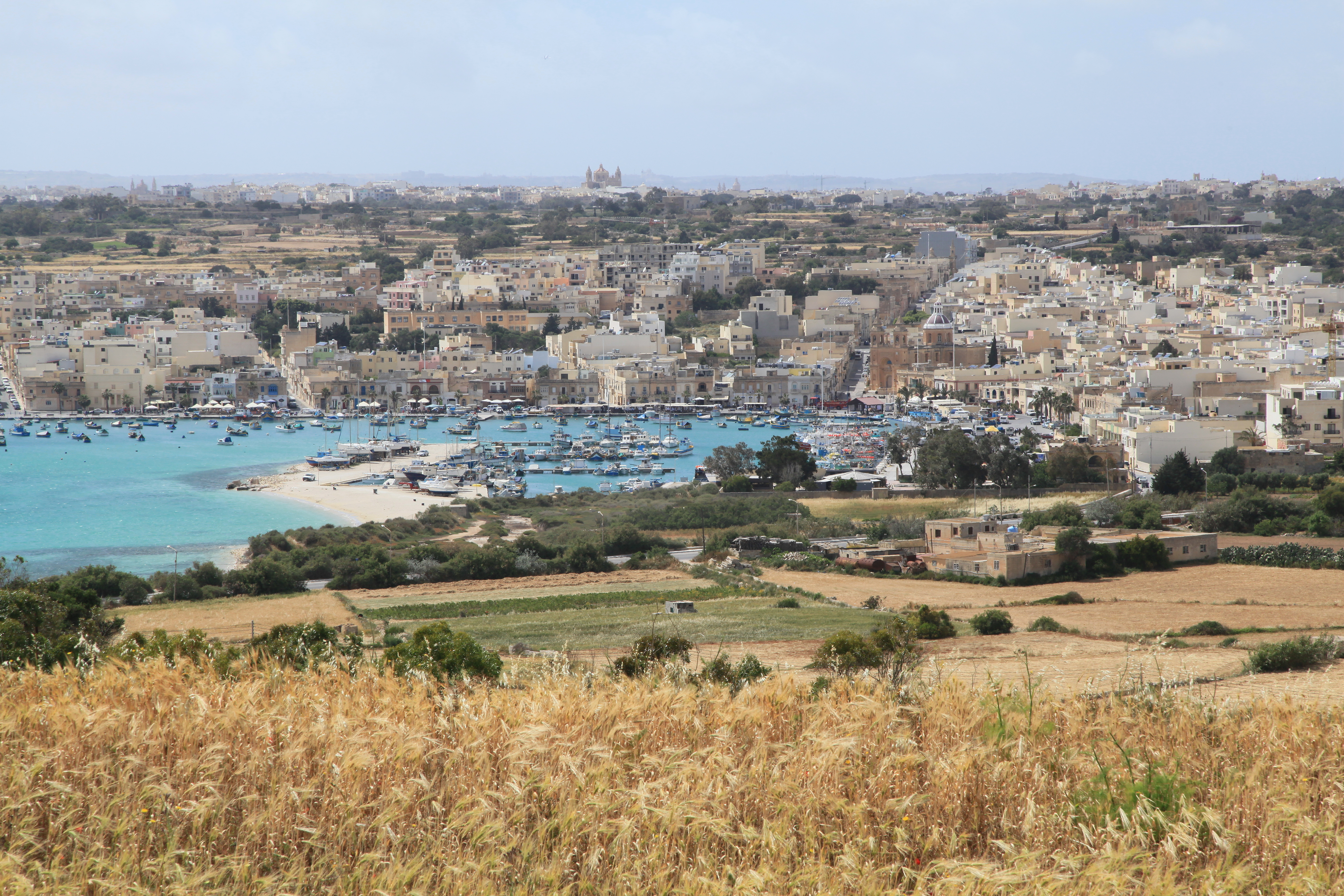
Wheat field above Marsaxlokk bay

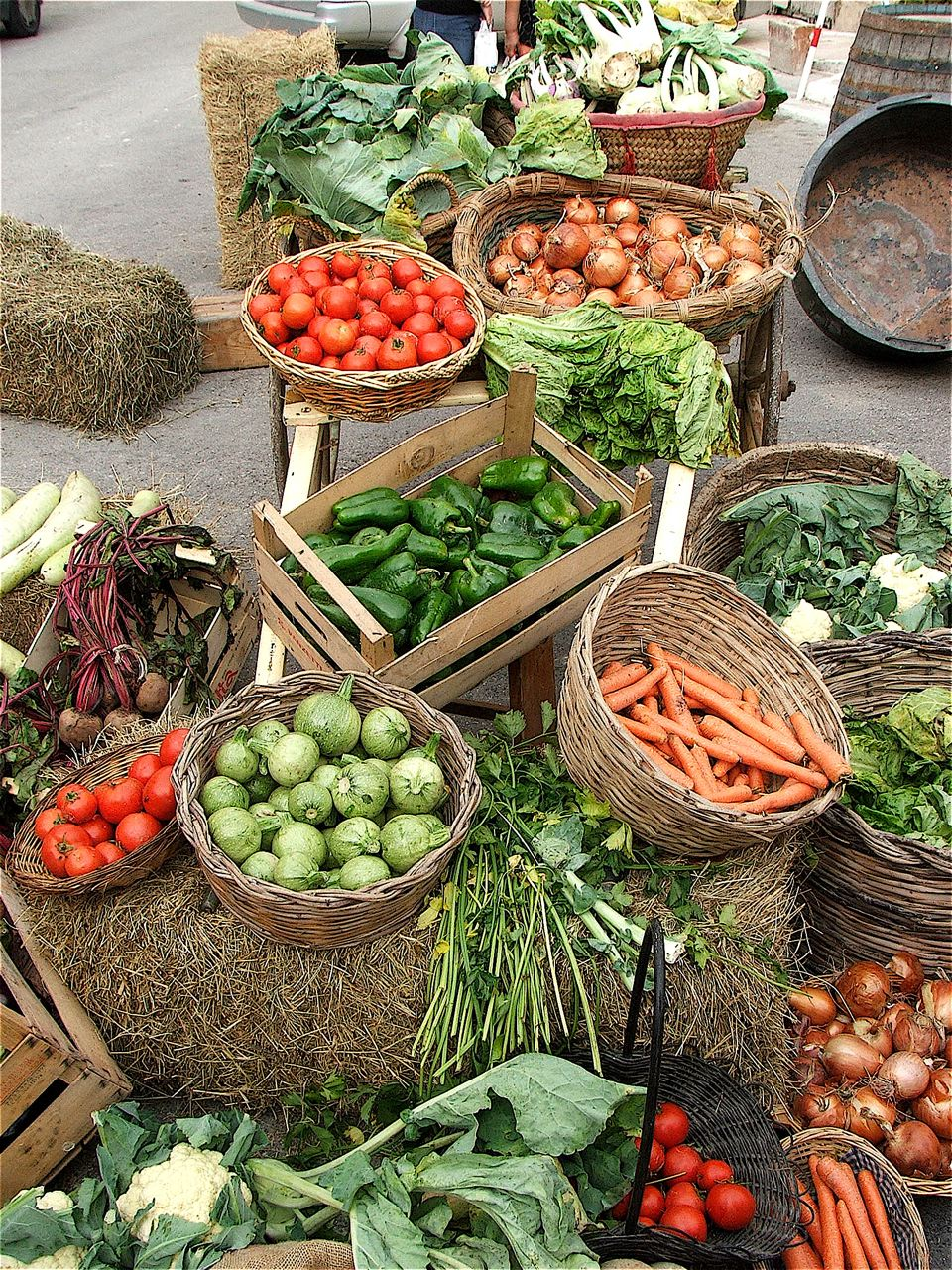
Vegetables produced at a local farm in Malta

=== Innovation ===
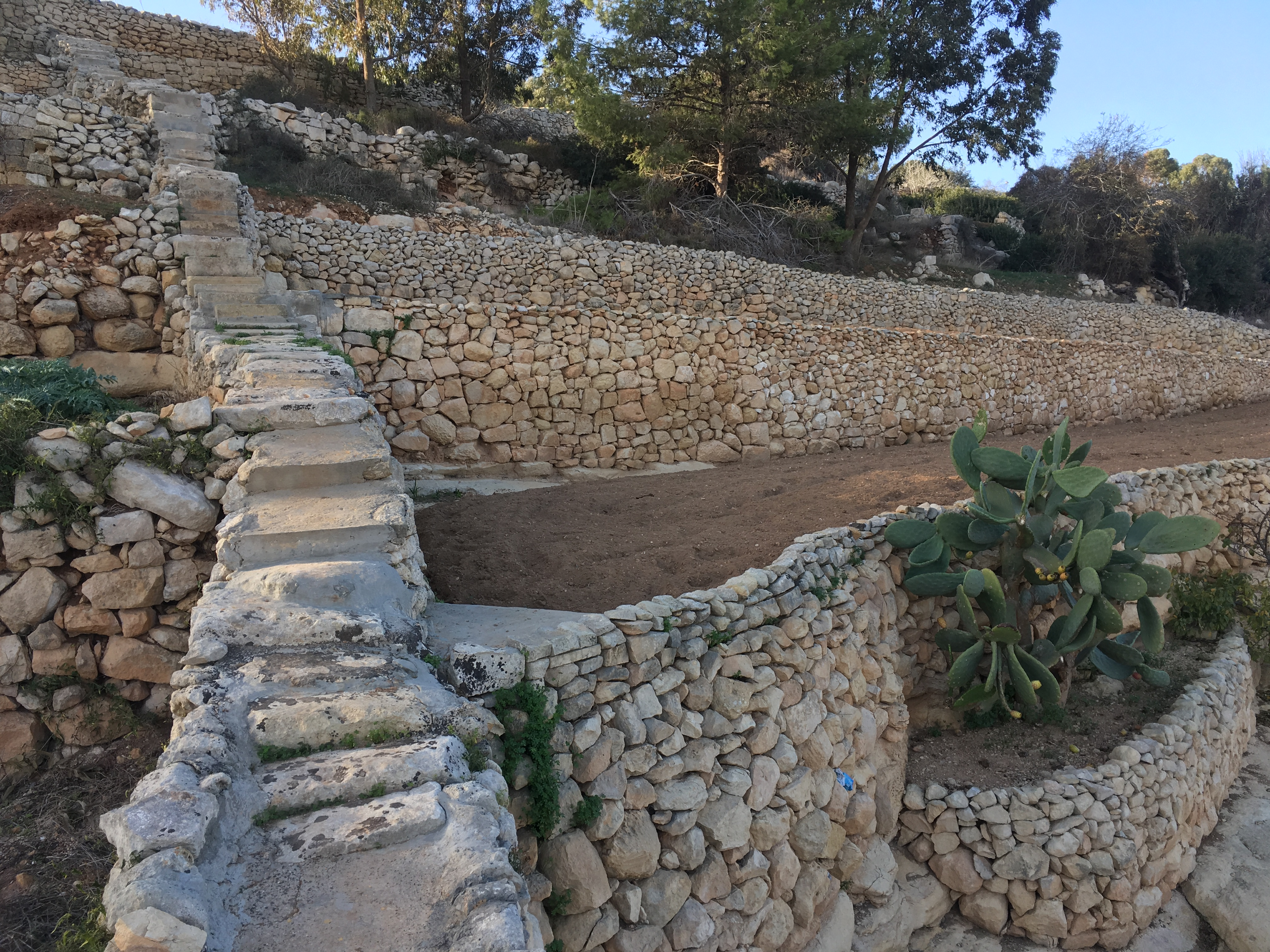
Traditional dry-stone walling in the Għargħur valley forming the distinctive agricultural terrace or campi artificiali

Natural geology, hydrology and soils have long presented a challenge to farming on Malta's landscape. Maltese farmers have made use of techniques such as rainwater harvesting and passive irrigation due to the lack of available fresh water and arid environment. Most of the land is rain-fed with no major watercourses on the islands. Eco-agrarian adaptations have been in evidence since at least the early Roman occupation period.

- Man-made soils - Historical sources from the 19th century note the tendency of the Maltese to translocate soils and create new soil to turn barren rock into productive fields. By crushing the soft limestone found in bedrock and mixing it with suitable substrates and organic matter, such as animal manure and organic human waste, an artificial soil could be created which was of sufficient nutritional value to yield crops after two to three years.
- Rainwater harvesting – archaeological research has hypothesised water was gathered in the 12th to 13th centuries by man-excavated perennial spring sources and the employment of terraced cultivation irrigated by gravity-fed water systems. A network of stone canals and animal-lifted water lifting devices were employed to channel water to underground holding reservoirs.
- Passive irrigation – The Globigerina limestone which underlies Malta is soft and will absorb and retain water – up to a quarter of its weight in water in 24 hours. While this is challenging when using the stone as a construction material, it is useful for agriculture as an intricate capillary network channels water upwards against gravity. It became a common practice from the 19th century to create ridges and furrowss in the rock, at intervals, 2–5 cm deep, before being covered with the man-made soil. Roots would then access the moisture in those channels from the porous rock, and in combination with dew, provide enough water to yield the crops without any formal irrigation.
- Cultivated hills - also known as campi artificiali. The construction of stone walls to form a series of small, narrow terraced fields to protect against erosion and the intrusion of livestock.

=== Farmhouses ===
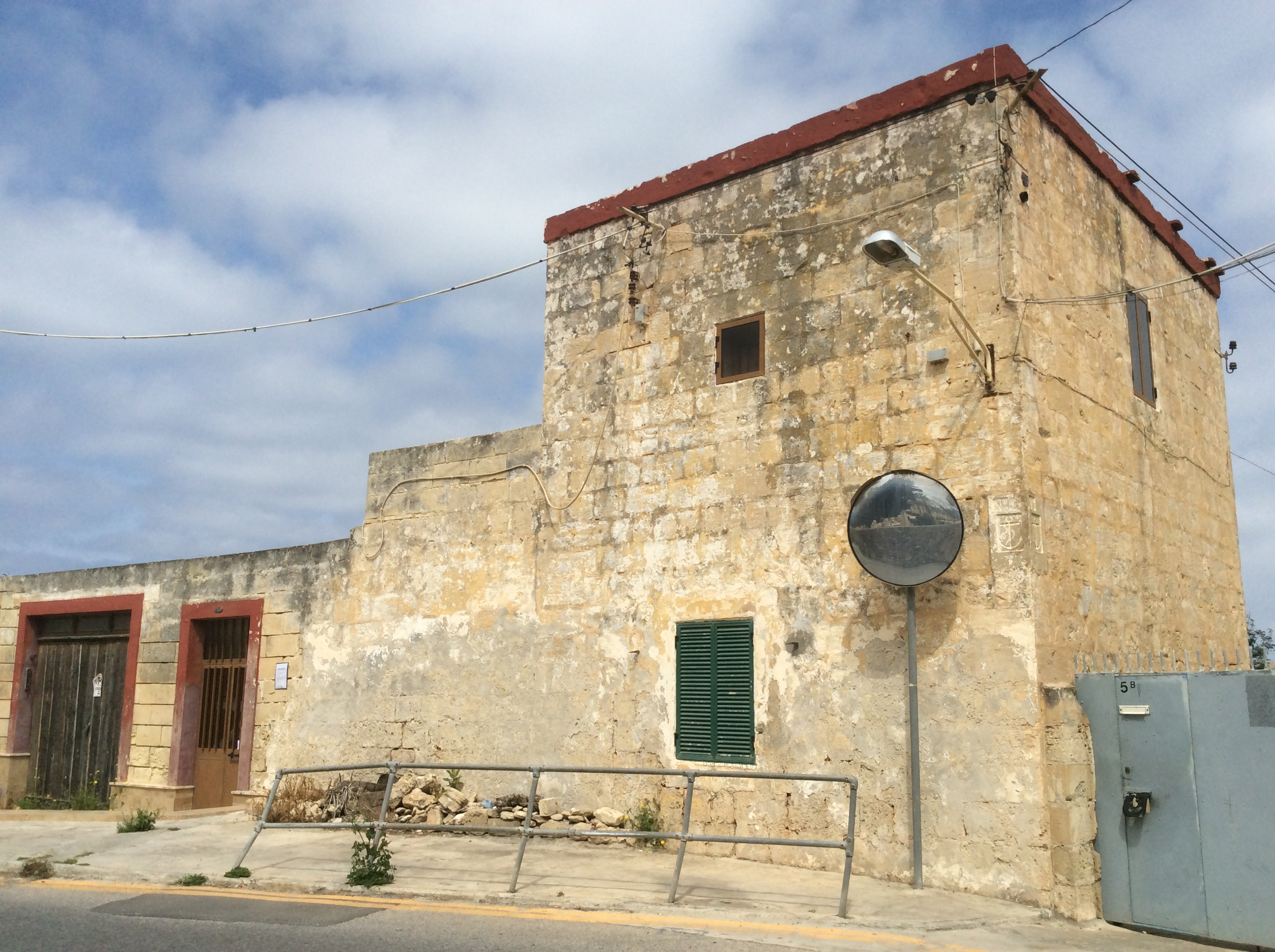
Typical farmhouse found in the Maltese Islands

The Gozo farmhouse, or razzett, is a type of dwelling found in Gozo, featuring distinctive cubic architecture. They developed around 1600, linked with the typically medieval Mediterranean tradition of walking to one's fields in the early morning.

There are several notable former 18th-century farmhouses, including The Devil's Farmhouse (Ir-Razzett tax-Xitan) in Mellieħa, the Ta' Xindi Farmhouse in San Ġwann, both scheduled by the Malta Environment and Planning Authority as Grade 1 National Monuments, and the Ta' Cisju Farmhouse in Naxxar. The Villa St Ignatius in St. Julian's was also originally part of a country estate, with its surrounding fields used for agricultural experimentation.

== Animals ==
The Maltese donkey and Pharaoh Hound (Kelb tal-Fenek) originated in Malta. The donkey is critically endangered, though used to be used for carrying loads, while the Kelb tal-Fenek is still kept by Maltese farmers for hunting and sport. Additionally, the Maltese goat is kept for dairy production.

Animal husbandry is carried out with cattle (approximately 14,000), goats (5,700) and sheep (16,000) for milk and cheese, pigs (40,000), poultry – including the Black Maltese chicken – (545,000 broilers and 338,500 laying hens), and bees for honey and pollination (3,600 hives). 330 million rabbits are consumed every year, with Malta being one of the top consumers; the traditional stew Stuffat tal-Fenek is the national dish of Malta. 7,326 breeding female rabbits were being reared by 478 agricultural holdings in 2020.

The Malta National Statistics Office reports that the total livestock population decreased by 23.6% from 41,652 in 2010 to 31,825 in 2020.

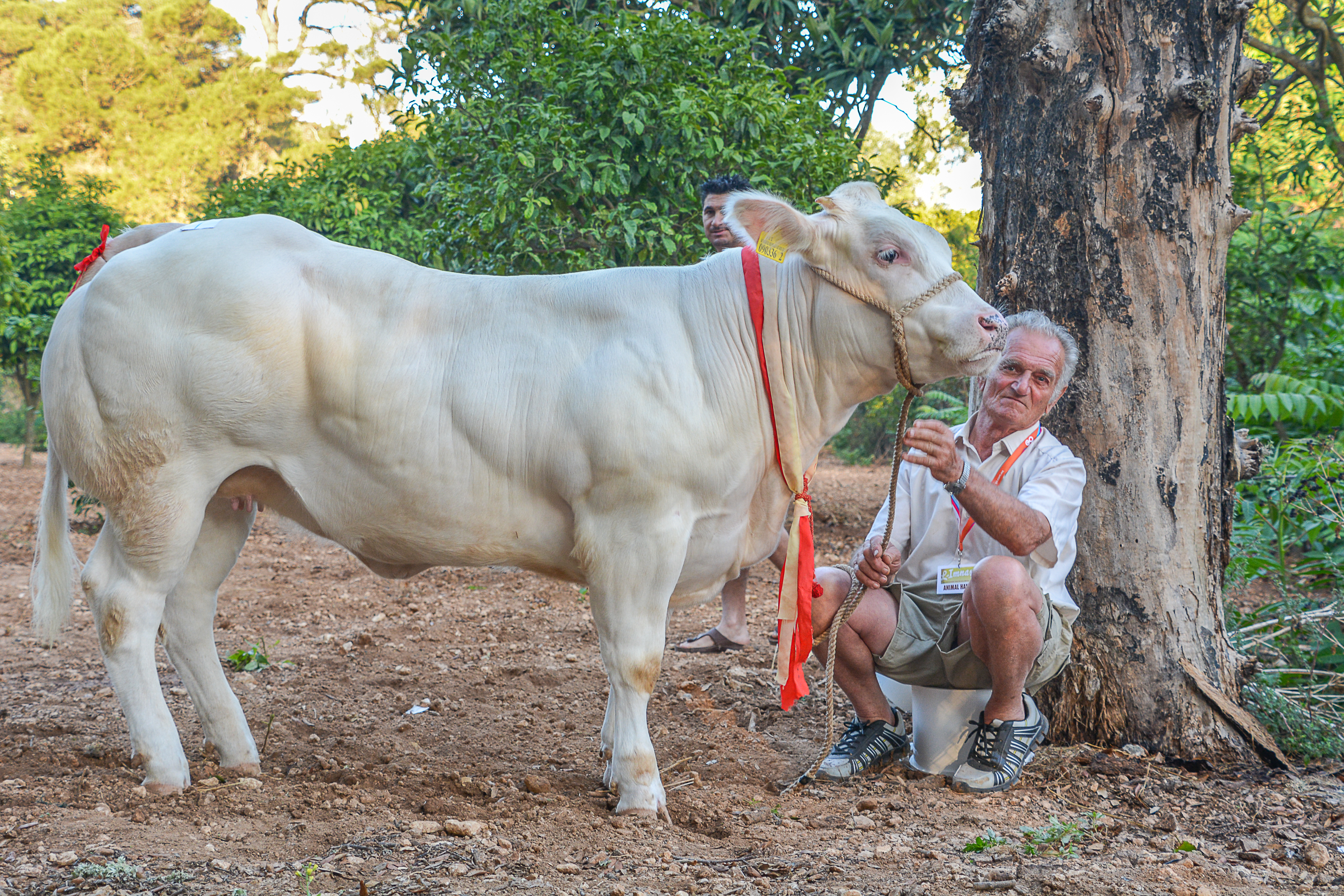
Show cow at Buskett, Rabat

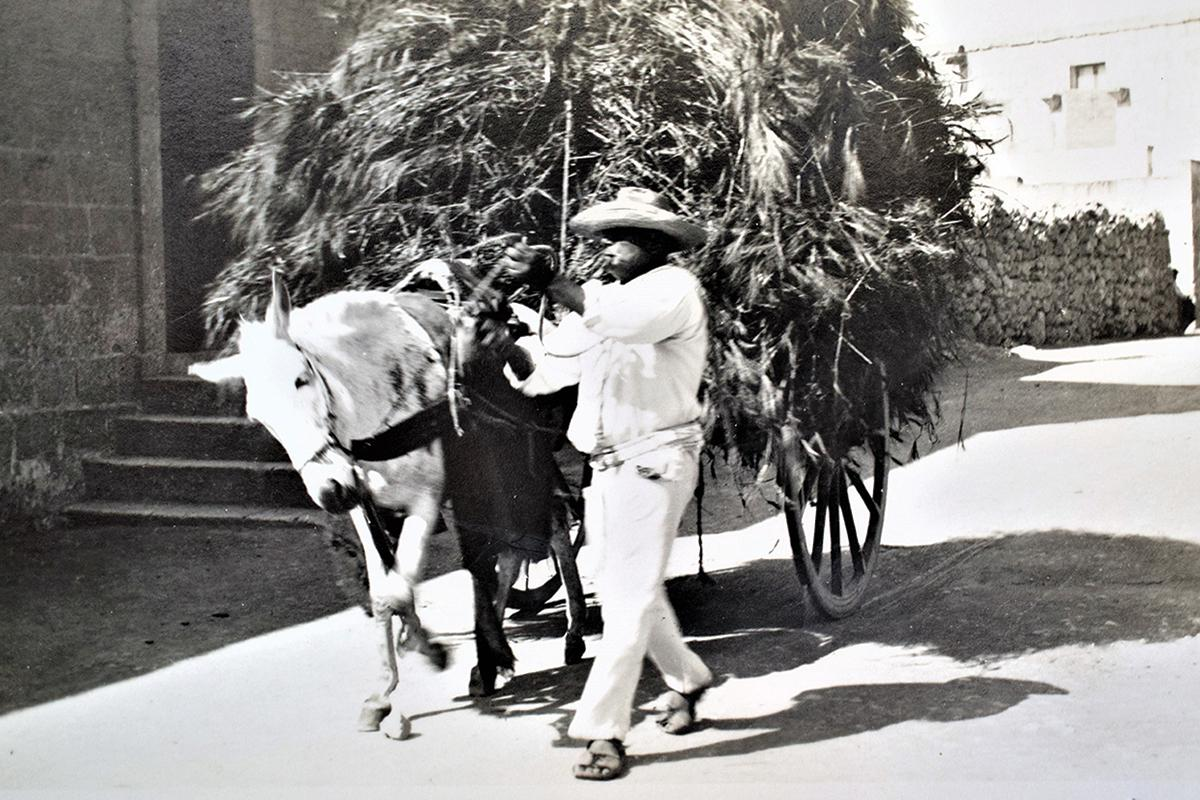
Maltese donkey carting wheat (1910)

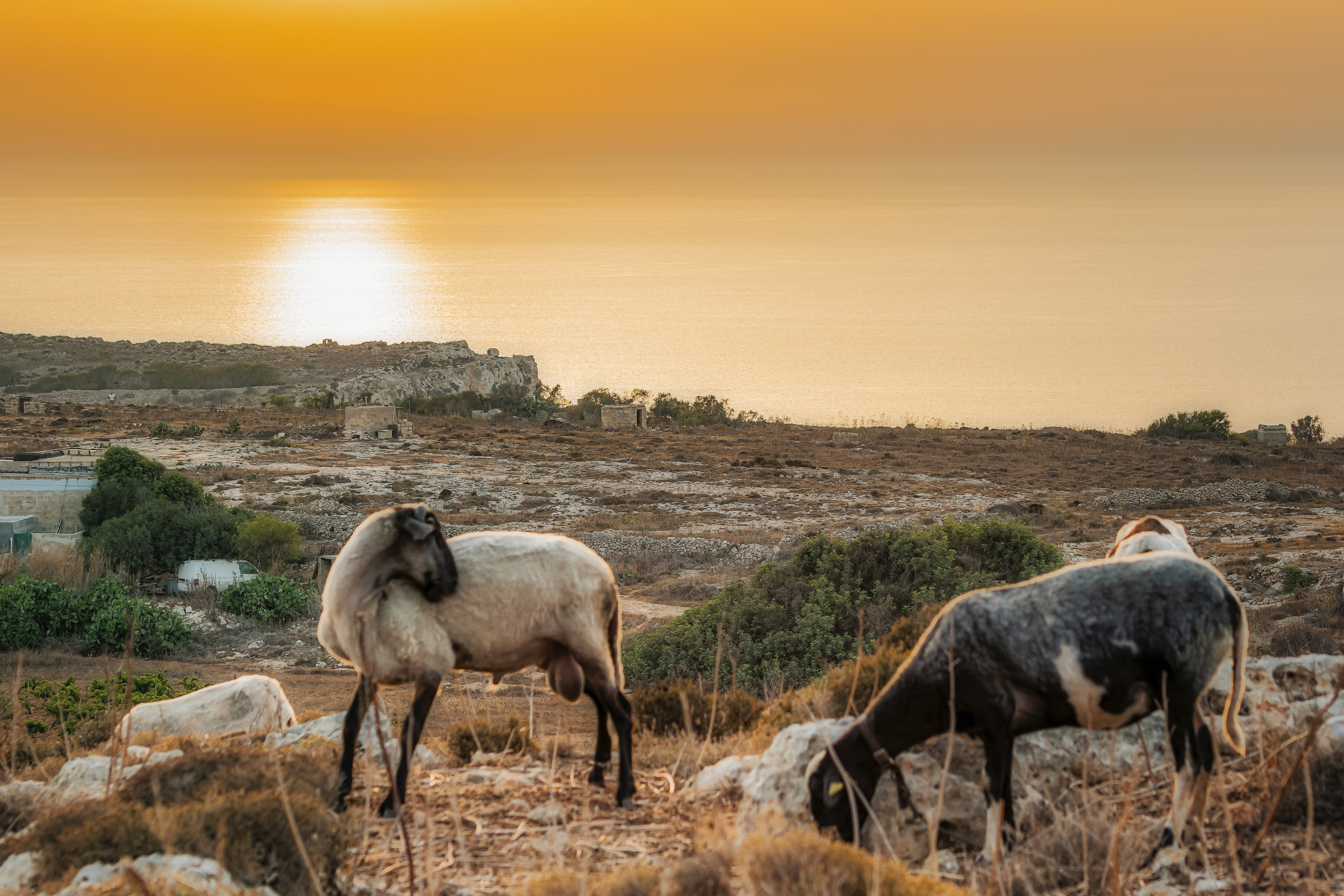
Sheep grazing at Bahrija

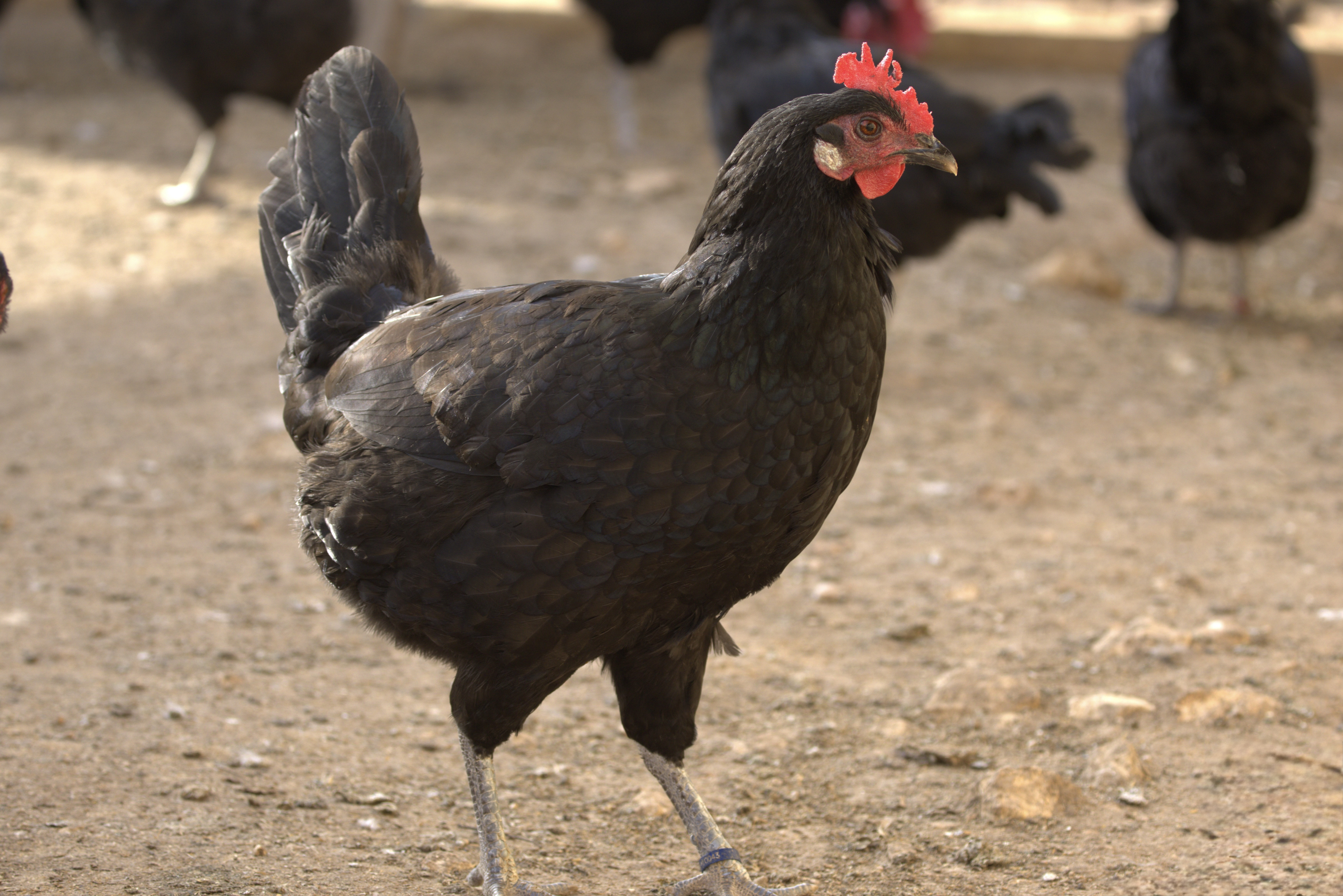
Maltese Black chicken

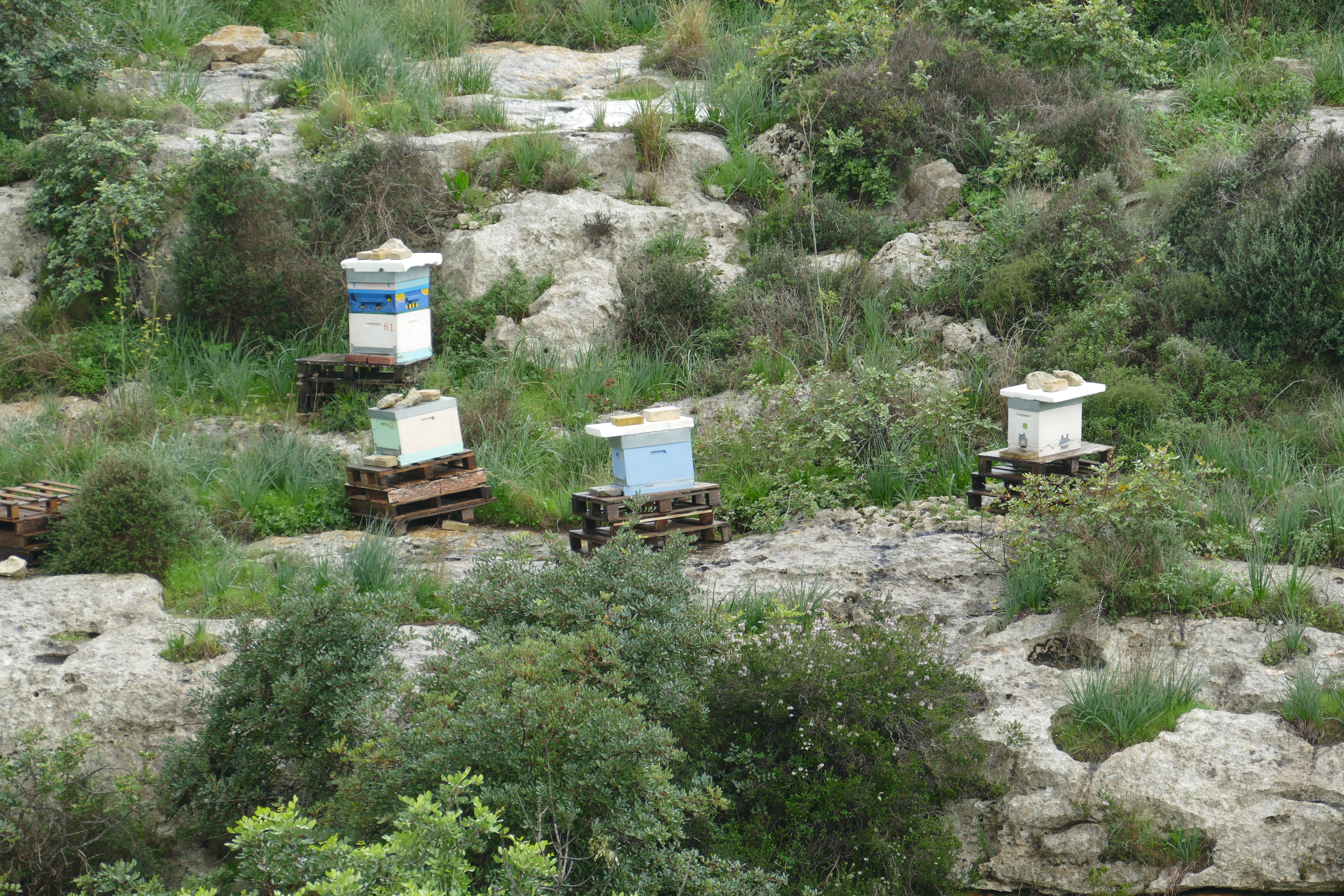
Beehives at Għar Dalam cave

== Wineries ==
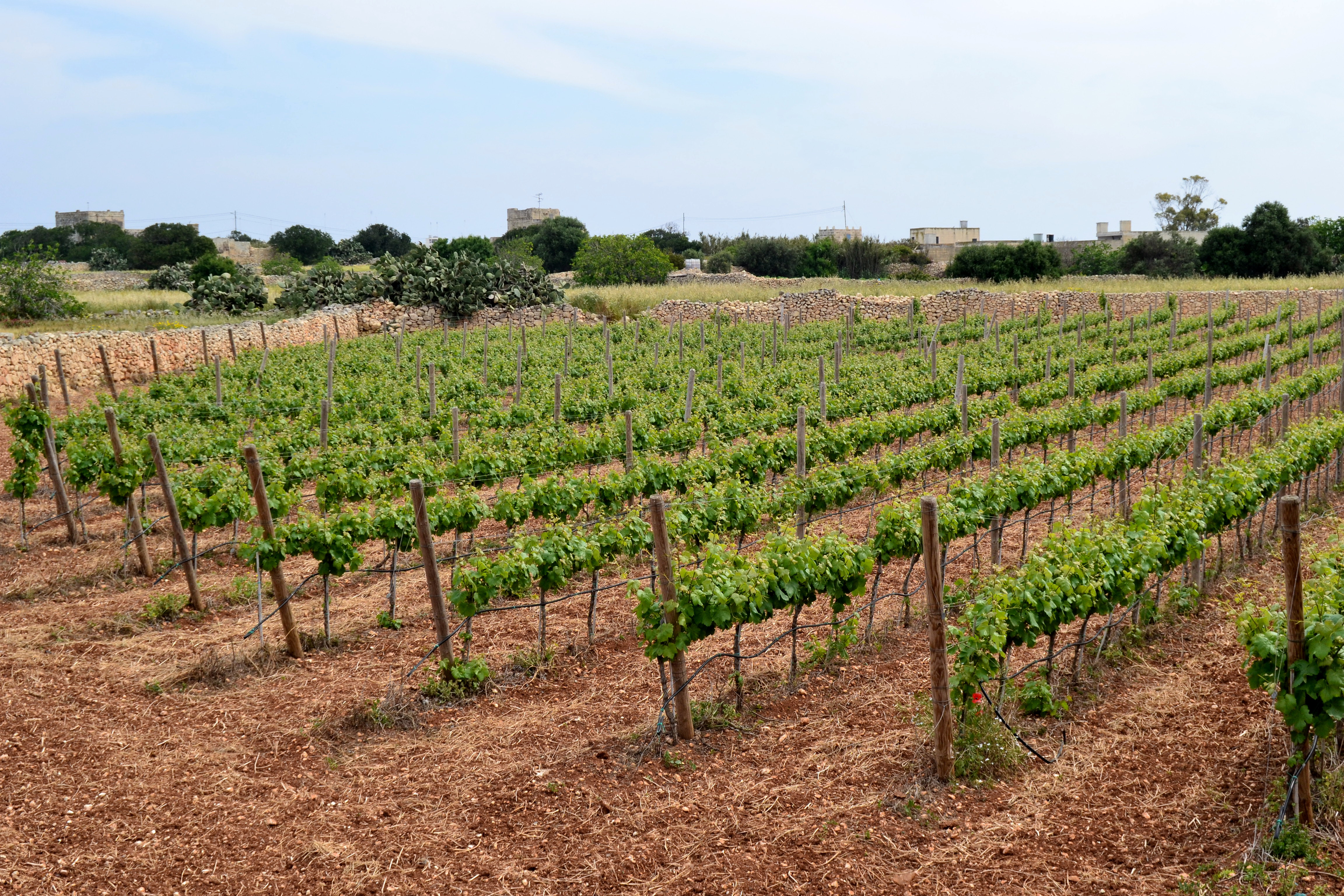
Vineyards near Żejtun, Malta

The Emmanuel Delicata and Marsovin wineries are located in Malta, founded in 1907 and 1919 respectively.

Malta has three officially recognized quality wines: DOK Malta, DOK Gozo, and IĠT Maltese Islands. The acronym DOK represents the Maltese term Denominazzjoni ta’ l-Oriġini Kontrollata, which signifies that these quality wines are crafted from grapes cultivated on the respective islands of Malta or Gozo, adhering to rigorous production standards in both the vineyard and the winery. Among the grape varieties grown for DOK Malta and DOK Gozo are Girgentina, Ġellewża – which are both indigenous – Chardonnay, Cabernet Franc, Syrah, Cabernet Sauvignon, Vermentino, and Merlot. In contrast, IĠT Maltese Islands refers to quality wines produced under less stringent regulations than DOK.

== Fishing ==
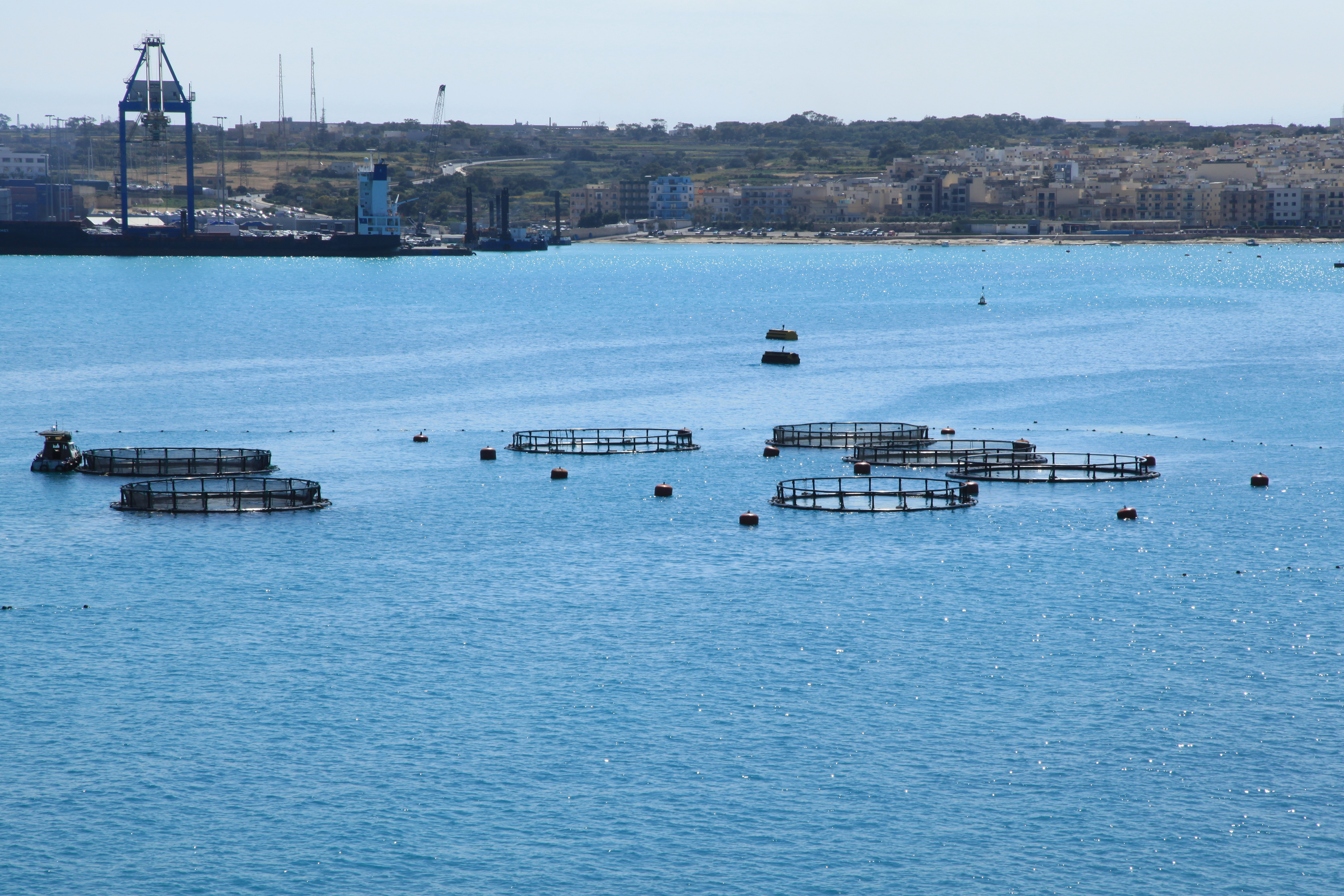
Fish farms near Birżebbuġa

The Food and Agriculture Organization estimates the Maltese fishing industry as equivalent to about 0.1% of the national gross domestic product (GDP), with about 0.07% of the European Union's annual fish catch coming from Malta. This negligible contribution to the economy is outweighed by its social and cultural importance, including local fishermen catching highly prized species by traditional artisanal methods and sold fresh to the consumer at local seafood restaurants. These, along with the colourful fishing vessels, are a tourist attraction, with the winter months seeing almost no vessels landing fish at minor ports.

A fishing zone of 25 nautical miles surrounding the Maltese archipelago was established in the 1970s, with the first 12 miles exclusively reserved for Maltese fishermen. The zone is also used by aquaculture operators for controlled cultivation. Marsaxlokk Harbour, located in southeastern Malta, is the island's primary fishing port. Approximately 40% of Malta's registered fishing vessels operate from the nearby villages of Marsaxlokk and Birżebbuġa, which are separated by a promontory featuring Fort San Lucian, now home to the Malta Centre for Fisheries Sciences.

Malta's Mediterranean location is strategically beneficial for tuna penning, in which smaller tuna are caught off shore and moved back to large, in-water enclosures. The pens are typically located in the relatively shallow waters of sheltered areas, such as bays or coves. Three bluefin tuna farms operate from a specifically assigned Aquaculture Zone 6 km (3.7 mi) off the south-eastern coast. Annual statistics show that the Maltese tuna industry reared 13,000 tones of tuna, valued at circa €170 million. Maltese aquaculture produce is almost entirely exported to European and Asian markets.

Other seasonal Mediterranean fish caught in Maltese waters are sea bass, dolphinfish, swordfish and John Dory. The fishing sector is forecast to show further growth in future years.

== Forestry ==
Malta has a very small percentage of forested land, with only about 1% of the island's total area covered by forests. This is significantly lower than the EU average. All forested land in Malta is publicly owned. Due to the limited forest cover, Malta does not have a major forestry industry. It relies on imports for wood and paper products. Historically, Malta's landscape was more forested, but it was largely cleared for shipbuilding and other purposes centuries ago.

== See also ==
- Economy of Malta
- Maltese cuisine
