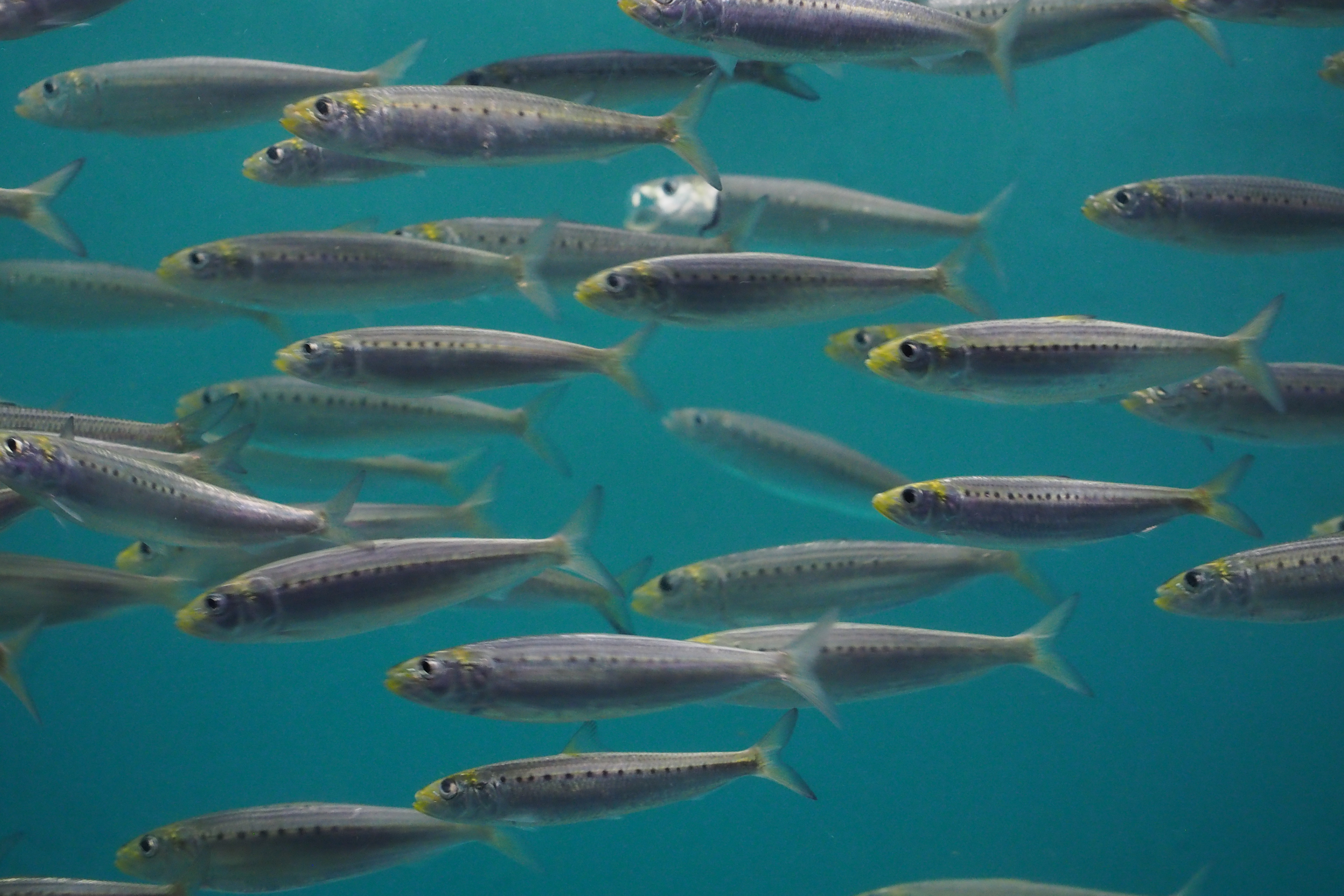

Conservation status
- Least Concern (IUCN 3.1)

Scientific classification
- Kingdom: Animalia
- Phylum: Chordata
- Class: Actinopterygii
- Division: Teleostei
- Order: Clupeiformes
- Family: Alosidae
- Genus: Sardinops; C. L. Hubbs, 1929
- Species: S. sagax

Binomial name
- Sardinops sagax (Jenyns, 1842)

Synonyms
- List: Clupea caerulea Mitchill, 1815; Sardina caerulea (Mitchill, 1815); Clupea sagax Jenyns, 1842; Arengus sagax (Jenyns, 1842); Sardinops sagax sagax (Jenyns, 1842); Clupea lata Richardson & Gray, 1843; Clupea melanosticta Temminck & Schlegel, 1846; Sardinops melanostictus (Temminck & Schlegel, 1846); Sardinops sagax melanosticta (Temminck & Schlegel, 1846); Sardinops melanosticta (Temminck & Schlegel, 1846); Sardinopus melanostictus (Temminck & Schlegel, 1846); Clupea ocellata Pappe, 1853; Sardinops ocellata (Pappe, 1853); Sardinops ocellatus (Pappe, 1853); Meletta caerulea Girard, 1854; Clupanodon caeruleus (Girard, 1854); Sardinops caerulea (Girard, 1854); Sardinops caeruleus (Girard, 1854); Sardinops sagax caeruleus (Girard, 1854); Alosa musica Girard, 1855; Sardinops sagax musica (Girard, 1855); Alausa californica Gill, 1862; Clupea advena Philippi, 1879; Clupea neopilchardus Steindachner, 1879; Sardina neopilchardus (Steindachner, 1879); Sardinops neopilchardus (Steindachner, 1879); Sardinops sagax neopilchardus (Steindachner, 1879)

= Sardinops =

Genus of fish

Sardinops is a genus of sardines of the family Alosidae. It is found in the Indo-Pacific, East Pacific, Southeastern Atlantic, and southwestern Indian oceans. Its length is up to 40 cm (16 in). It has numerous common or vernacular names, some of which more appropriately refer to subspecies, including blue pilchard, blue-bait, South American pilchard, Chilean sardine, and Pacific sardine.

Often considered monotypic with only member as Sardinops sagax, it currently has three valid extant species:

- Sardinops melanosticta (Temminck & Schlegel, 1846) (Japanese pilchard)
- Sardinops ocellatus (Pappe, 1853) (Southern African pilchard)
- Sardinops sagax (Jenyns, 1842)
  - Sardinops sagax caeruleus (Girard, 1854) (Californian pilchard)
  - Sardinops sagax musica (Girard, 1855)
  - Sardinops sagax neopilchardus (Steindachner, 1879) (Australian pilchard)
  - Sardinops sagax sagax (Jenyns, 1842) (Peruvian Pacific sardine)

An extinct species, S. humboldti, was described in 2025 from Miocene fossils found in southern Peru.

== South Australian sardine fishery ==
The South Australian sardine fishery targets Sardinops sagax and is the highest yielding single species fishery in Australia by volume. The fishery employs the technique of purse seining, which contributes to the sardines' status as sustainable. Schools of sardines are encircled by a net up to 1 kilometre in length which is then drawn closed at the bottom. The catch is then pumped on board the fishing vessel where it is stored in refrigerated holds at below freezing temperatures. 94% of the catch is used as feed in Southern bluefin tuna ranching operations off Port Lincoln, South Australia. The remaining 6% of the catch serves human consumption, recreational fishing bait and premium pet food markets.

The industry commenced in South Australia in 1991 with an annual catch quota of 1,000 metric tons (980 long tons; 1,100 short tons). In 2003, the fishery's annual quota was set at 36,000 metric tons (35,000 long tons; 40,000 short tons). By 2014, the annual quota had increased to 38,000 metric tons (37,000 long tons; 42,000 short tons). The fishery's total landed catch peaked at 56,952 metric tons (56,053 long tons; 62,779 short tons) in the financial year 2004-05 stabilising at around 32,000 metric tons (31,000 long tons; 35,000 short tons) per year thereafter.

A key area of concern for industry compliance in 2004 was quota evasion, which had previously occurred in several forms: unloading catch directly to tuna farms, failing to report prior to unloading catch, and dumping excess catch at sea.

Global capture production of Pacific sardine (Sardinops sagax) in million tonnes from 1950 to 2022, as reported by the FAO

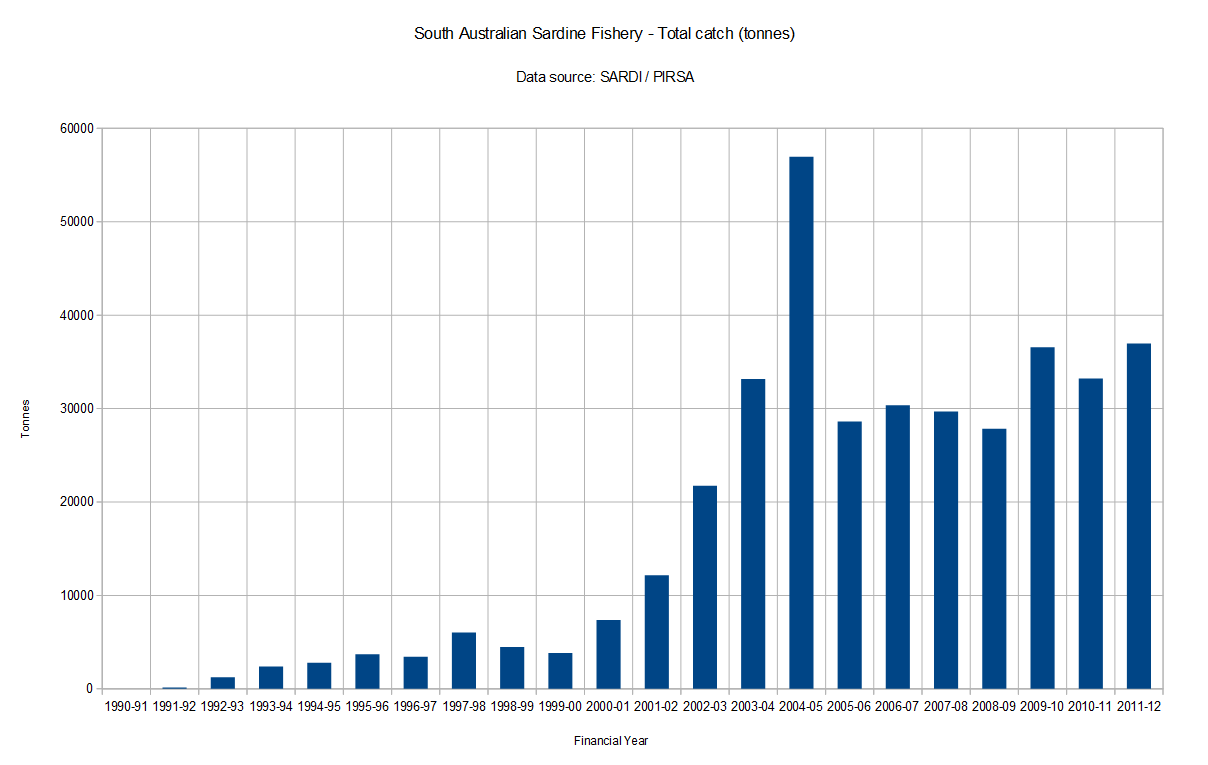
South Australian sardine fishery - Total catch (1990-2012)

== Gallery ==
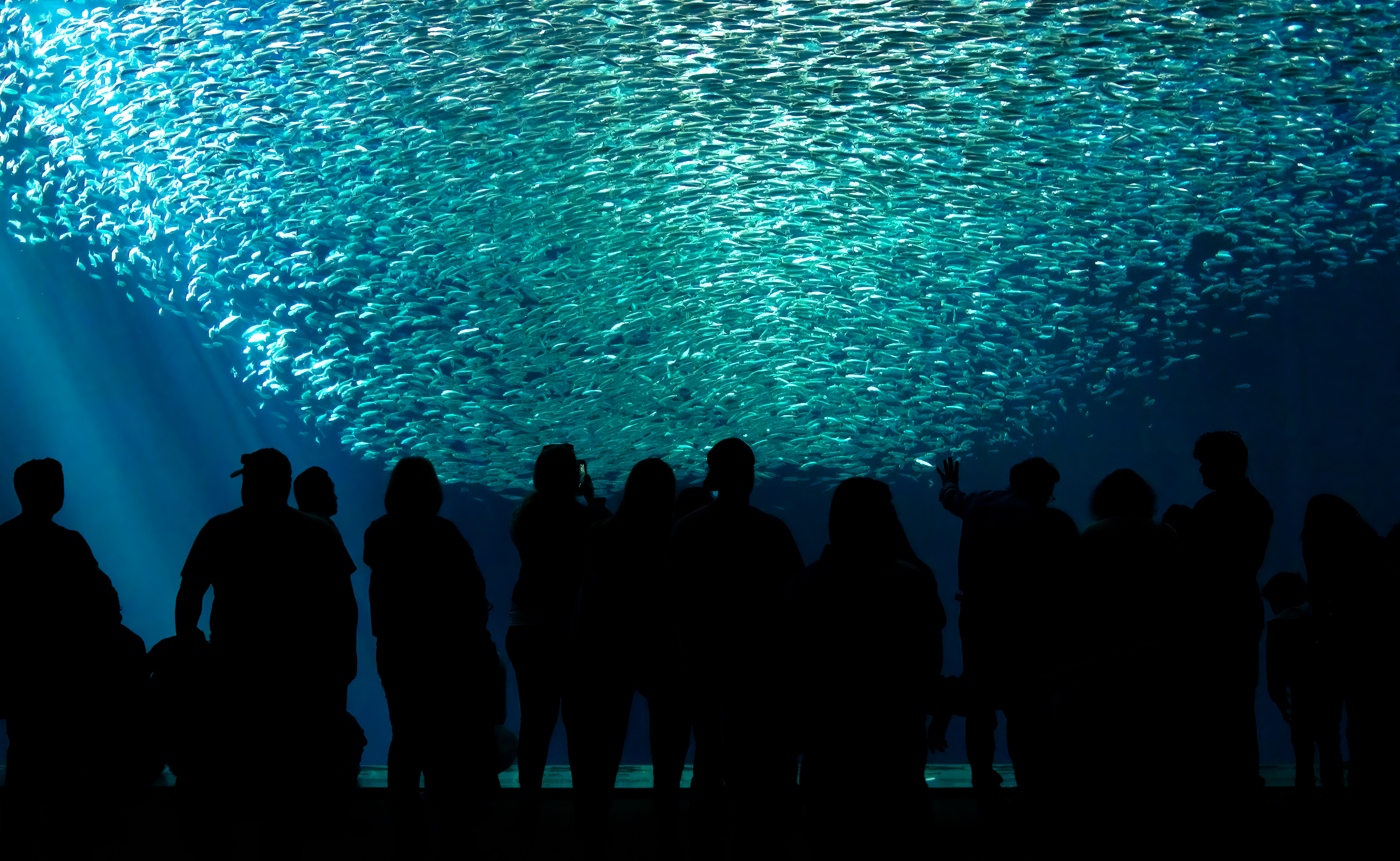
A school of S. sagax in the Open Sea exhibit at Monterey Bay Aquarium

Pacific sardines in the Sunshine Aquarium

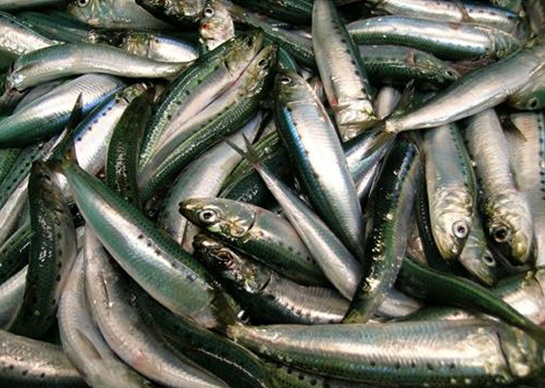
Catch of Pacific sardines

Pacific sardines are blue-green on the back and have white flanks with one to three lengthwise rows of dark spots.

== See also ==
- Sardine run
- Southern bluefin tuna
