= Maltese wine =

Wine making in Malta

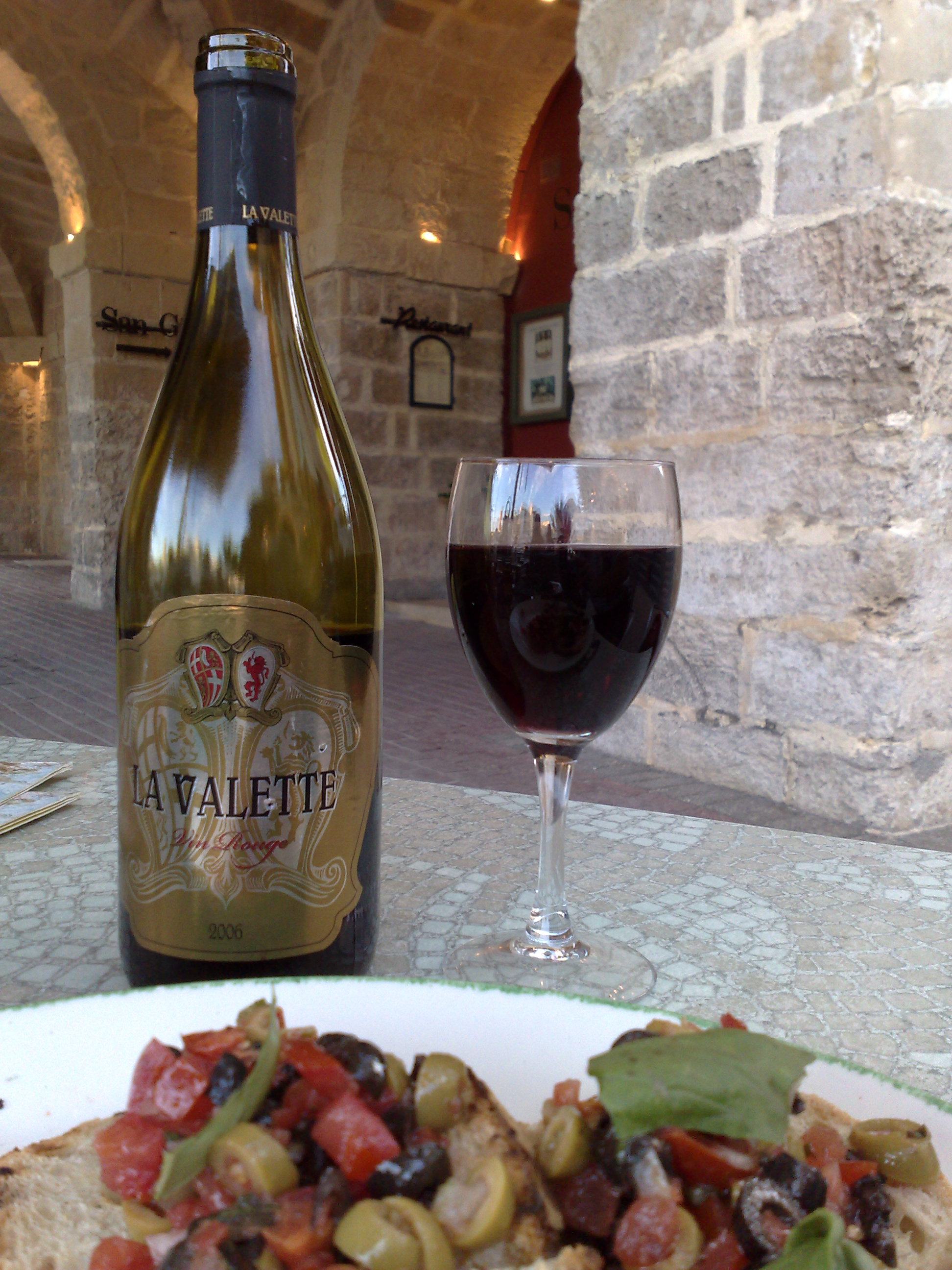
La Valette wine

Maltese wine dates back over two thousand years to the time of the Phoenicians. In the beginning of the 20th century Marsovin and Emmanuel Delicata wineries were established. In the 1970s wine production became more serious and international grape varieties began to be planted. After joining the European Union in 2004 protective levies were lifted. Locally produced wines with a "DOK" designation are protected designations of origin within the European Union.

Some of the wineries resort to using imported grapes because agricultural areas are severely limited on the islands by the growth of settlements and tourism. A wine festival is held in Valletta. In 2005, 630 tonnes of wine were produced on the islands.

== Wine styles ==
Today grape varieties grown on the Maltese islands include the two indigenous varieties named Ġellewża (red) and Girgentina (white), as well as several international varieties. Marsovin's Cassar de Malte is the traditional sparkling wine of Malta, which is made using the same method as champagne "methode traditionelle".

== Quality designations ==
In Malta, the designationas DOK and IĠT are used, which form part of the EU system of geographical indications.

Naming
EU Category (English)	EU Category (Maltese)	Designation in Malta	Product(s)
Protected Designation of Origin (PDO)	Denominazzjoni ta’ Oriġini Protetta (DOP)	Denominazzjoni ta’ Oriġini Kontrollata (DOK)	Malta; Gozo / Għawdex
Protected Geographical Indication (PGI)	Indikazzjoni Ġeografika Protetta (IĠP)	Indikazzjoni Ġeografika Tipika (IĠT)	Maltese Islands

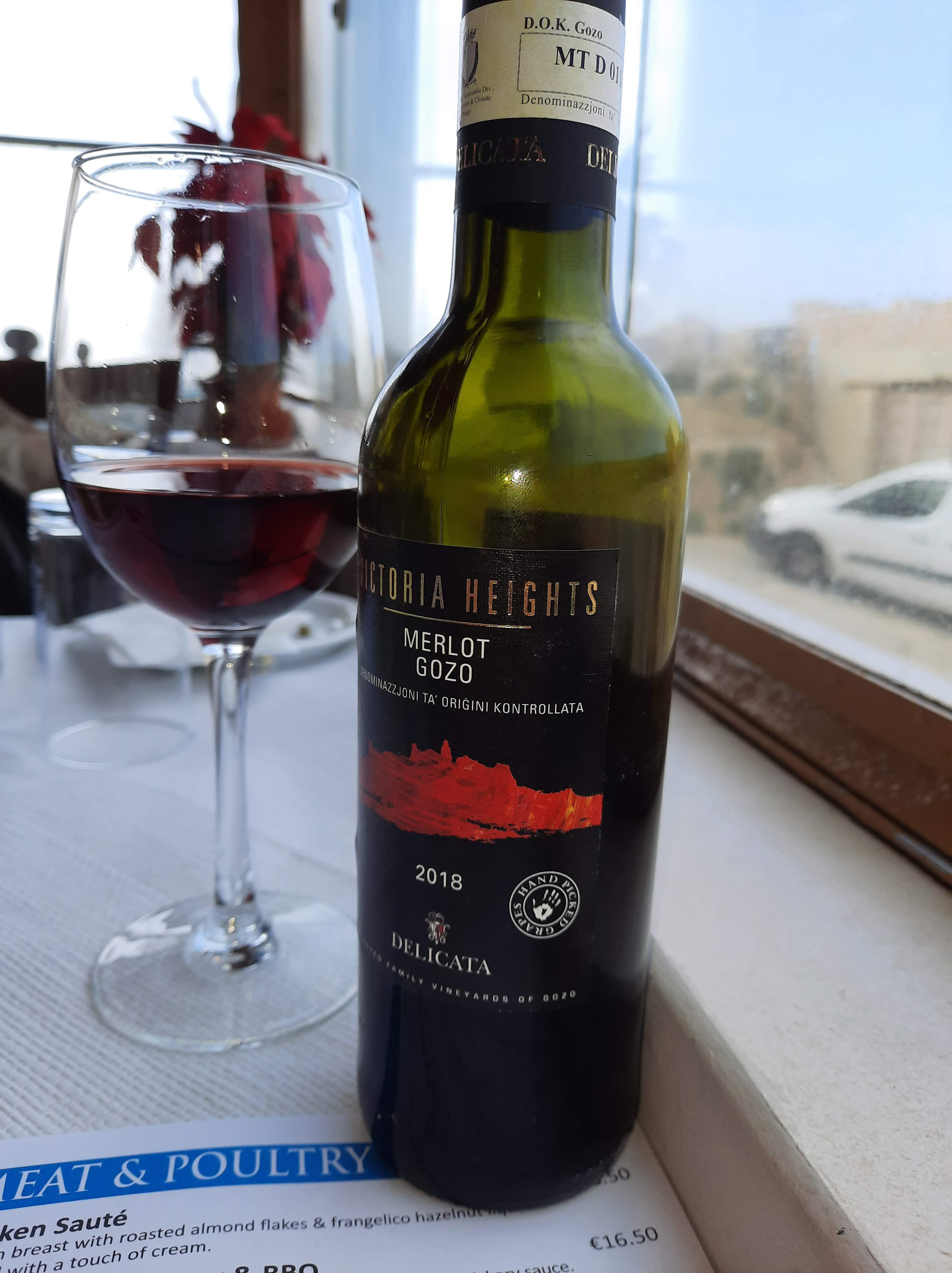
A Gozo DOK Merlot wine

Three wines have received a DOK or IĠT designation. As of 2021, they are the only geographical indications from Malta registered within the EU.

- Malta or "of Malta" is a DOK wine from the island of Malta, which is produced and packaged there. The maximum yield is 84-91 hectoliter/hectare.
- Gozo or "of Gozo" (Maltese: Għawdex or "Ta' Għawdex") is a DOK wine from the island of Gozo, with very similar requirement to those of "Malta".
- Maltese Islands or "of the Maltese Islands" is an IĠT wine from any of the islands for which higher yields are allowed than the DOK wines of 120-125 hectoliter/hectare.

== Wineries ==
There are five major wine producers on the island: Marsovin, Emmanuel Delicata, Camilleri Wines, Montekristo and Meridiana. Delicata and Marsovin were established in 1907 and 1919 respectively and both are based near Paola. Meridiana was established in 1987. The other two wineries were planted in the 2000s when Maltese viticulture experienced a growth in quality production.

In Gozo, Malta's sister island one finds two other wineries. These are Ta' Mena Winery which produces a range of IĠT and DOK wines and Tal-Massar Winery.

== Qormi Wine Festival ==
Qormi Wine Festival is an event organized in Qormi, Malta in the first week of September (since September 2005) by Kumitat Festi Esterni. This festival is organized in the streets of Qormi, in front of St. George's Parish Church. The two-day free event includes promotional events from all over the island. Five exhibitions, ranging from wine, paintings, photo, floral and another of historical and cultural treasures found in Qormi, are concurrently held during the Qormi Wine Festival.

== See also ==
- Winemaking
