= Peruvian Pacific sardine =

Conservation status
- Least Concern (IUCN 3.1)

Scientific classification
- Kingdom: Animalia
- Phylum: Chordata
- Class: Actinopterygii
- Division: Teleostei
- Order: Clupeiformes
- Family: Alosidae
- Genus: Sardinops
- Species: S. sagax
- Subspecies: S. s. sagax

Trinomial name
- Sardinops sagax sagax (Jenyns, 1842)

Subspecies of fish

The Peruvian Pacific sardine (scientific name Sardinops sagax sagax) is a subspecies of the South American pilchard found in Peru. Related subspecies and species of international importance include Sardinops sagax caeruleus (USA), Sardinops sagax melanosticta (Japan), and Sardina pilchardus (Spain). Its geographical distribution extends from the Gulf of Guayaquil (Ecuador) up to Talcahuano (Chile). The most important location of the fish in Peru is Paita, Parachique, Santa Rosa, and Chimbote.

In November 2006, Peru obtained the right to use the term sardine.
