= Emmanuel Delicata =

Emmanuel Delicata is a Maltese wine producer.

== History ==
Emmanuel Delicata, established in 1907, is Malta’s oldest family run winery producing the widest range of Malta grown wines with George Delicata leading the firm.

== Production ==
In the vineyard, Emmanuel Delicata developed and implemented the ‘Vines for Wines’ project in 1994, in a collaborative effort with the farming community to plant more vineyards with international grape varieties. ‘Vines for Wines’ still promotes sustainable practices which are environmentally sound, economically feasible and socially equitable.
