= Marsovin =

The Marsovin Ltd. is a Maltese wine producer. It was founded in 1919 and is situated in Paola.

After World War I Chev. Anthony Cassar founded a wine company with the name of A. & G. Cassar. Since 1956 the firm still owned by the Cassar family has been called Marsovin Ltd.. In the beginning, only imported grapes were pressed, but since the 1950s Marsovin has its own vineyards, where red and white grapes are grown, mostly French types.
