= Girgentina =

Variety of grape

Girgentina is a white-wine grape from Malta. Together with Ġellewża it is one of only two indigenous grape varieties on the islands. Probably brought to the islands from Sicily by the Phoenicians (the modern name comes from “Girgenti”, the ancient Agrigento) according to the Maltese viticulture feature article by the essayist Luca Farinotti, published in Times of Malta. Wine from Girgentina is exquisite and fresh. The alcohol content is only 10%.

== See also ==
- Maltese wine
