= Ġellewża =

Variety of grape

Ġellewża (Maltese pronunciation: [d͡ʒɛˈlːɛʊ̯zɐ]) is a dark-skinned grape variety that is native to the island of Malta. Only a small amount of wine is made from this little-planted variety. Volumes are far surpassed on the island by Girgentina, another native variety, along with the ever-present Chardonnay and Cabernet Sauvignon.

== Style ==
Ġellewża is used to make still red wines, as well as a semi-sparkling rosé wine. The strawberry-tinged sparkling rosés are often made in a medium dry style, with red fruit aromas to the fore. The red wines tend to be medium bodied, but Ġellewża is increasingly found in blends, together with Syrah or Cabernet Sauvignon to make a more full-bodied wine. Ġellewża often acts to soften the spiciness of the wine and add a bright cherry flavour.

== Usage ==
As most of Malta's wine output is consumed by locals and the thriving tourism trade, very little Ġellewża wine is found outside of the island. Furthermore, the survival of indigenous grape varieties is under threat due to climate change (longer periods of drought) and the high average age of growers.

== Availability ==
Although Ġellewża is produced in relatively small volumes, a number of Maltese wineries bottle varietal and blended wines featuring the grape. Popular examples include Marsovin’s 1919 Red, Delicata’s Medina Gellewża and Gellewża Frizzante Rosé, and other limited-release labels. These wines are mainly available within Malta and Gozo.

== See also ==
- Maltese wine
- Girgentina
