= Tuna penning =

Marine aquaculture practice

Tuna penning is a practice used in marine aquaculture, in which smaller tuna are caught off shore and moved back to large, in-water enclosures. The pens are typically located in the relatively shallow waters of sheltered areas, such as bays or coves. Tuna penning is primarily used for Atlantic Bluefin Tuna (ABT), a highly profitable stock for the global fish market. The tuna caught for penning are typically caught between May and July by purse-seine vessels, and then transported back to pens, where they are fattened until October–January before being frozen and shipped out. While in the pens, the tuna are fed primarily fresh fish, such as sardines, squid, and mackerel. In the past decade, tuna penning has become a large sector within the fish aquaculture industry, and takes place primarily in the Mediterranean. In 2010, ABT constituted 8% of global fish exports, the majority of which was shipped to Japan. Tuna penning is regulated by the International Commission for the Conservation of Atlantic Tunas (ICCAT), and each farm is required to register both the number of tuna it has and the total capacity of the farm.

== Geography ==
Large scale tuna penning production began in the 1980s off the coast of Canada. In the 1990s, the practice was moved over to Spain, and quickly spread through the Mediterranean. In the Mediterranean, the main producers are Italy, Malta, and Spain. Other tuna penning locations include Turkey, Croatia, Cyprus, Greece, Tunisia, and Libya. As of a 2010 census, there are over 60 tuna farms in the Mediterranean, with a total capacity of nearly 61,000 tons of tuna.

== Environmental impacts ==
Tuna penning is faced with a multitude of controversy regarding the impact it has on the local marine environment. The largest concern in the Mediterranean is the local eutrophication of a naturally oligotrophic environment. Because the Mediterranean Sea is a naturally oligotrophic environment, the majority of organisms living in the marine ecosystems of that area are not equipped to handle high levels of nutrients. The rapid influx of nutrients that occurs from fish farming has adverse effects on the surrounding ecosystems for this reason. A large contribution of this eutrophication is an excess in feed used for the cages. An estimated 25% of fish feed is actually consumed by Tuna, with the remaining 75% sinking to the sea floor to decompose. This feed is high in organic material and nutrients that then get released into the surrounding environments.

=== Water pollution ===
Tuna penning causes a number of changes in the physical water qualities of surrounding areas. Areas surrounding tuna farms typically see a decrease in dissolved oxygen. This is a direct result of increased aerobic respiration from the high density of tuna present and from the increased decomposition of excess fish feed. Dissolved oxygen is important for the metabolic processes of many living organisms. A decrease in dissolved oxygen makes for more adverse conditions for many of the naturally occurring species in the Mediterranean, and is correlated to a direct decrease in species richness in areas surrounding tuna farms. Tuna penning also increases the concentration of dissolved nutrients in the surround water. This can cause an increase in primary productivity, resulting in algal blooms. This may increase turbidity in the water, preventing the sea floor organisms from receiving sunlight. Some algal blooms can be damaging to local marine plant life, causing leaf fragility and death. Overall, eutrophication, increased turbidity, and decreased dissolved oxygen make it difficult for organisms designed to live in an oligotrophic environment to survive successfully. This caused a decline in local biodiversity and can cause a collapse in the ecosystem.

=== Sediment deposition ===
Tuna penning causes a large increase of biodeposition on the surrounding sea floor. This increase is largely due to the accumulation of excess fish feed that sinks down to the bottom. As a result, the sediment composition of the benthic communities surrounding tuna pens is shifted, with increased organic material and nutrient concentrations. The increased amount of organic material leads to increased aerobic respiration, causing a decrease in the oxygen content of the benthic sediment. Additionally, the average grain size of the sediment becomes significantly smaller, which can lead to the smothering of plant life. These shifts in the benthic community have been linked to decreased biodiversity in areas surrounding tuna pens.

== Future trends ==
There have been some suggestions of moving tuna pens farther offshore as a method of mitigating the sediment deposition and water pollution that occurs in shallower waters. Deeper water tends to have stronger ocean currents and water movement. By moving towards offshore aquaculture, excess nutrients and biodeposition could be swept away by the increased water flow. It would also allow for an increase in mixing of the water column, which could potentially mitigate the decrease in dissolved oxygen around the area.
